= North Terrace, Adelaide =

Street in Adelaide, South Australia

North Terrace South Australia
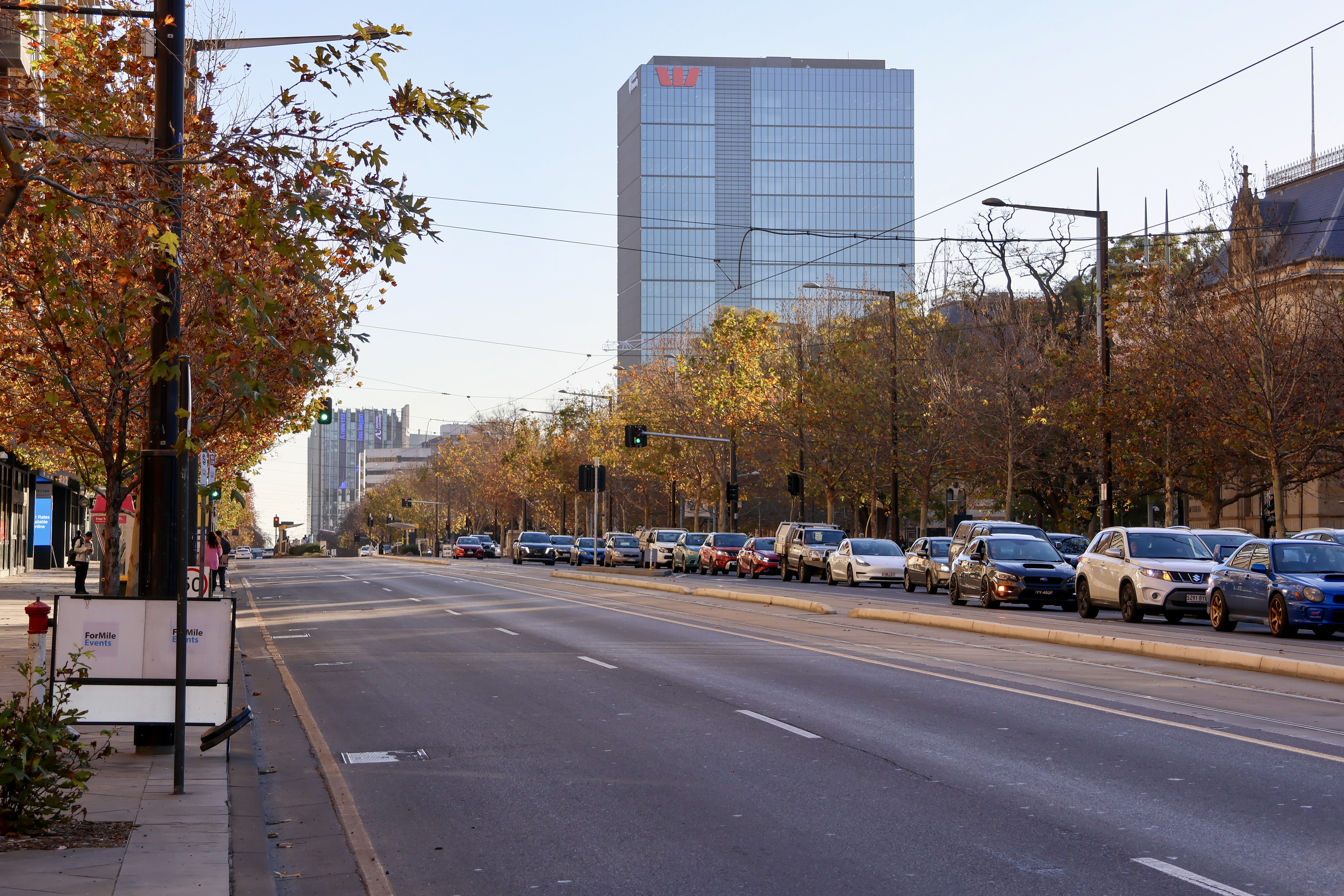
- North Terrace facing west
- Coordinates: 34.922091°S 138.587265°E (West end); 34.920964°S 138.610765°E (East end)

General information
- Type: Street
- Location: Adelaide city centre
- Length: 2.1 km (1.3 mi)
- Opened: 1837

Major junctions
- West end: West Terrace; Port Road; Adelaide
- Morphett Street; King William Street; Frome Street; Pulteney Street
- East end: East Terrace; Botanic Road; Adelaide

Location(s)
- LGA(s): City of Adelaide

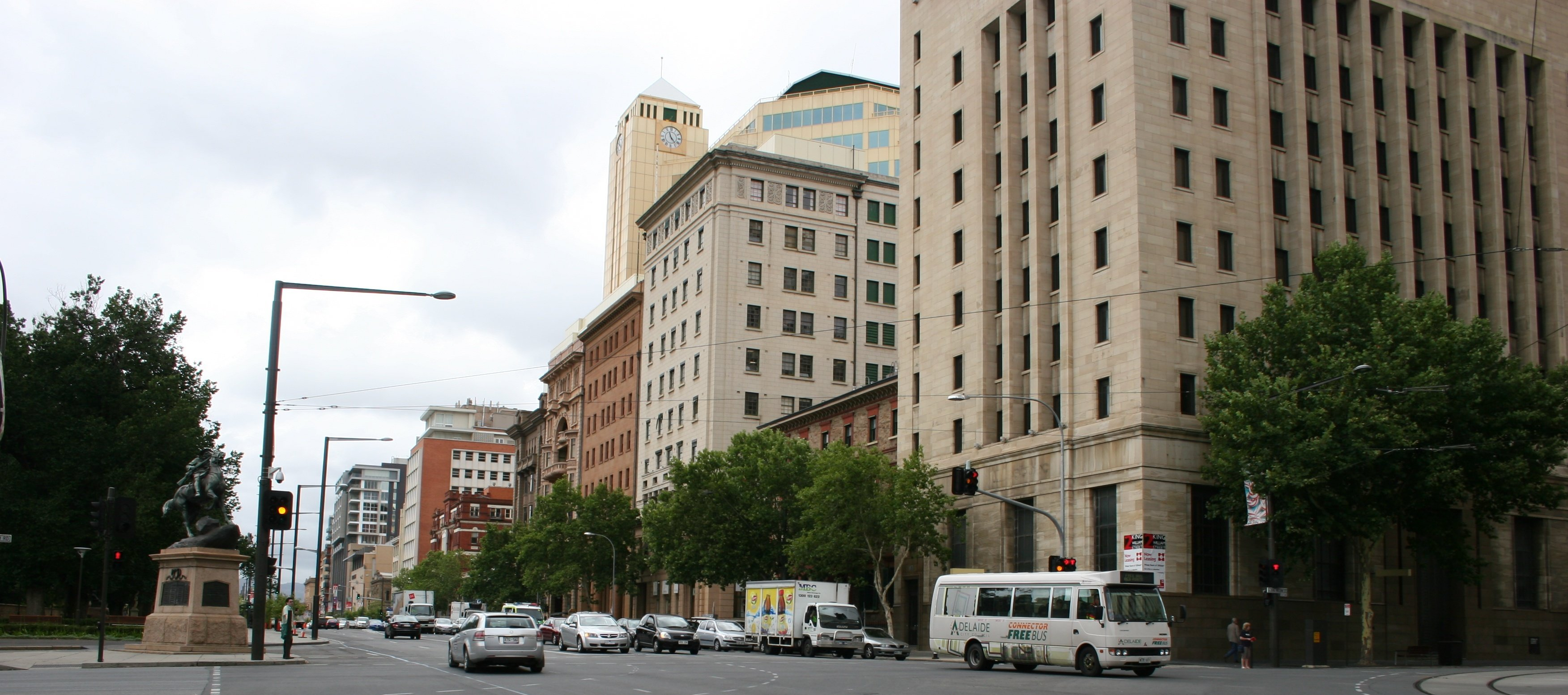
North Terrace looking east, from the King William Street intersection

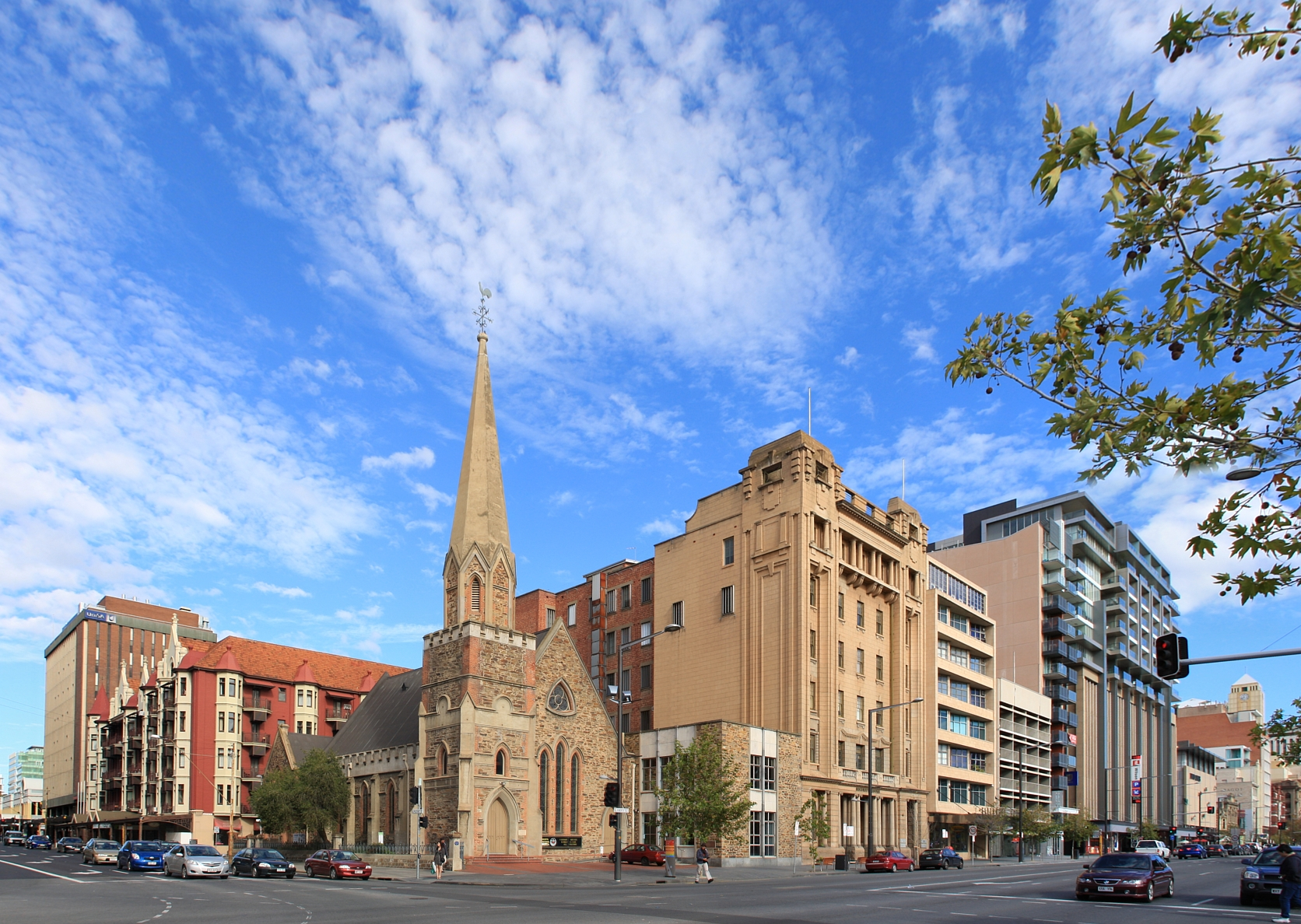
North Terrace intersection with Pulteney Street, looking south-west from Bonython Hall.

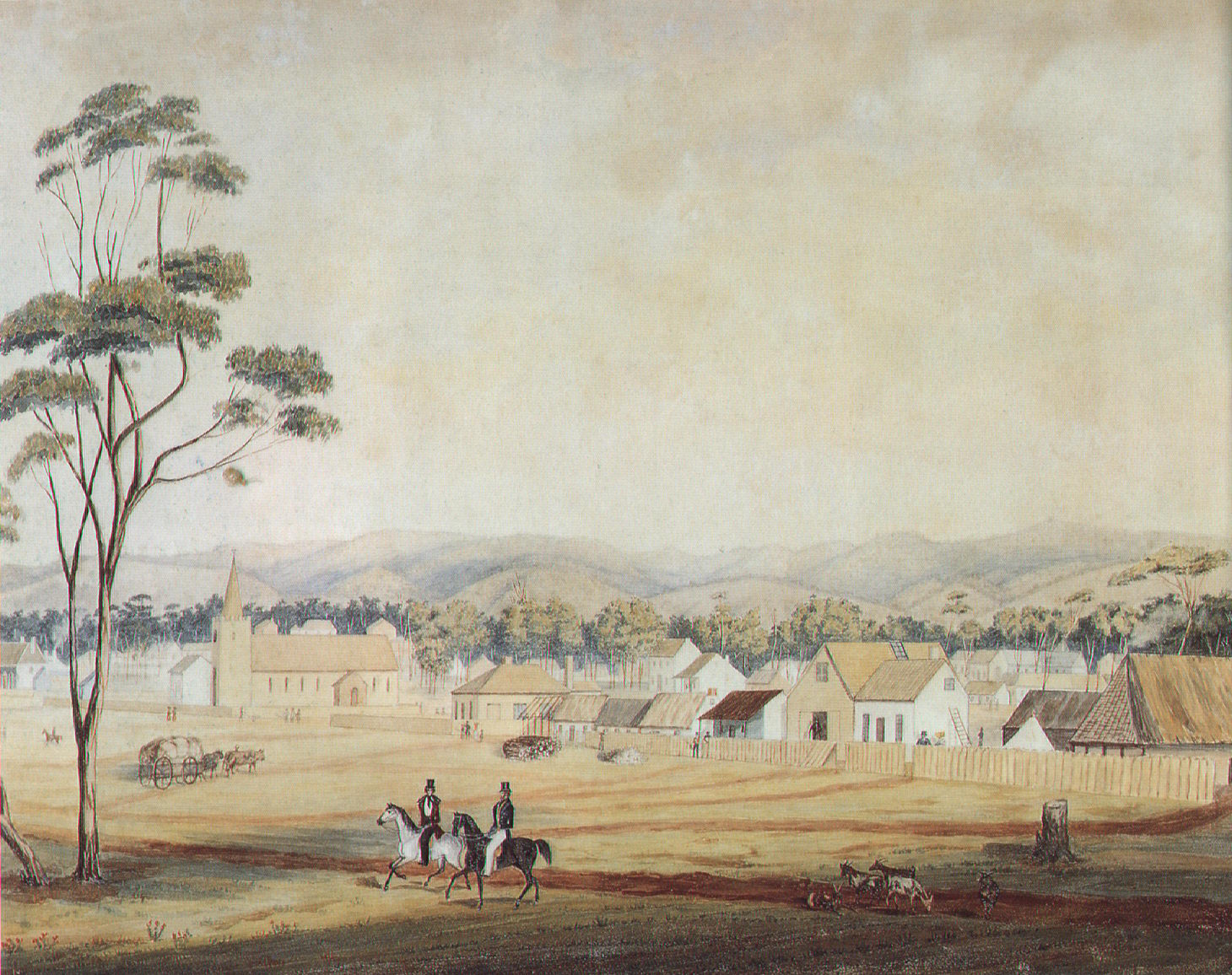
Adelaide in 1839 as viewed south-east from the western end of North Terrace, including Holy Trinity Church. (The church tower lost its "peaked cap" in 1844.)

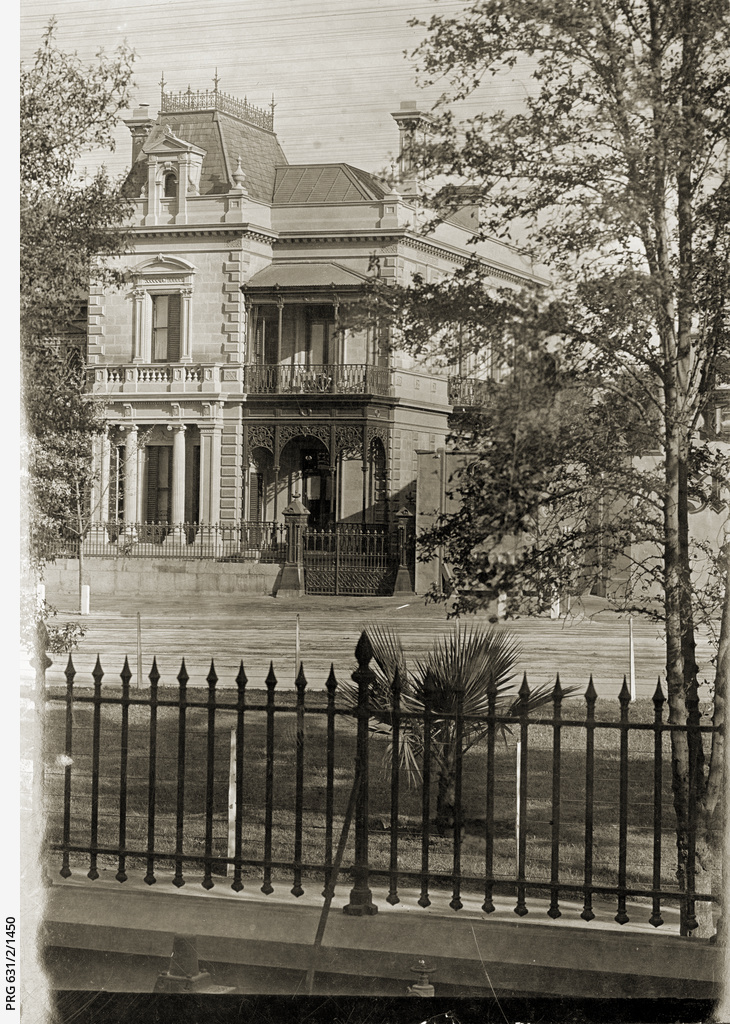
Italianate residence of Adelaide businessman and politician John Bagot on North Terrace, circa 1907

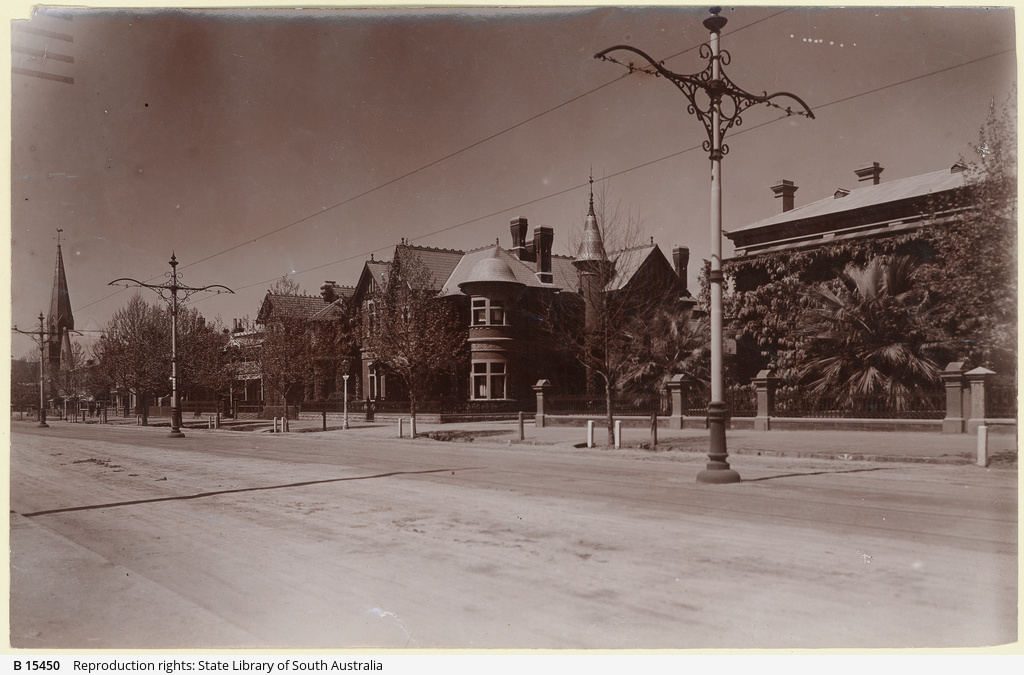
Residential houses and mansions with established front gardens line North Terrace, circa 1910

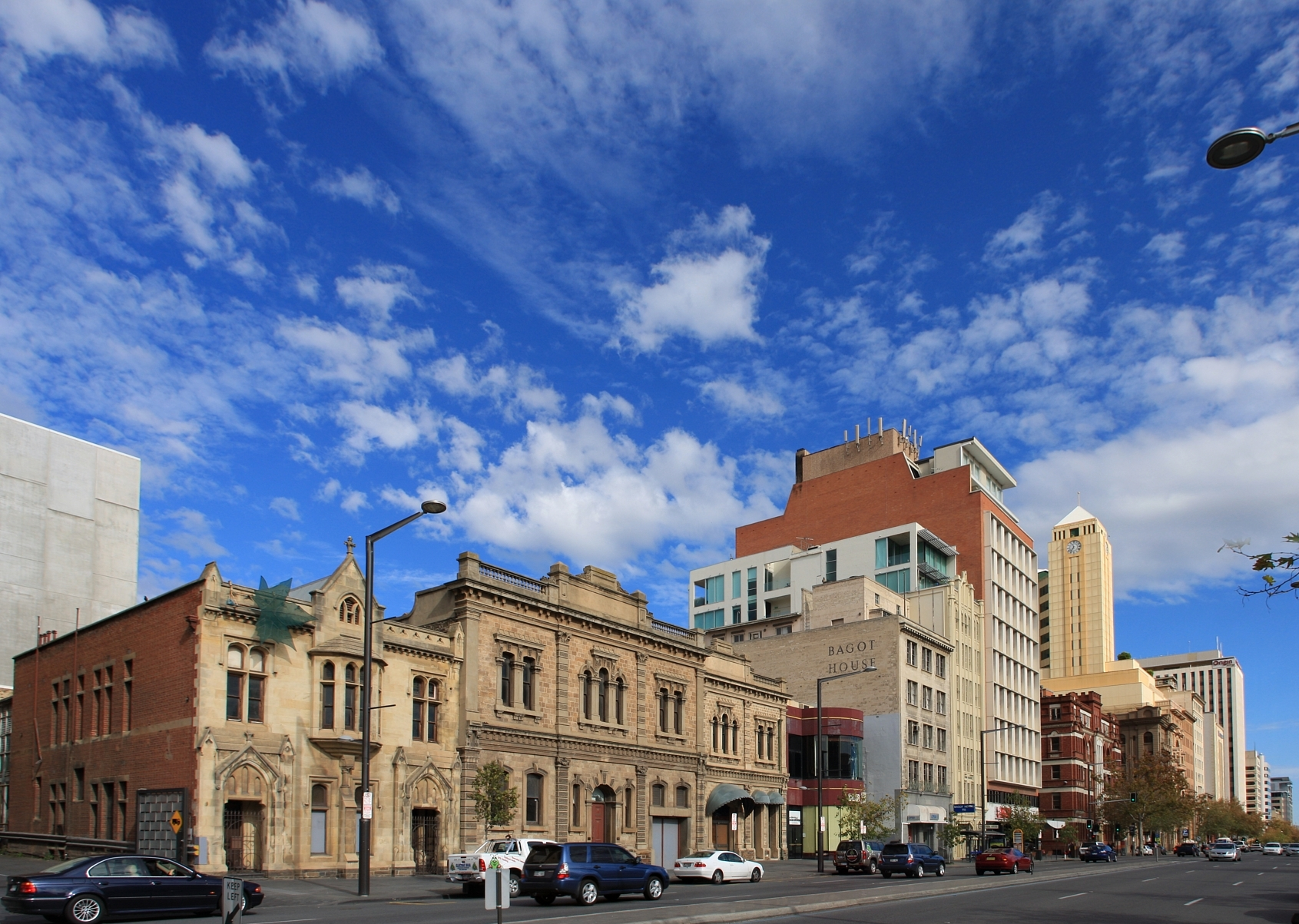
North Terrace, looking south-west from the South Australian Museum.

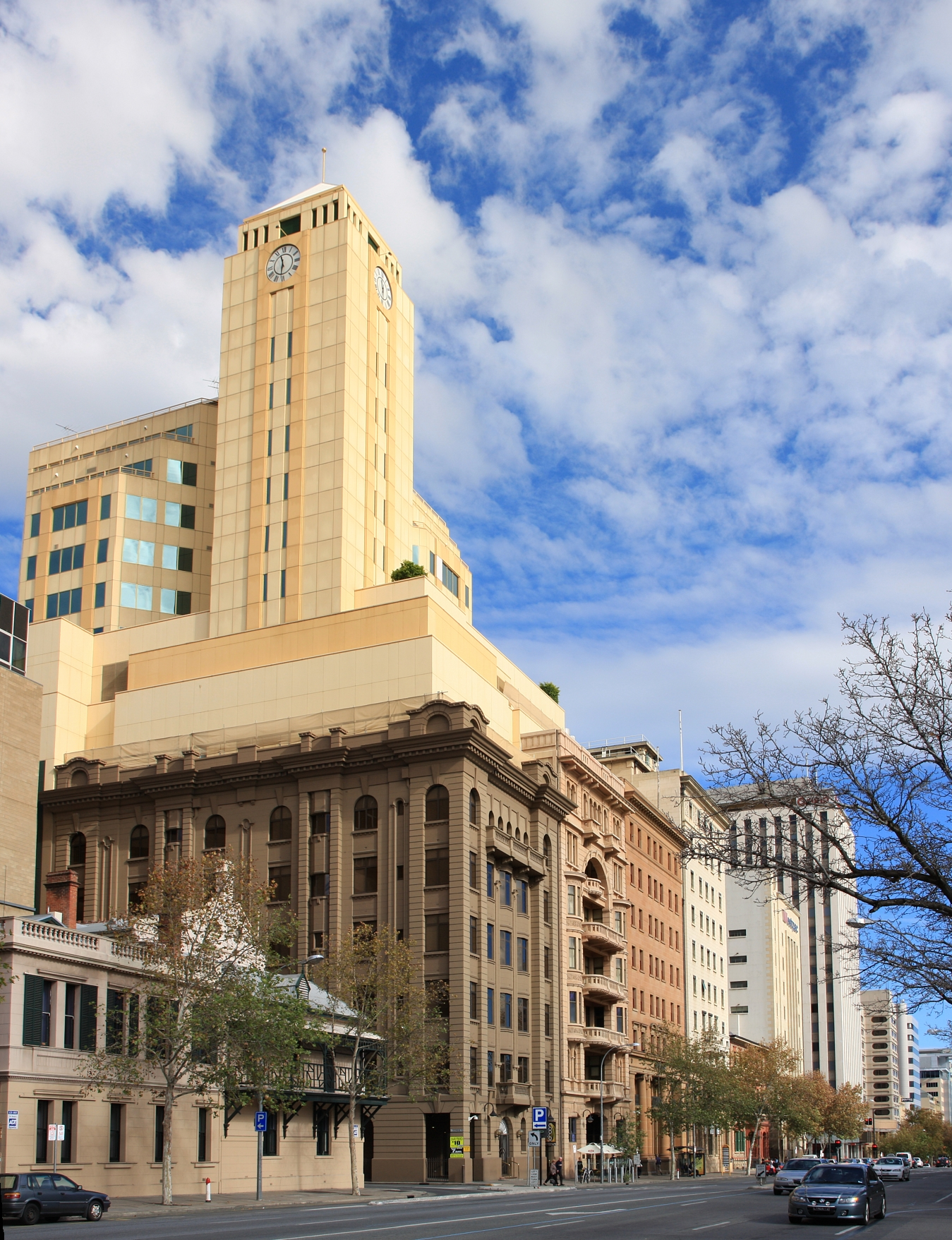
North Terrace, looking south-west from Kintore Avenue.

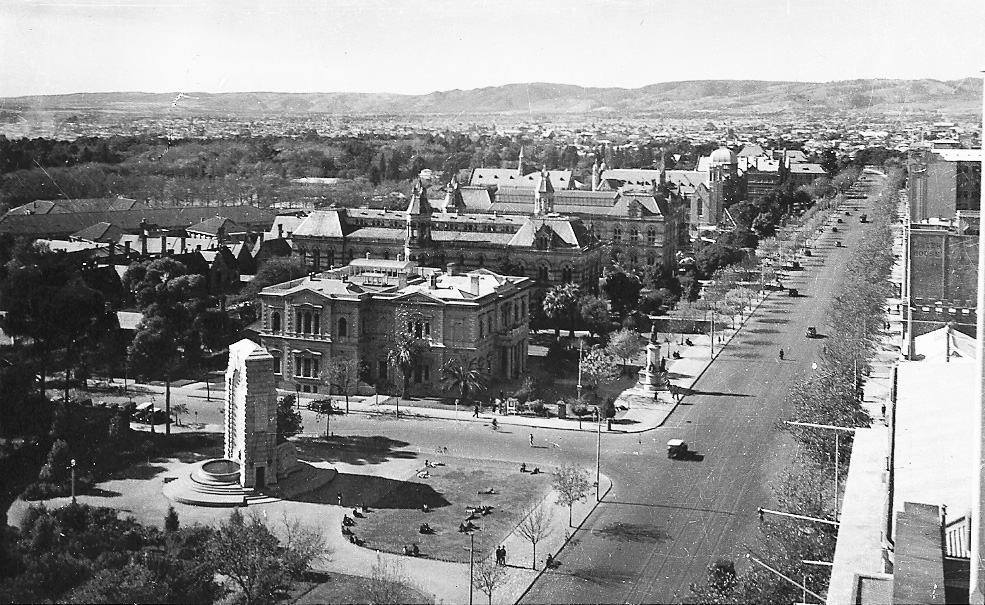
North Terrace, looking north-east from near King William Street, ca. 1940. (Kintore Avenue in the foreground)

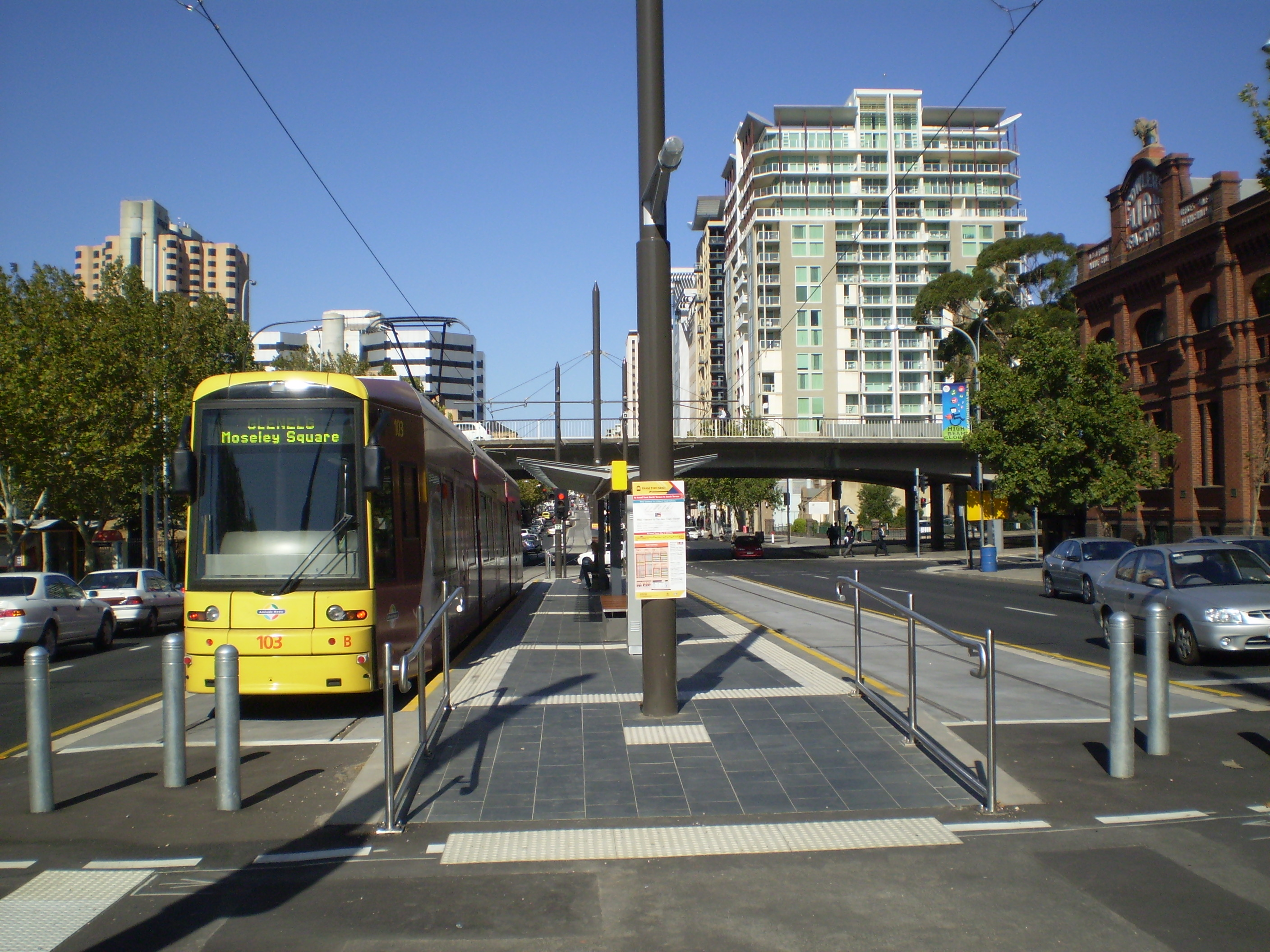
North Terrace, looking east from the tram stop adjacent to the City West campus of the University of South Australia.

North Terrace is one of the four terraces that bound the central business and residential district of Adelaide, the capital city of South Australia. It runs east–west along the northern edge of "the square mile". The western end continues on to Port Road and the eastern end continues across the Adelaide Park Lands as Botanic Road.

== North side of North Terrace ==
Theoretically, the northern side of North Terrace is part of the Adelaide Park Lands. However, much of the space between North Terrace and the River Torrens is occupied by cultural institutions and other public buildings. Starting from West Terrace and travelling east, these buildings include:

(West Terrace)

- Parkland
- Royal Adelaide Hospital
- South Australian Health and Medical Research Institute (SAHMRI)
- Adelaide Medical and Nursing Schools (University of Adelaide)
- University of South Australia Cancer Research Institute (previously the site of City Sk8 Park, a skateboarding facility)

(Morphett Street bridge)

- Adelaide Convention Centre, Exhibition Halls (partly above the railway station platforms)
- Riverside Centre (above the railway station platforms)
- InterContinental Hotel (formerly the Hyatt Regency until 2009). Public art around the hotel includes:
  - Yerrakartarta, on the forecourt, designed by Darryl Pfitzner Milika, which includes a representation of the Tjilbruke Dreaming story
  - Knocking from the inside (1998), on the northern plaza, created by Iranian-Australian artist Hossein Valamanesh AM
- Adelaide railway station building
- Adelaide Casino (inside the historic station building)
- Old Parliament House - the original South Australian Parliament building
- Parliament House
  - The Adelaide Festival Centre and Elder Park are behind Parliament House, between North Terrace and the River Torrens – also accessible from King William Road

(King William Road)

- Government House, the official residence of the governor of South Australia
  - The historic Torrens Parade Ground is behind Government House, between North Terrace and the River Torrens – accessible from King William Road
  - The South African War Memorial stands in front of Government House on a traffic island at the corner of North Terrace and King William Road
  - The Jubilee 150 Walkway commences in front of Government House
- National War Memorial

(Kintore Avenue)

- State Library of South Australia
  - Institute Building (1859)
  - Spence Wing
  - Mortlock Wing (1884)
- South Australian Museum
- Art Gallery of South Australia
- University of Adelaide (original campus, now called the North Terrace campus):
  - Mitchell Building
  - Elder Conservatorium of Music
  - Bonython Hall
  - Napier Building
  - Ligertwood Building
  - The Jubilee 150 Walkway finishes in front of the Napier/Ligertwood plaza.
- University of South Australia (originally the South Australian School of Mines and Industries/Adelaide Technical High School, now called the City East campus)

(Frome Road)

- Lot Fourteen
- Adelaide Botanic Garden

(East Terrace)

- Adelaide Botanic Garden
- National Wine Centre of Australia

== South side of North Terrace ==
Starting at West Terrace and travelling east, the southern side of the street includes:

(West Terrace)

- The Newmarket Hotel
- Assorted accommodation, businesses and medical practices
- Many buildings forming the City West campus of the University of South Australia
- The Lion Arts Centre (in the old Fowler's Lion Flour Factory building)

(Morphett Street bridge)

- The historic Holy Trinity Church (Anglican)
- Assorted accommodation, including the Stamford Plaza and Grosvenor Hotels, and Oaks Adelaide Embassy suites
- Various businesses and government offices
- The Dame Roma Mitchell building
- Assorted accommodation and various Adelaide head offices (e.g. MyBudget, Origin Energy)

(King William Street)

- The former Adelaide head office of Westpac
- The exclusive, historic and discreetly labelled Adelaide Club (for gentlemen)
- The Myer Centre, part of the Rundle Mall shopping precinct; the North Terrace entrance also maintains its former title, Goldbrough House. A heritage-listed building, it was designed by prominent SA architect F. Kenneth Milne and built in 1935, with an extra storey added in 1936.
- The Queen Adelaide Club (for women)
- "Gawler Chambers", the former Adelaide offices of the South Australian Company

(Gawler Place)

- Tobin House, formerly Lister House, at no. 126, designed and built 1928-9 by F. Kenneth Milne (then in practice with John Richard Schomburgk Evans and Charles Alexander Russell); renamed Tobin House 2002, later used as University of South Australia student accommodation
- David Jones, part of the Rundle Mall shopping precinct
- Assorted businesses, medical practices and University of Adelaide buildings
- The historic Scots Church (originally Free Church of Scotland, then Presbyterian, now Uniting Church)

(Pulteney Street)

- Various buildings occupied by the University of Adelaide
- The historic and architecturally elaborate Freemasons Hall, designed by John Quintin Bruce, a prominent Adelaide architect, who also designed Electra House in King William Street and Carclew on Montefiore Hill
- The Waterhouse house
- Assorted businesses
- The First Church of Christ, Scientist ("Christian Scientist" Church)

(Frome Street)

- Assorted businesses
- The historic Ayers House
- 19th century Terrace houses
- The historic Botanic Hotel

(East Terrace)

- Parkland

== Glenelg tram extensions ==
In October 2007, the extension of the Glenelg tram line from Victoria Square to the University of South Australia City West campus was completed. In 2010, a further extension along the remainder of North Terrace to continue along Port Road to the Adelaide Entertainment Centre was opened. Construction of a new junction, branch lines along the eastern end of North Terrace and King William Road and four new stops began in July/August 2017 and opened on 13 October 2018.

== Picture gallery ==
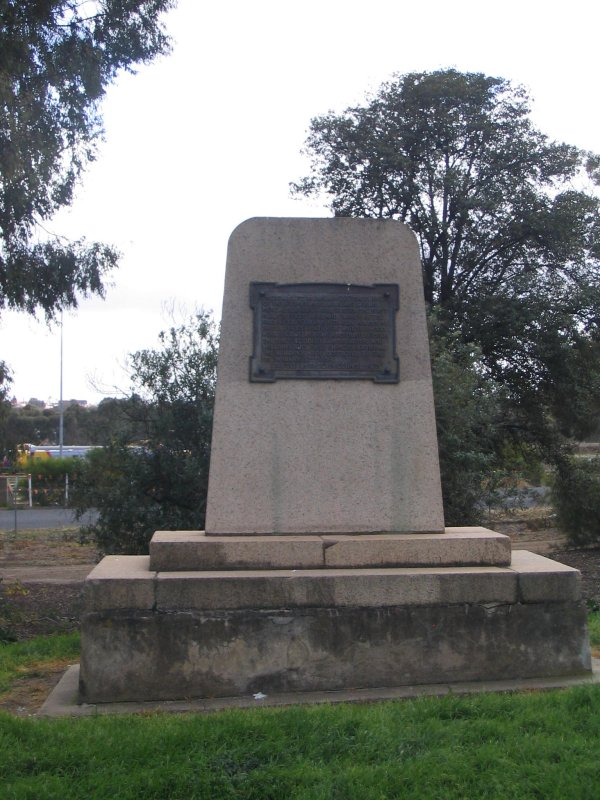
Monument on the corner of West Terrace (northern side)

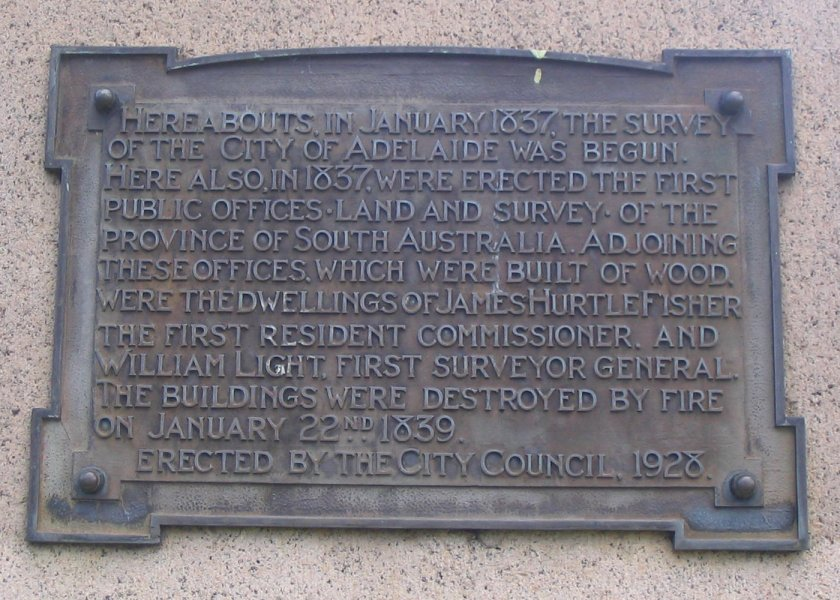
Plaque on monument on the corner of West Terrace

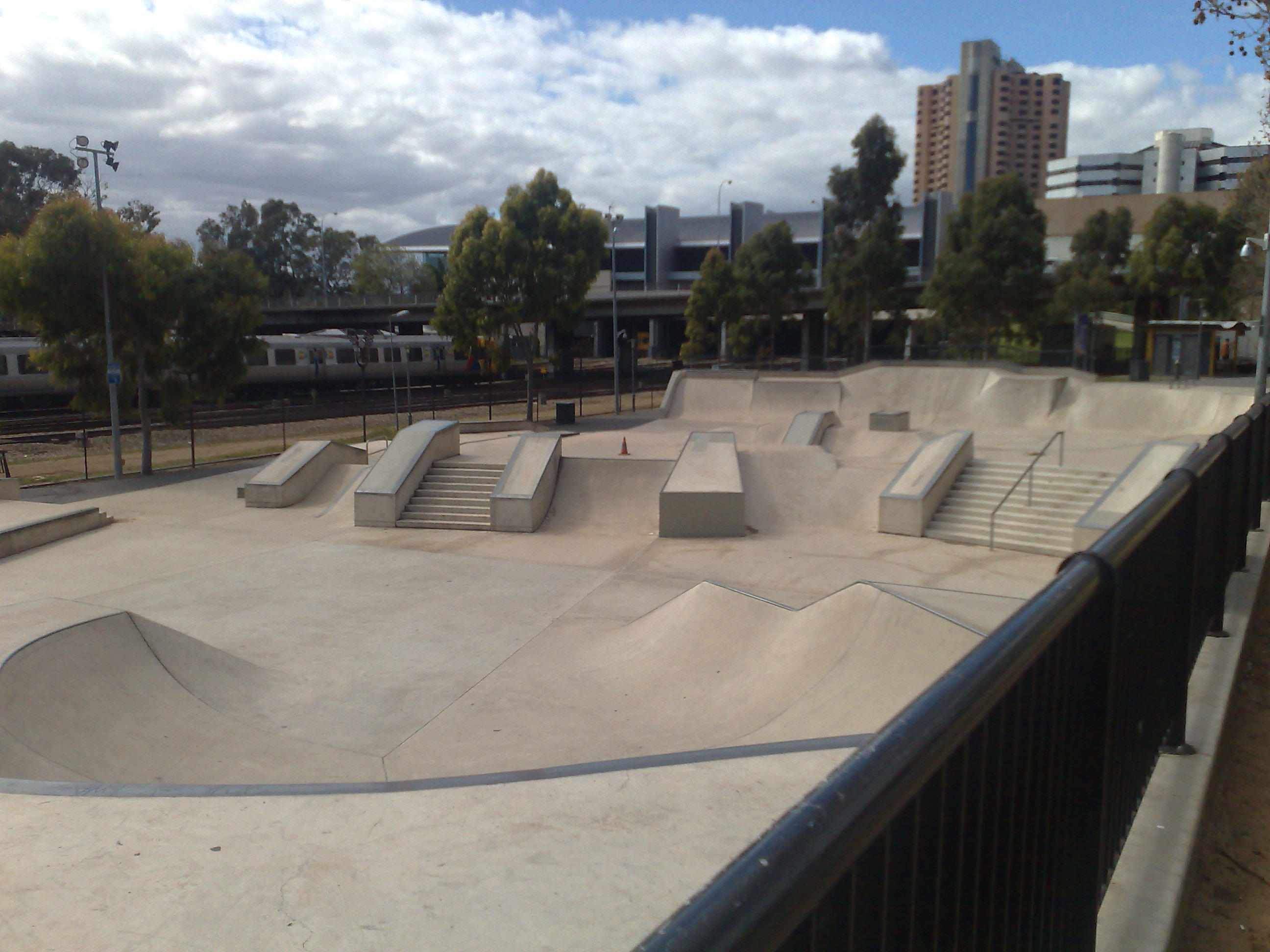
City Sk8 Park, Adelaide

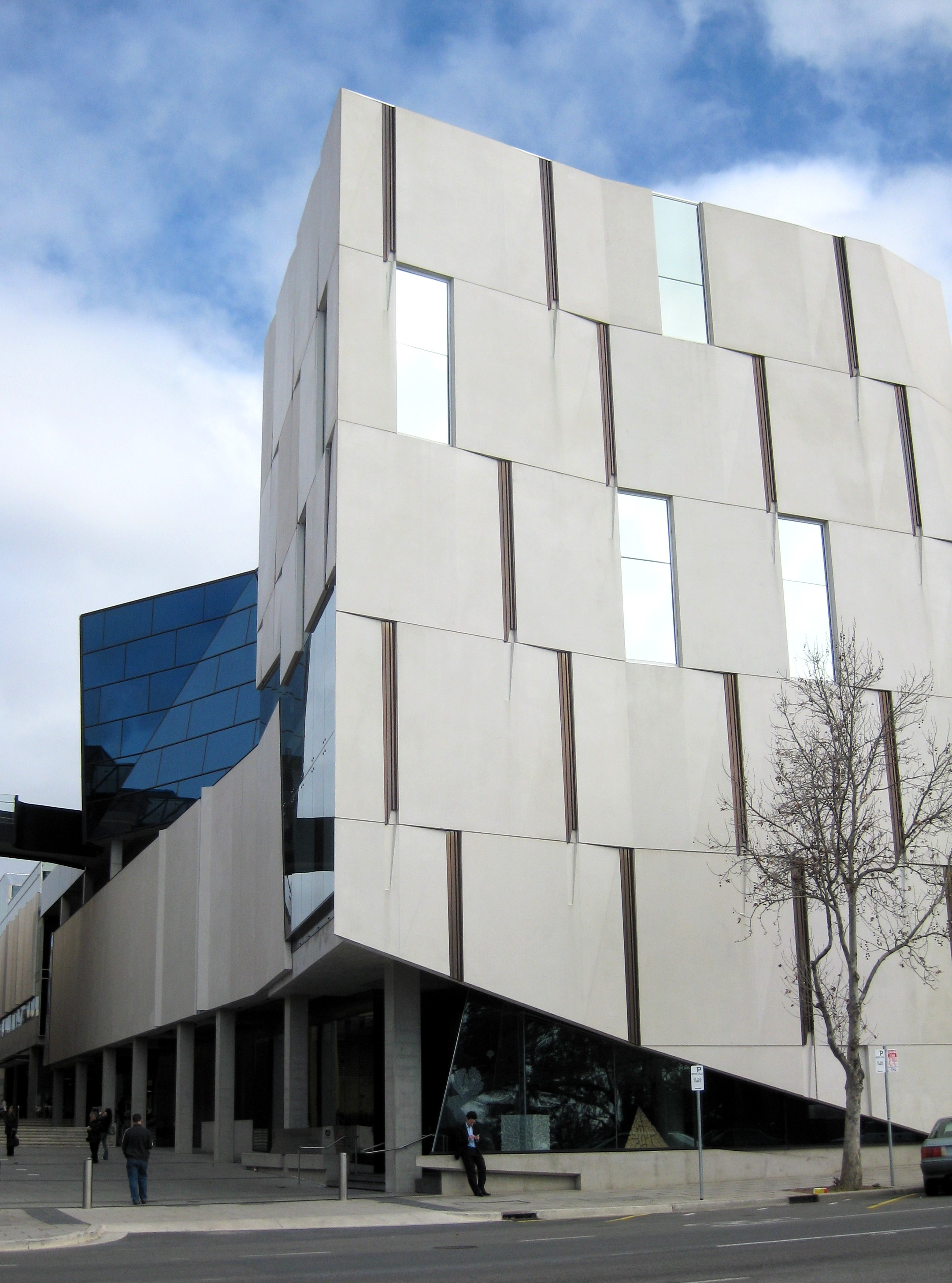
The Hawke Building, part of the University of South Australia, City West Campus

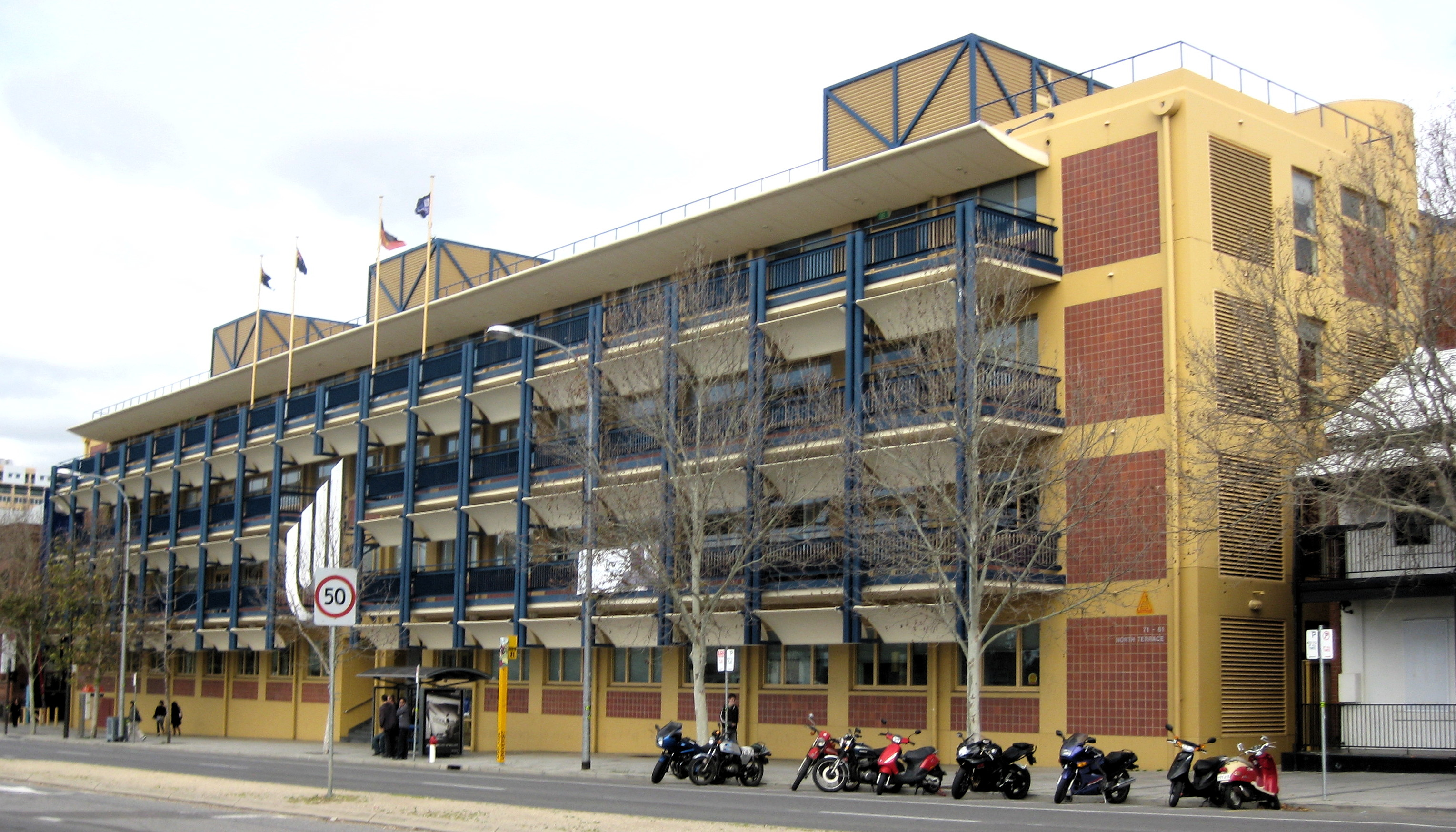
The Yungondi Building, part of the University of South Australia, City West Campus

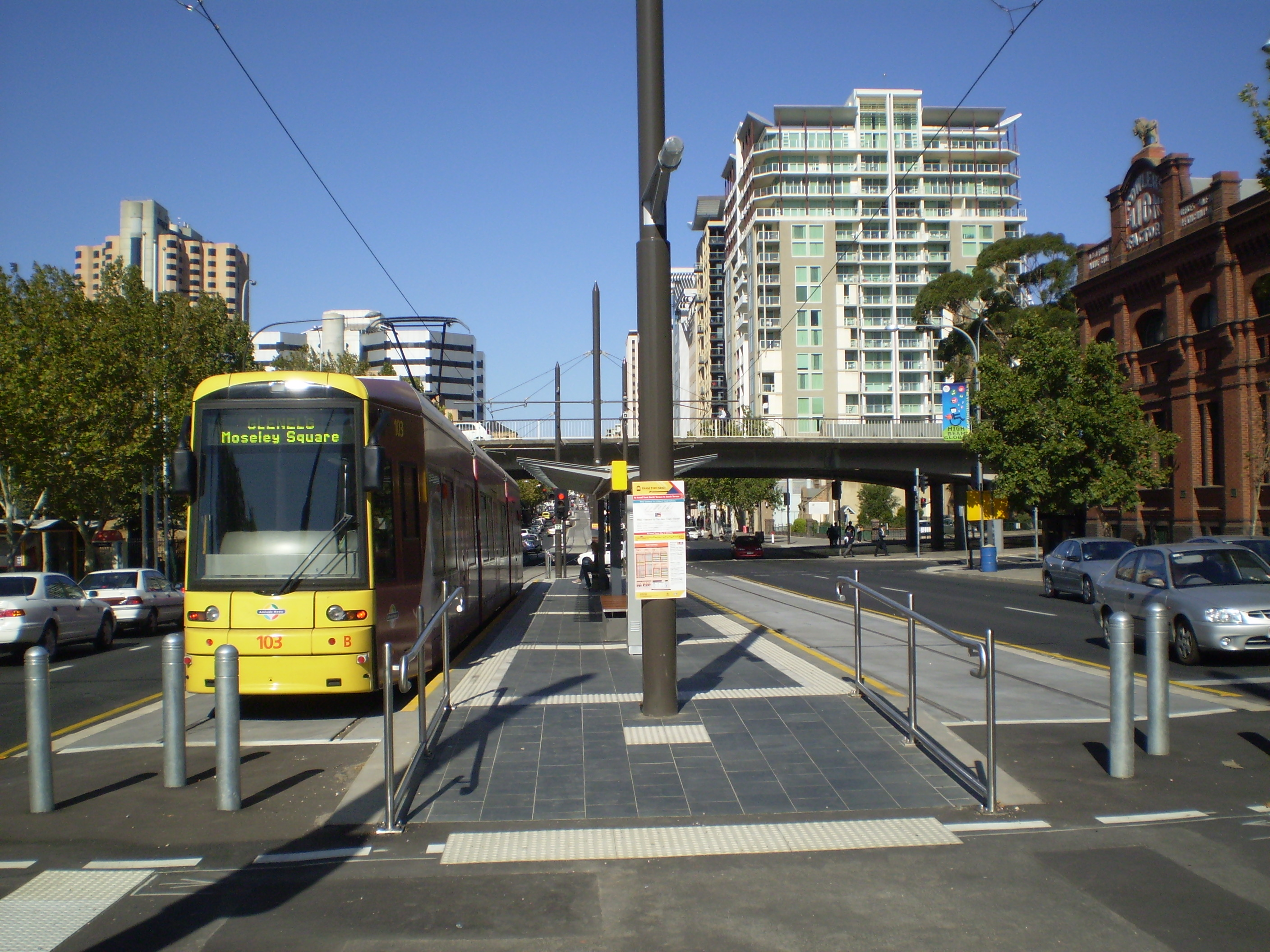
The City West tram stop - left-to-right: InterContinental Hotel, Riverside Building, Morphett Street bridge, multi-storey accommodation, the old Lion Flour factory

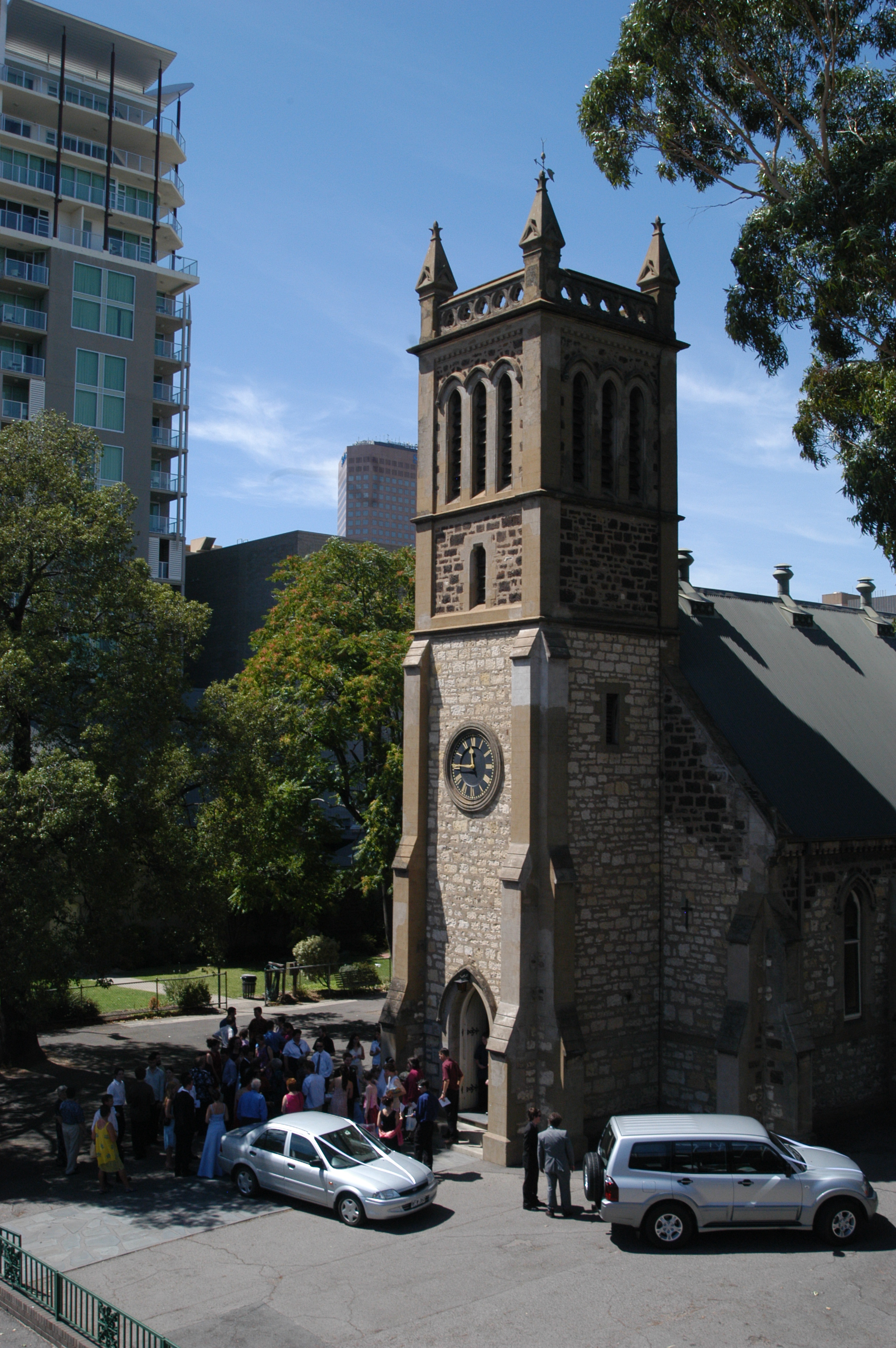
Holy Trinity Church, Adelaide

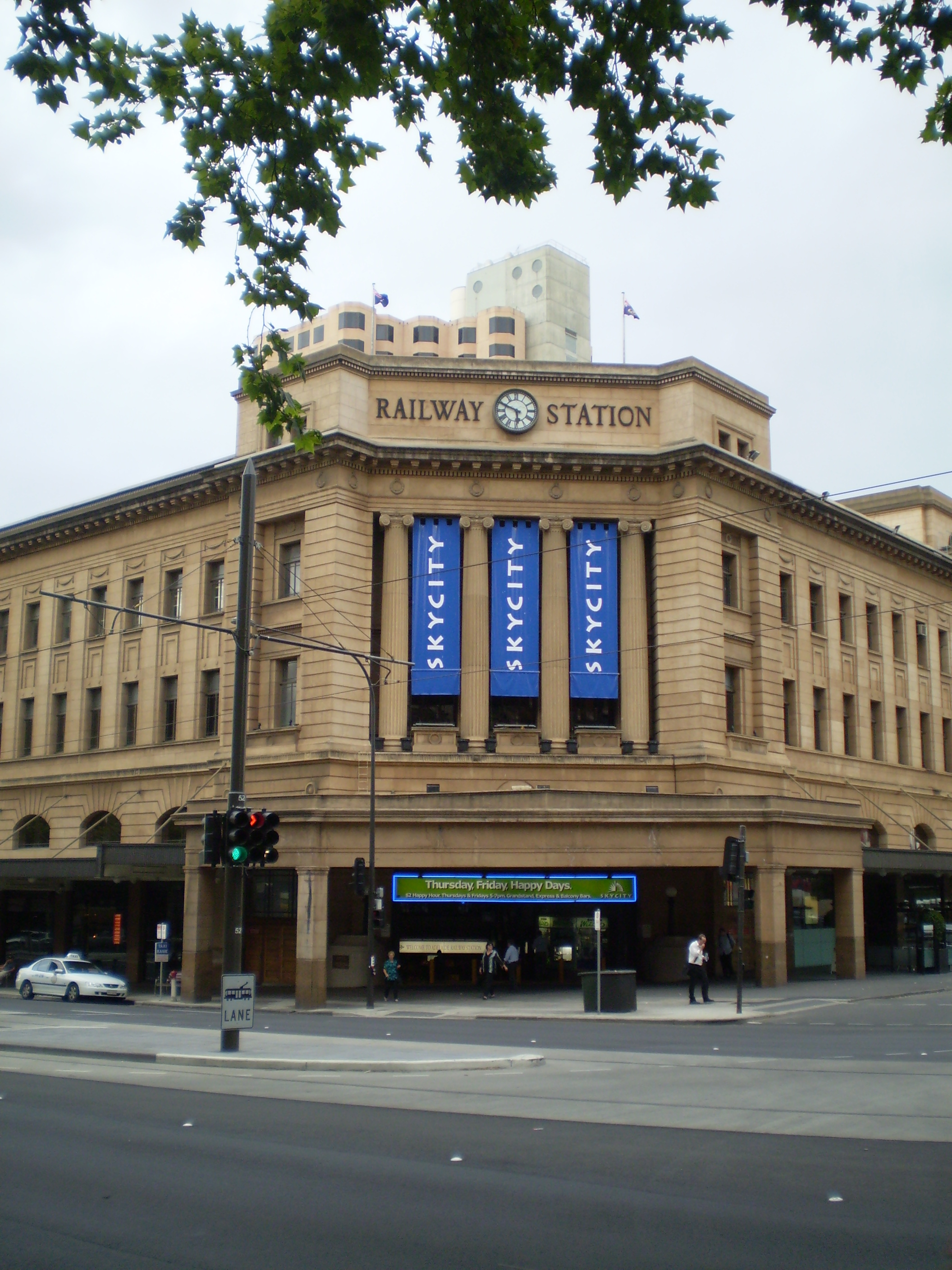
Part of the Adelaide railway station building - main entrance

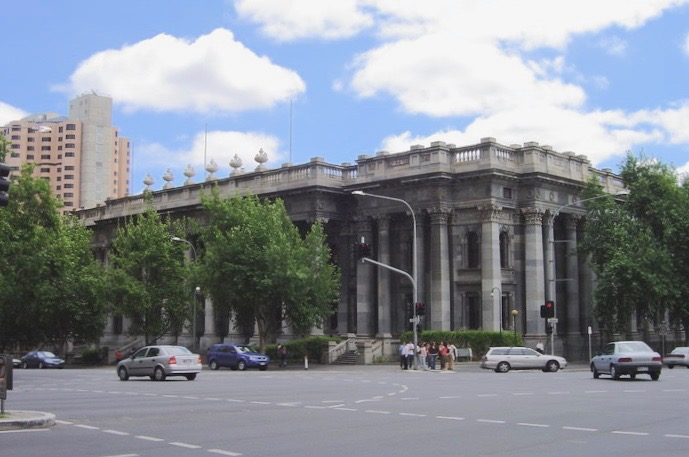
Parliament House with InterContinental Hotel

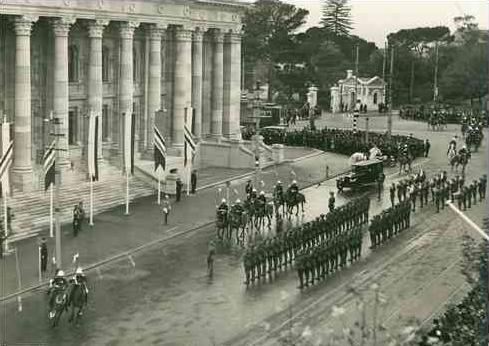
Opening of Parliament House, Adelaide, by the Governor-General, 5 June 1939.

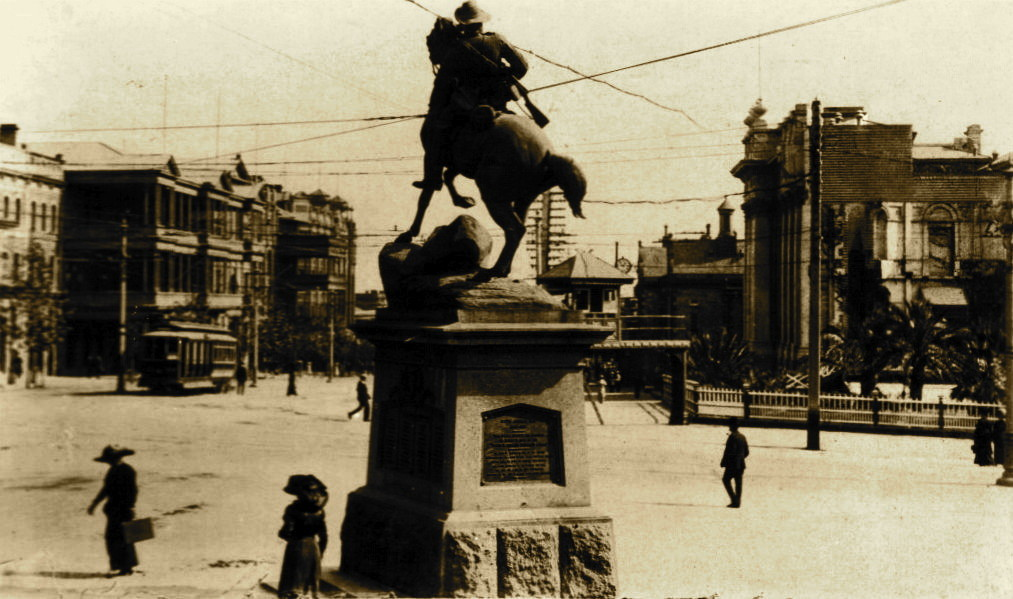
View of the South African War Memorial, looking West along North Terrace, circa 1925

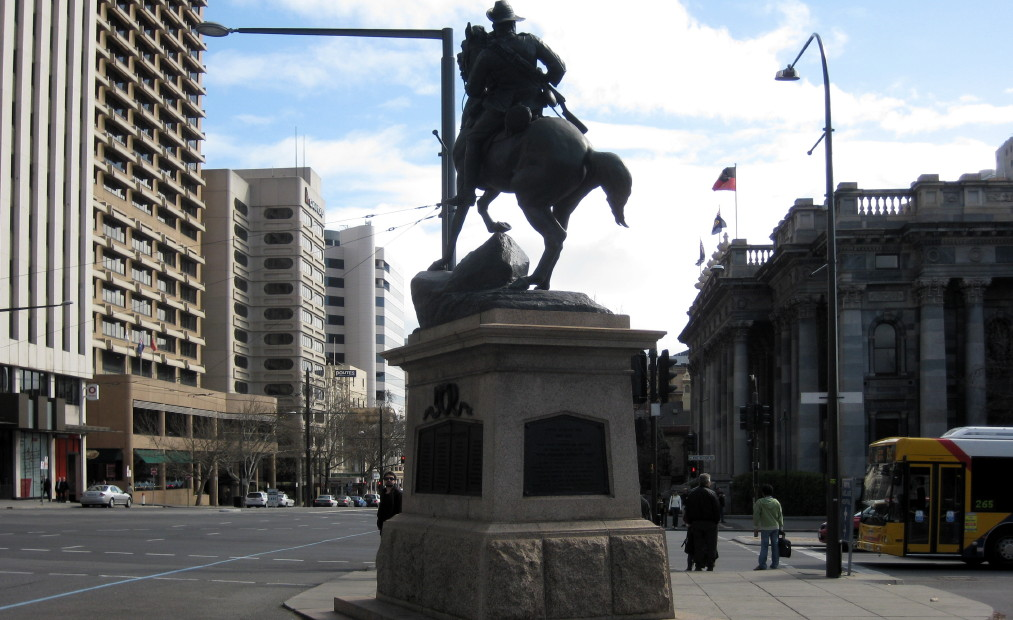
View of the South African War Memorial, looking West along North Terrace, circa 2008

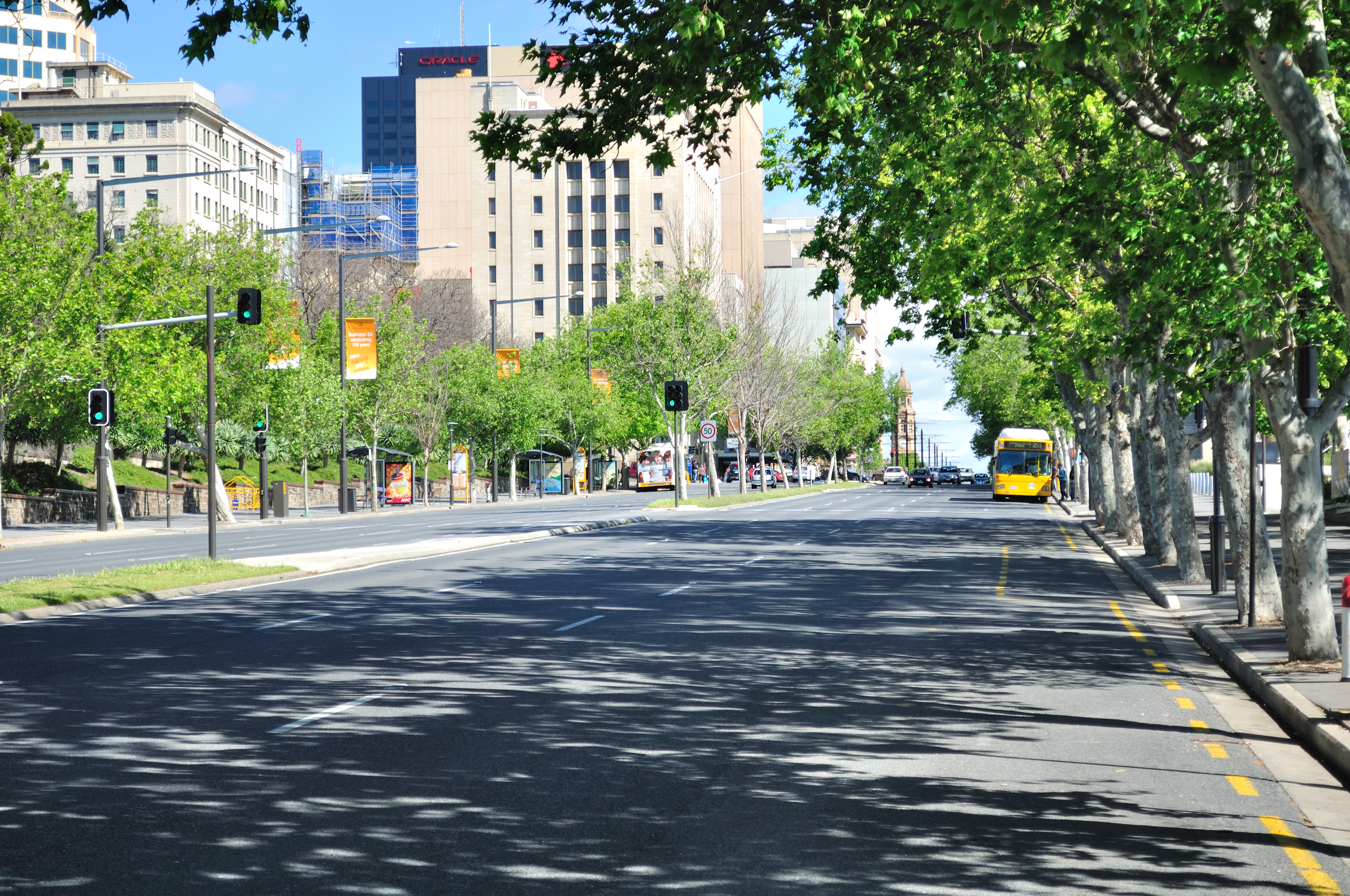
View to south along King William Road towards intersection with North Terrace

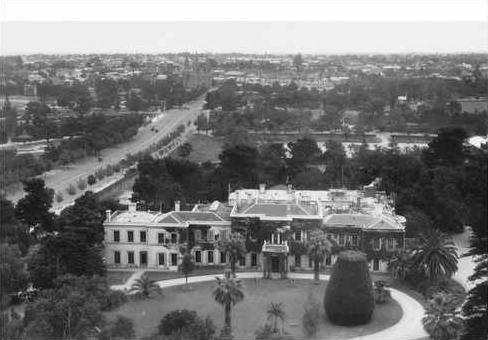
Government House, Adelaide in the 1930s

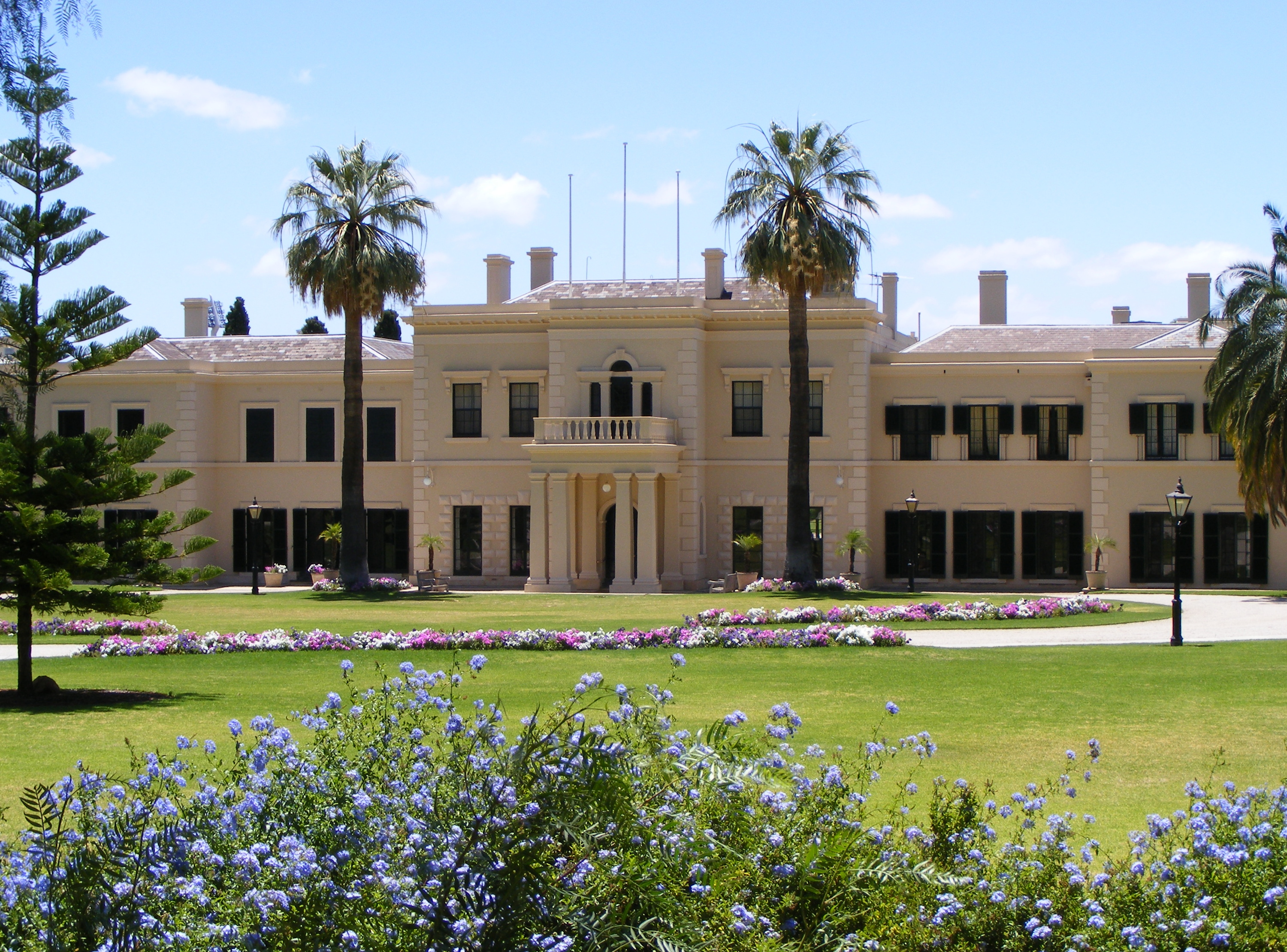
Government House, Adelaide

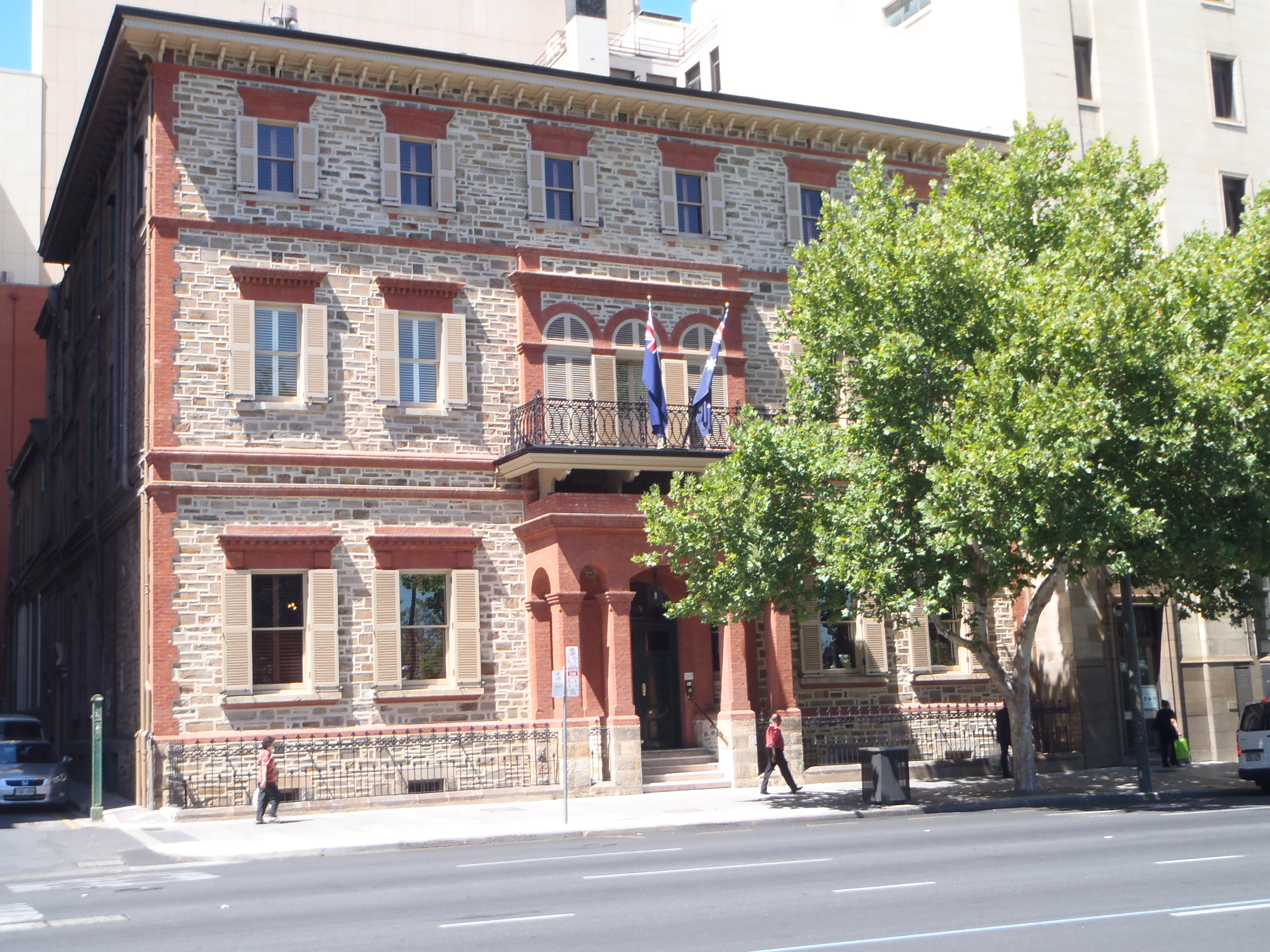
The Adelaide Club, 165 North Terrace

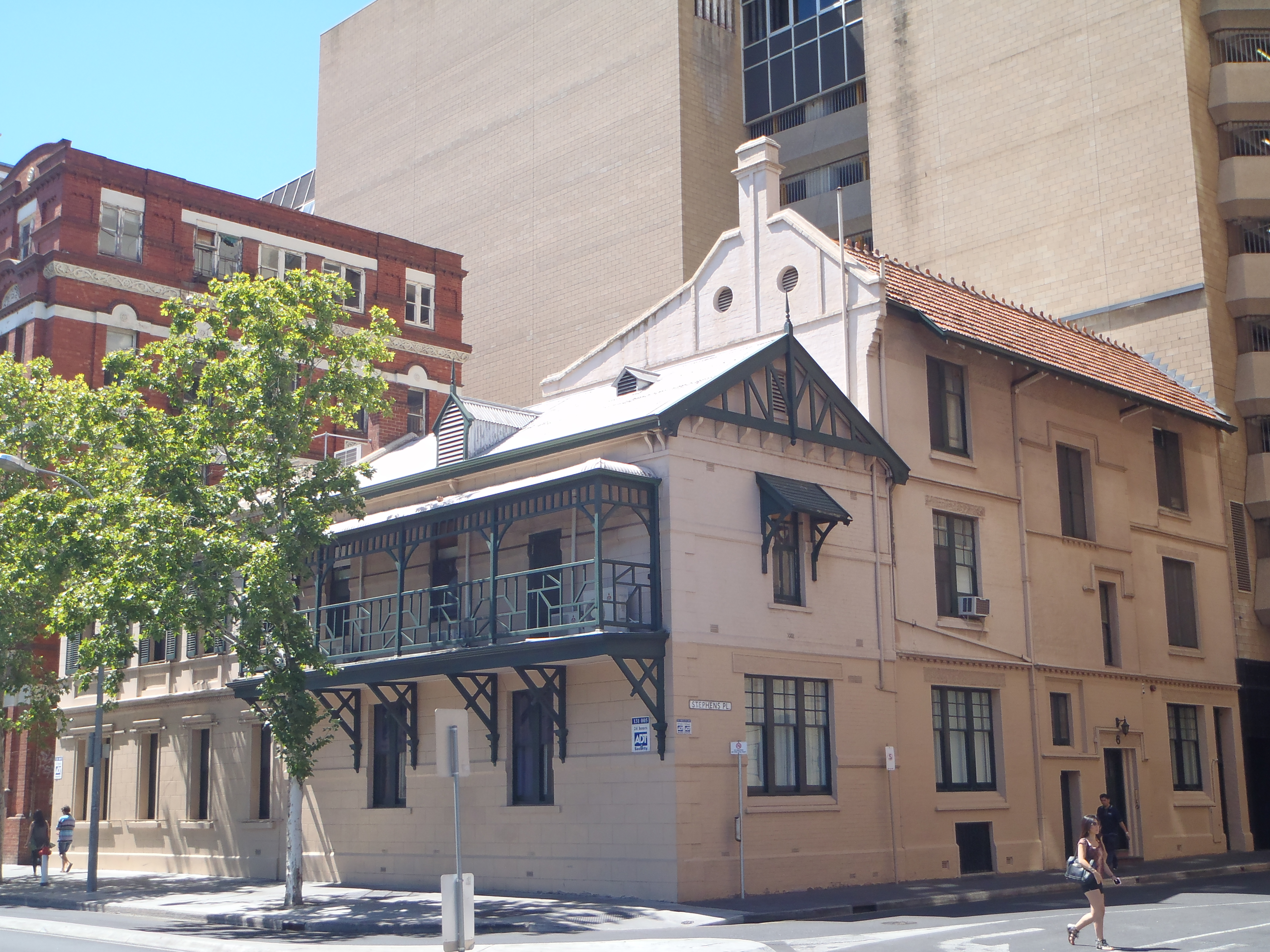
The Queen Adelaide Club, cnr North Terrace and Stephens Place

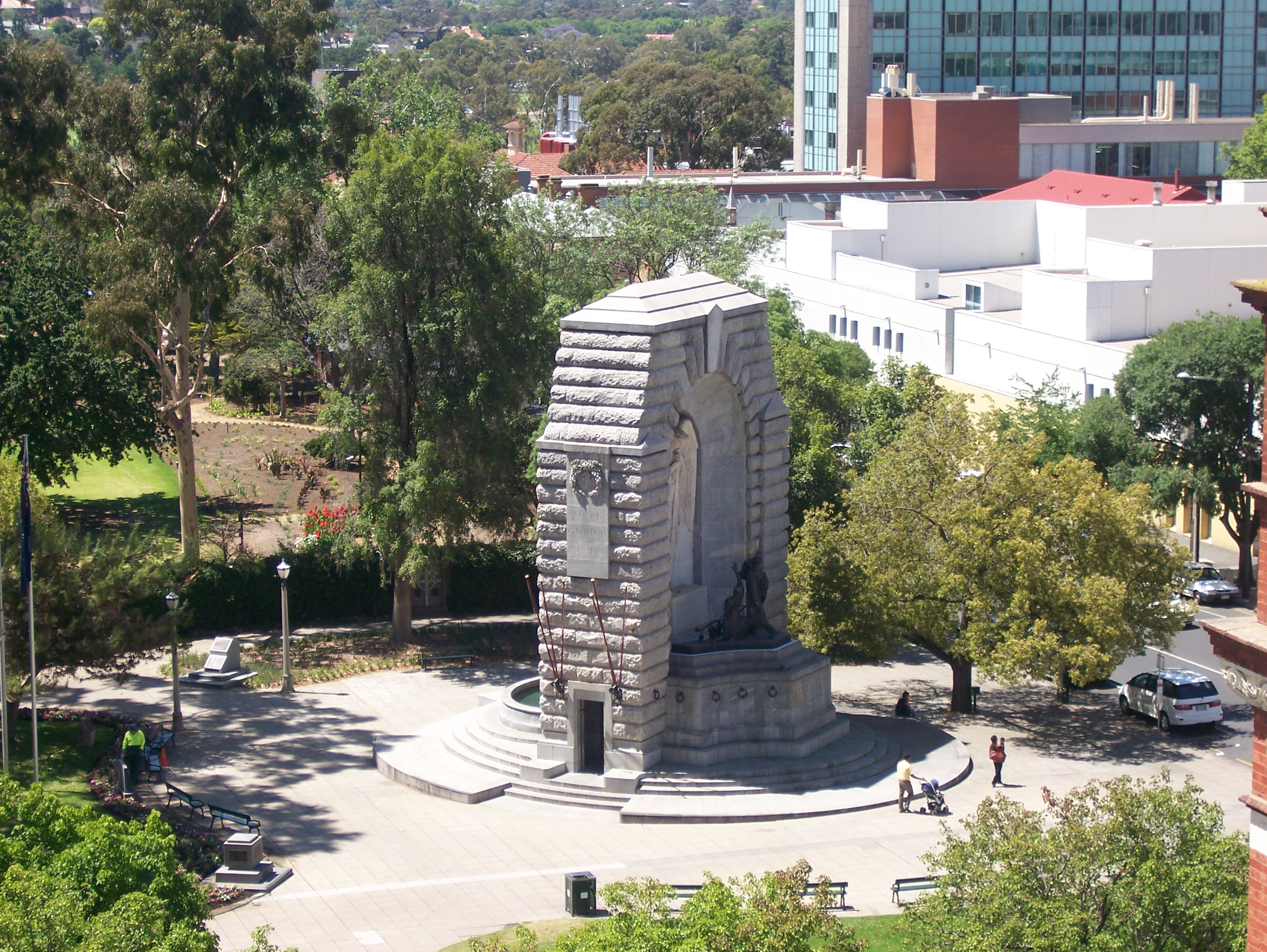
National War Memorial (South Australia)

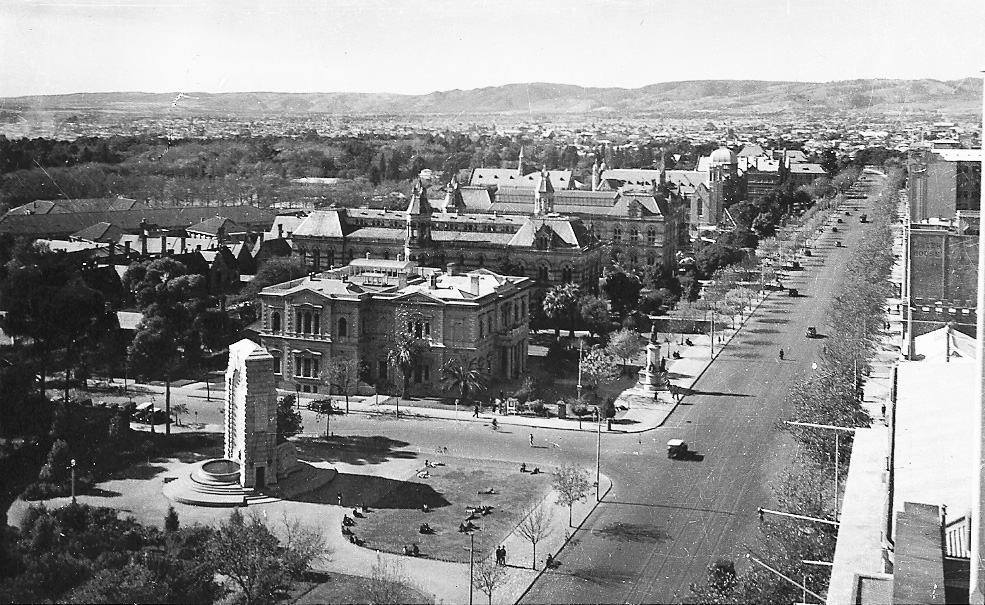
View of North Terrace, looking east from near King William Street, circa 1940

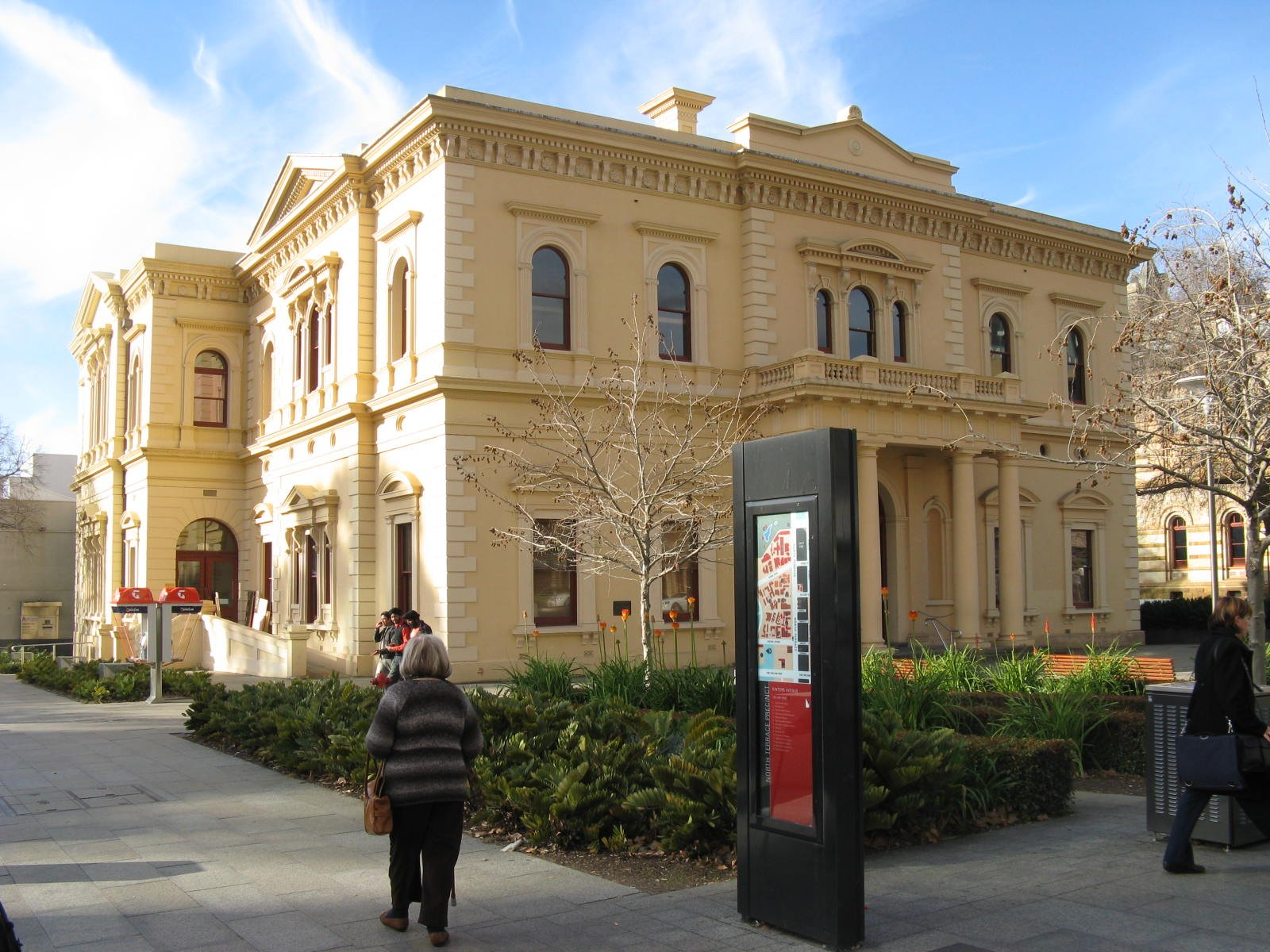
Institute Building (1859), now part of the State Library, housing the Sir Donald Bradman collection

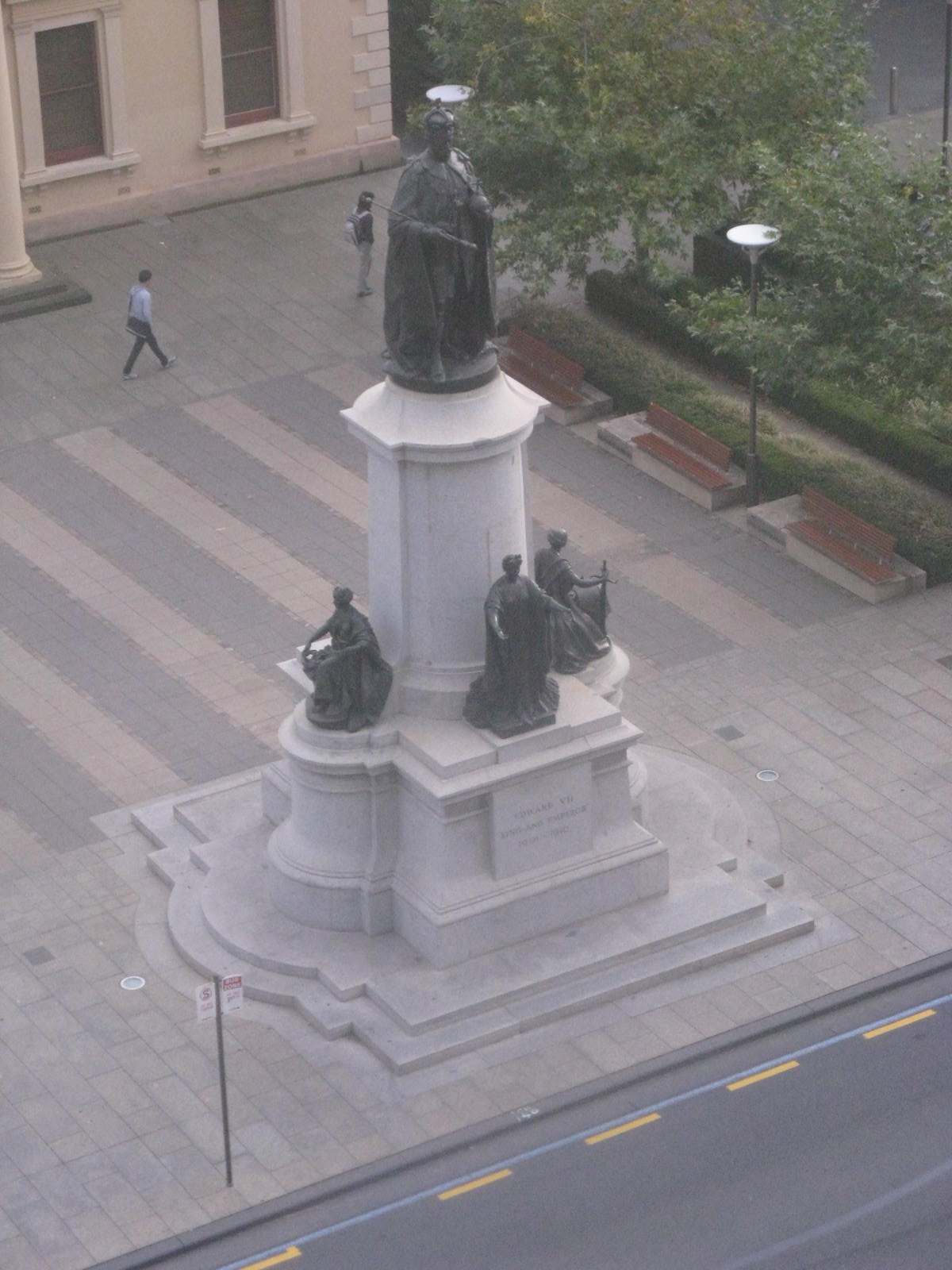
Statue of Edward VII in front of the Institute Building

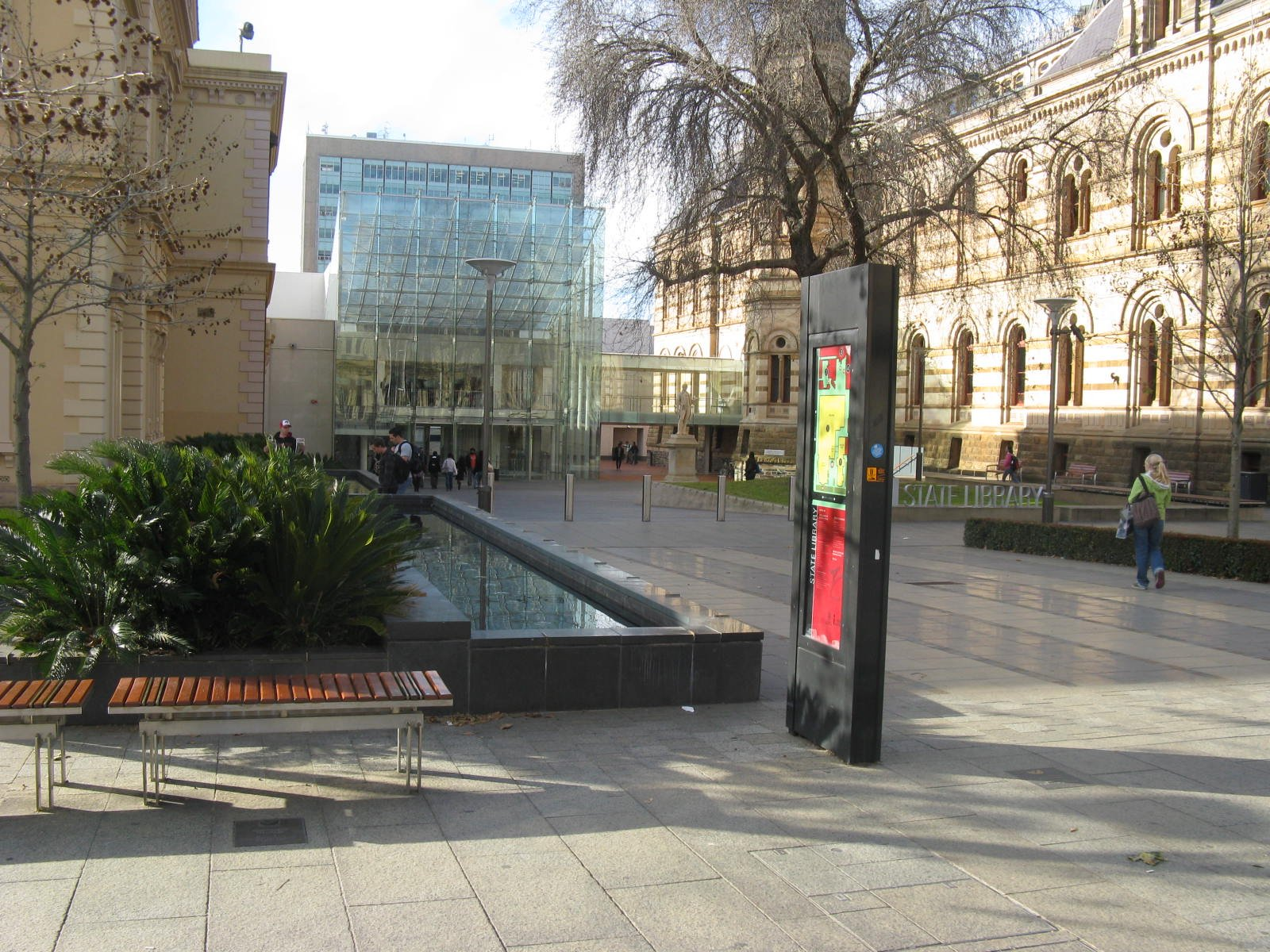
State Library entrance to Spence Wing

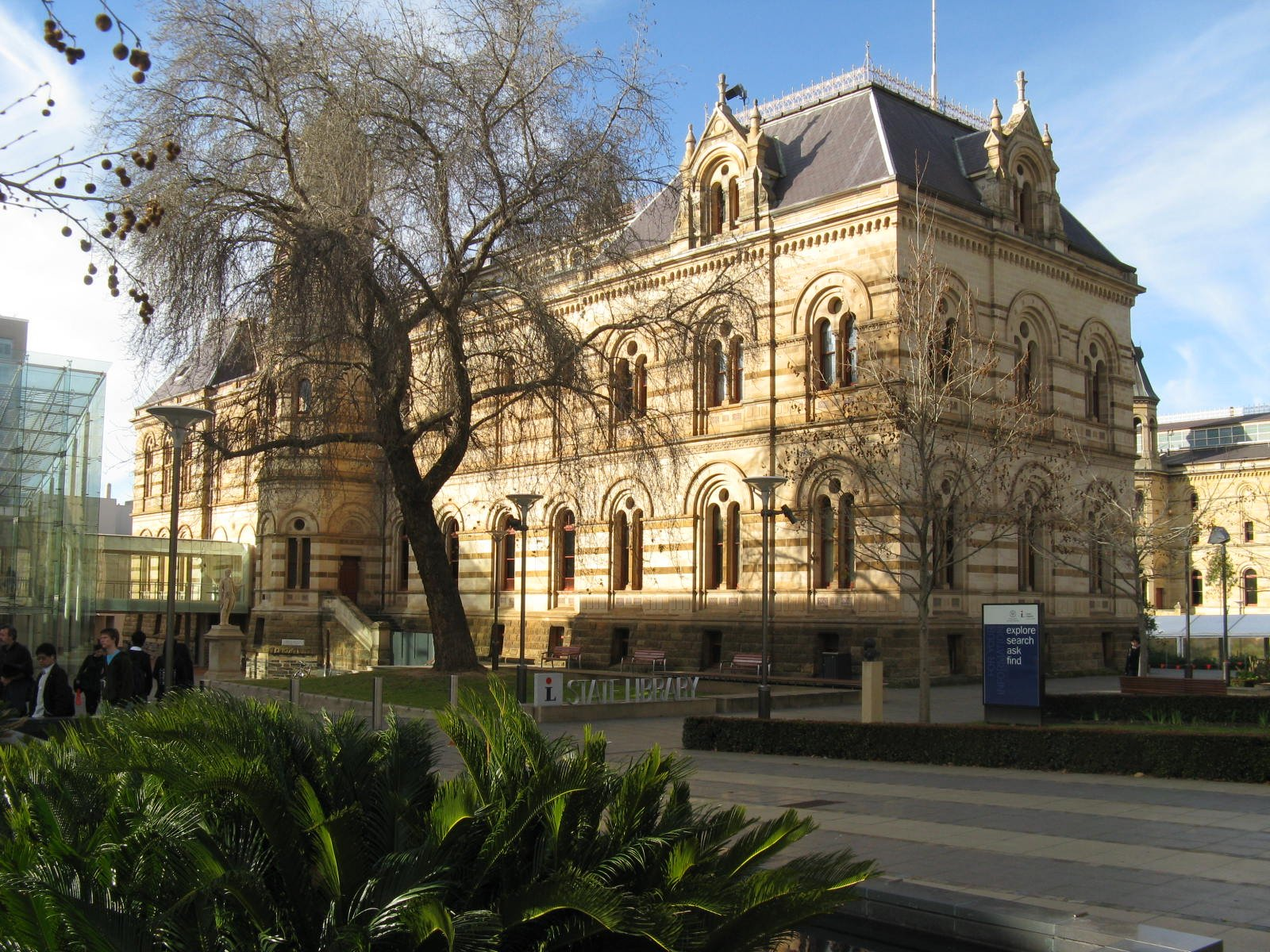
Mortlock Wing of the State Library

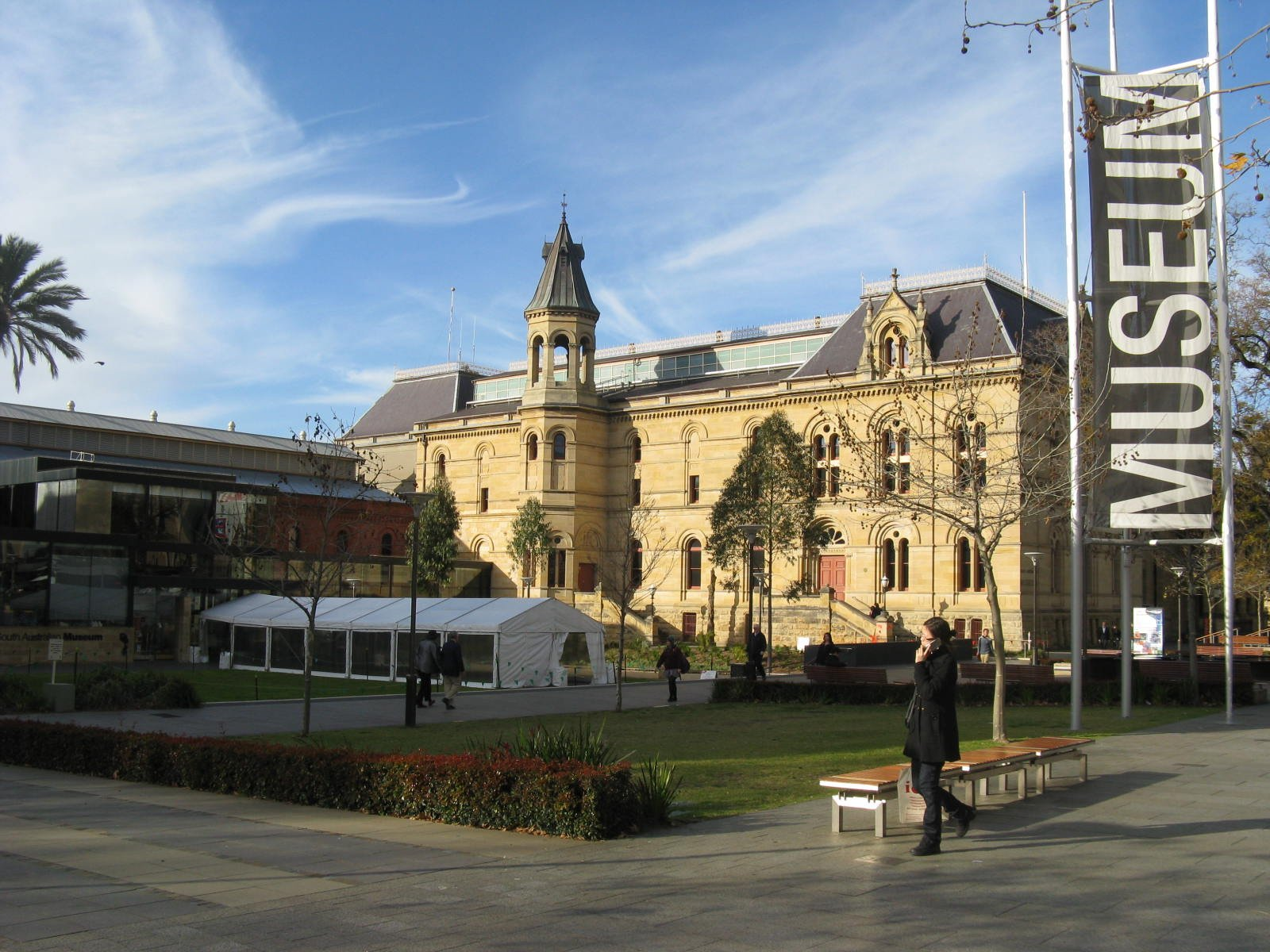
South Australian Museum Complex

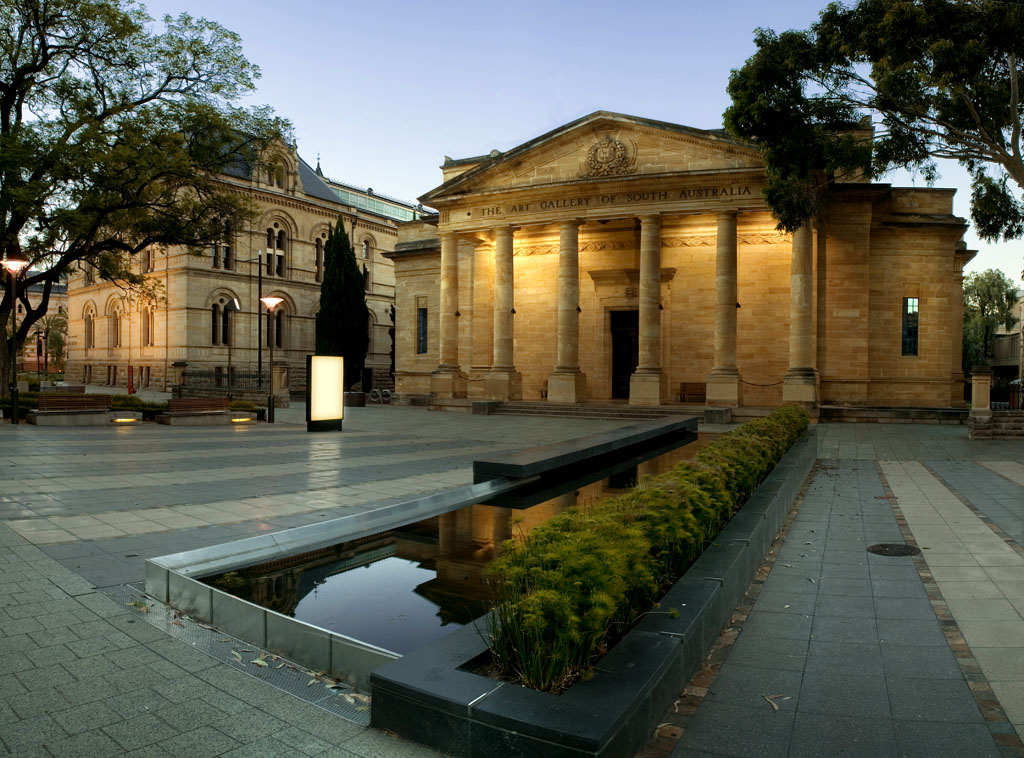
Art Gallery of South Australia and part of the South Australian Museum

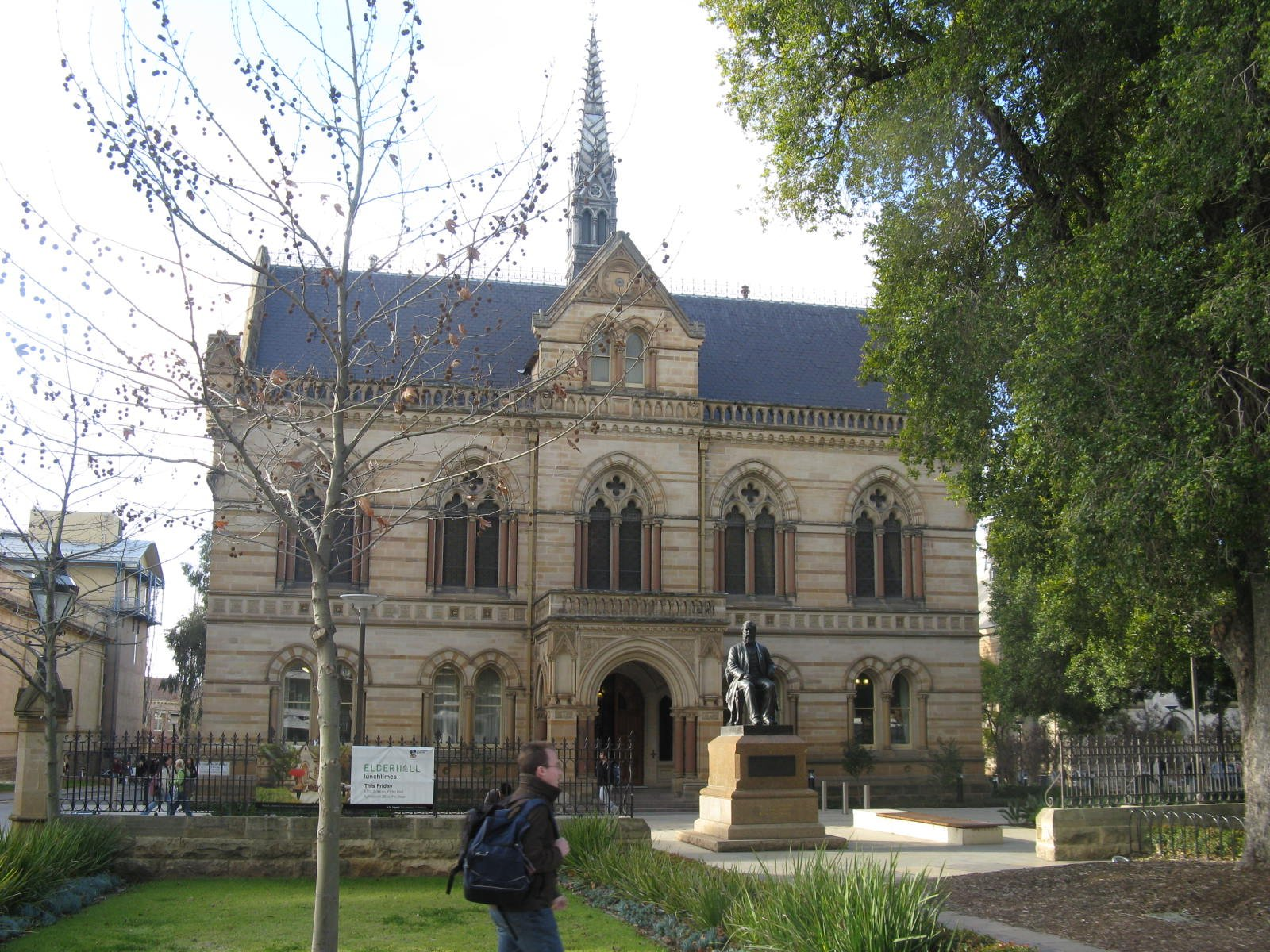
Mitchell Building, University of Adelaide

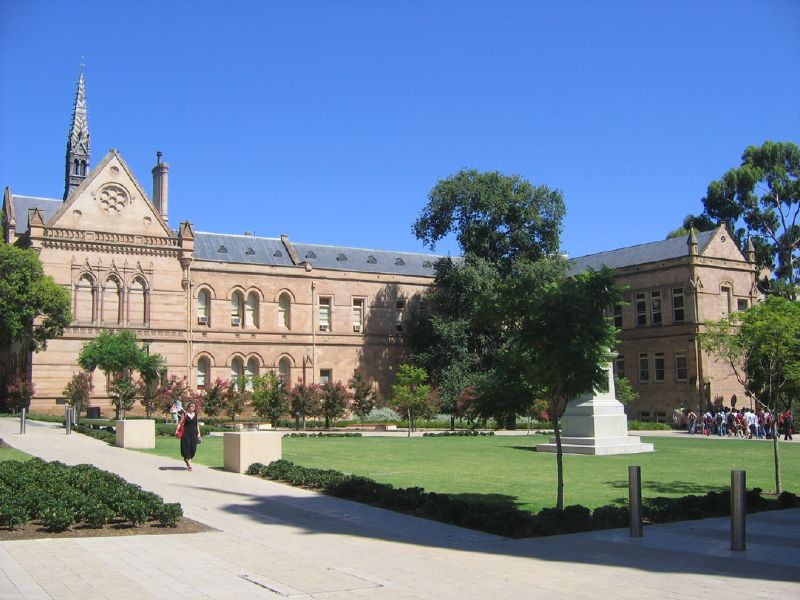
Eastern side of Mitchell Building, University of Adelaide

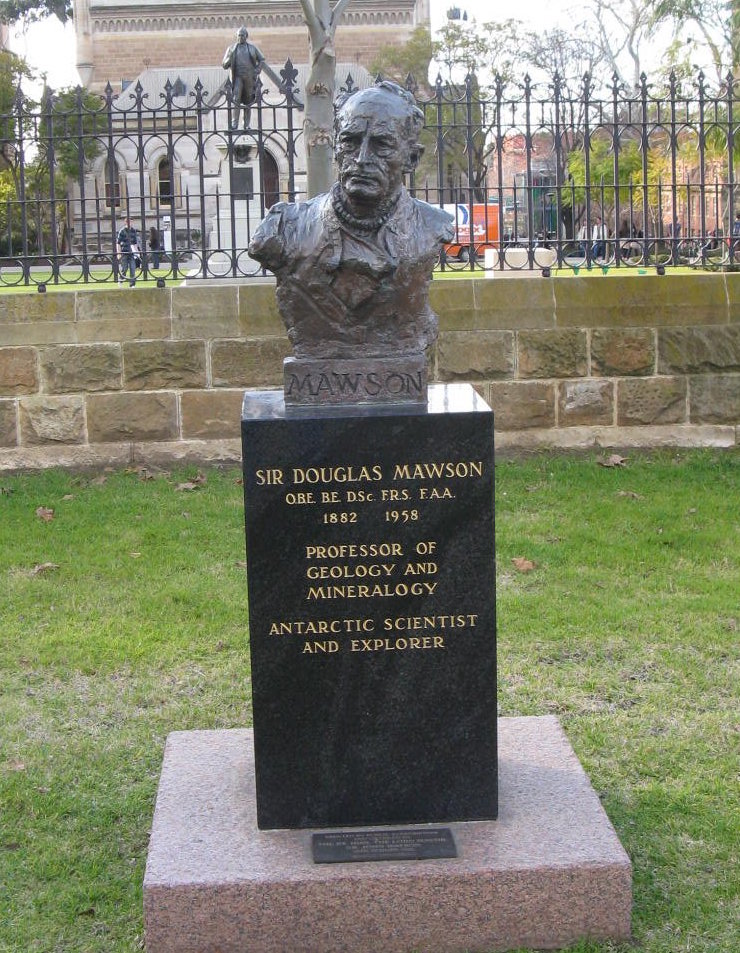
Bust of Sir Douglas Mawson & the Elder Conservatorium of Music, University of Adelaide

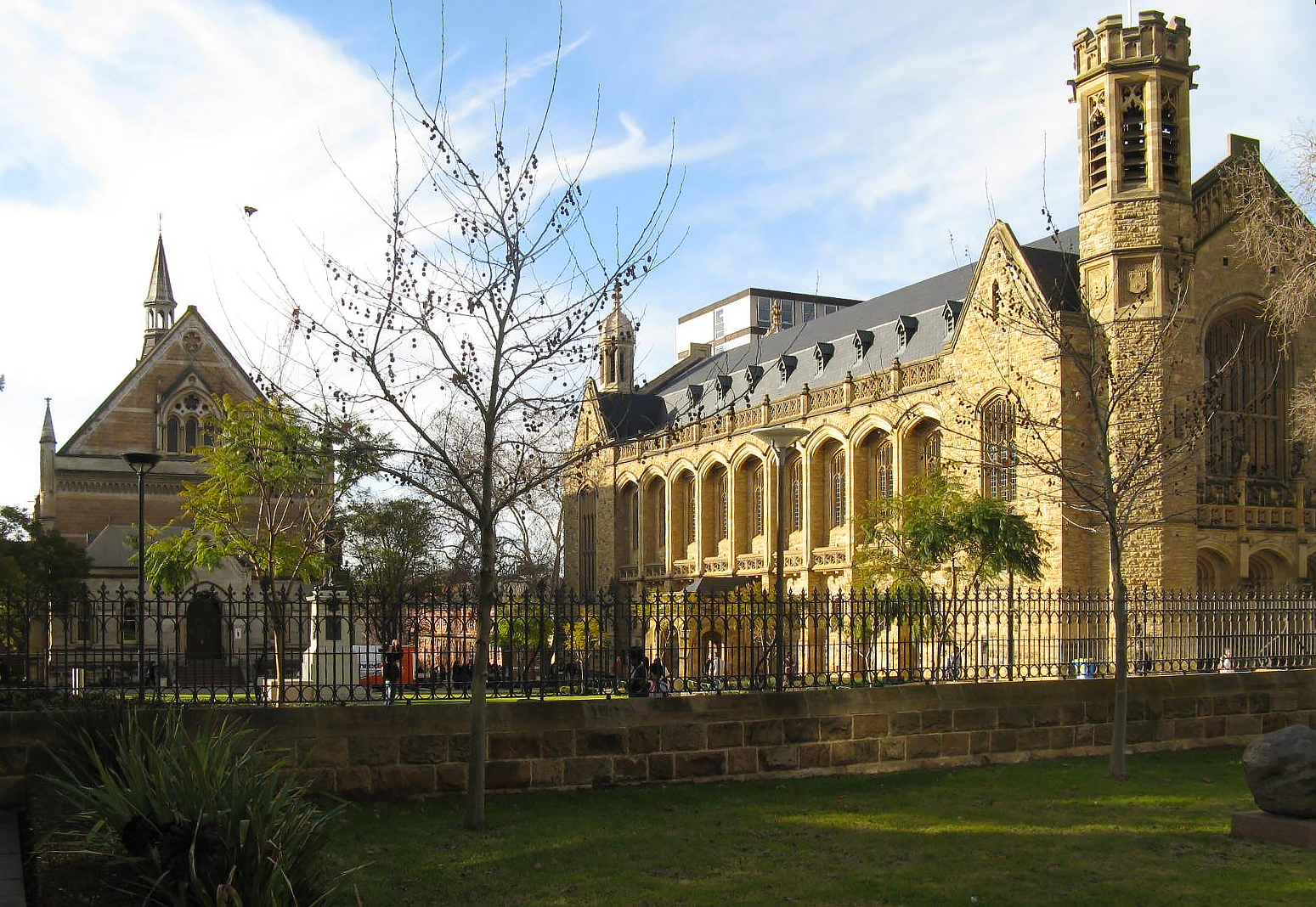
Bonython Hall & the Elder Conservatorium of Music, University of Adelaide

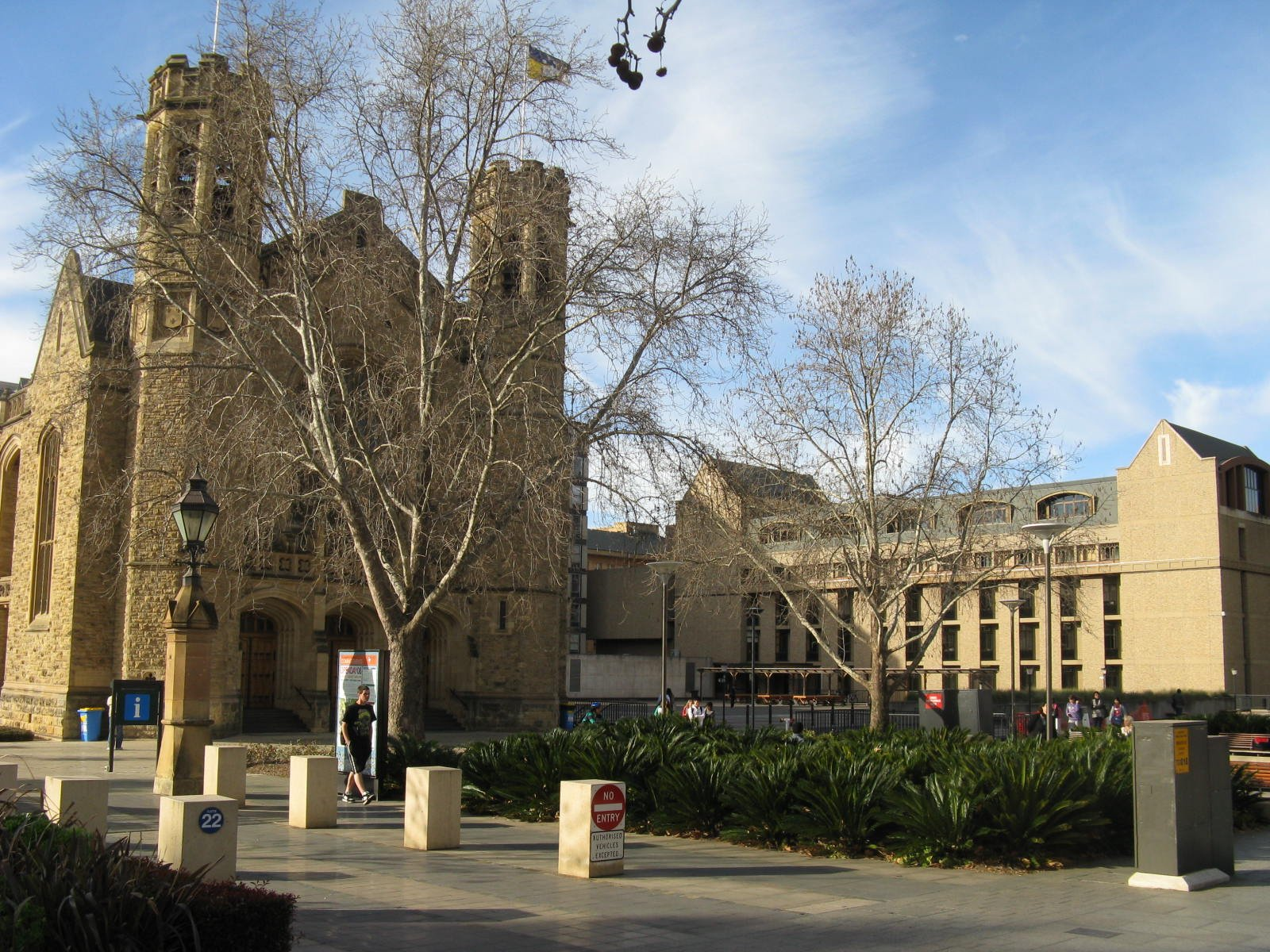
Bonython Hall & the Ligertwood Building, University of Adelaide

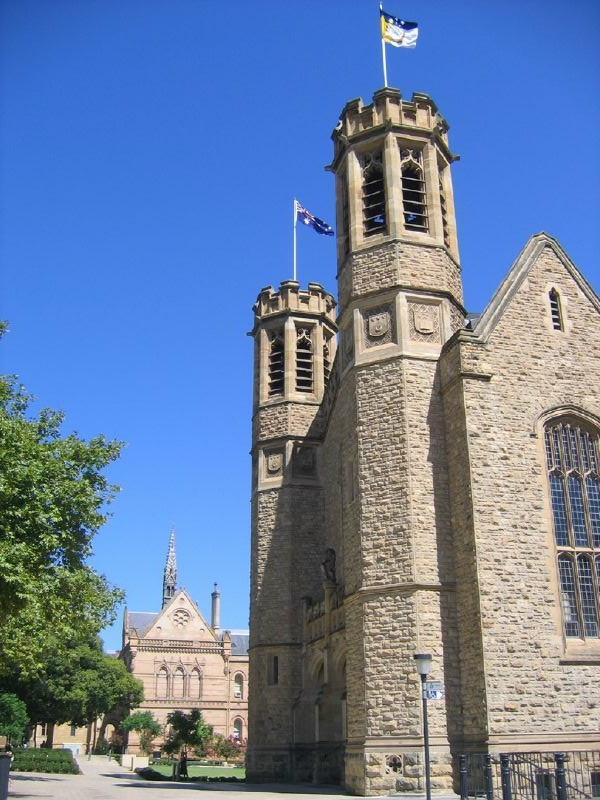
Bonython Hall, University of Adelaide (looking west)

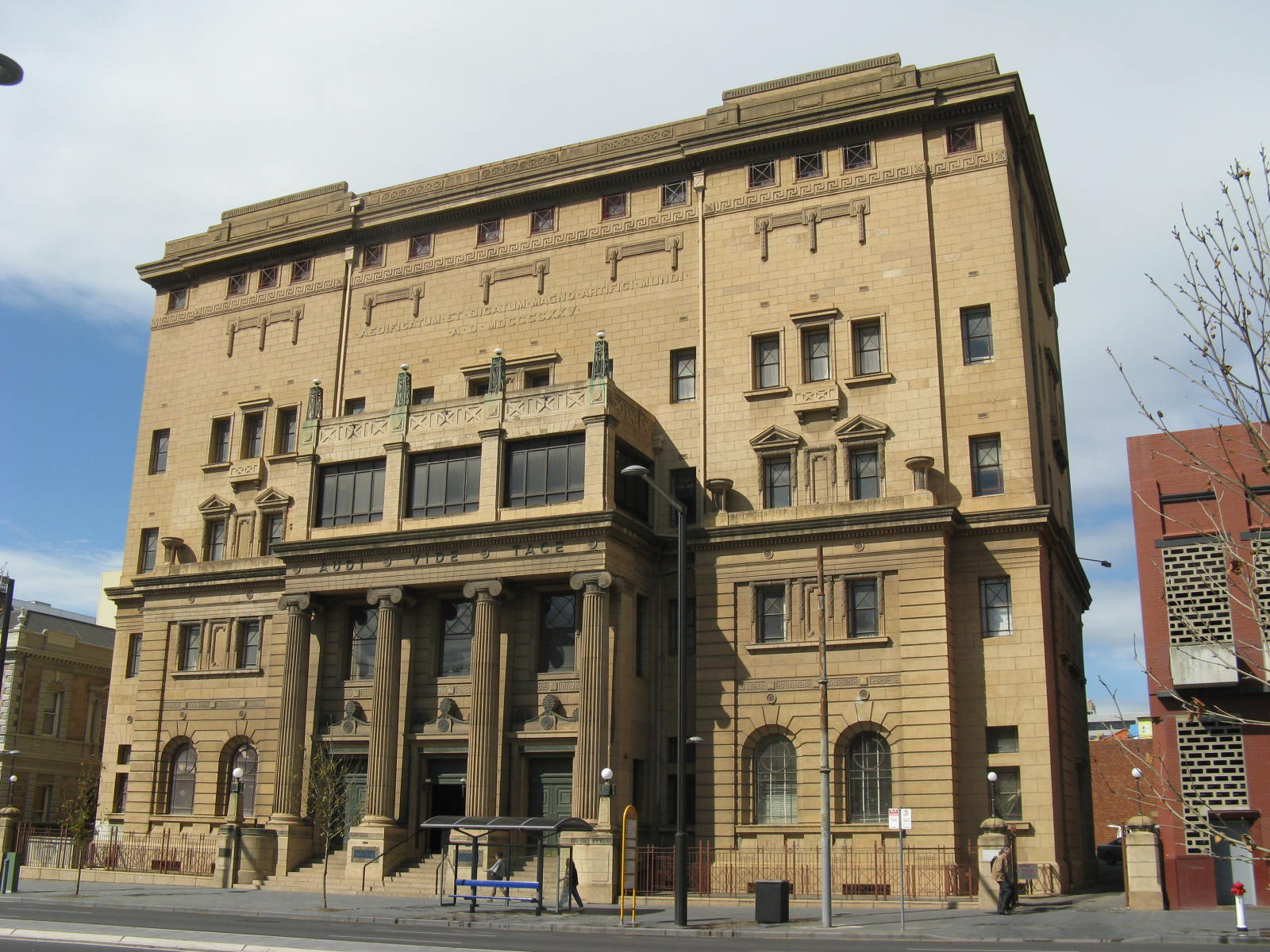
Freemasons Hall

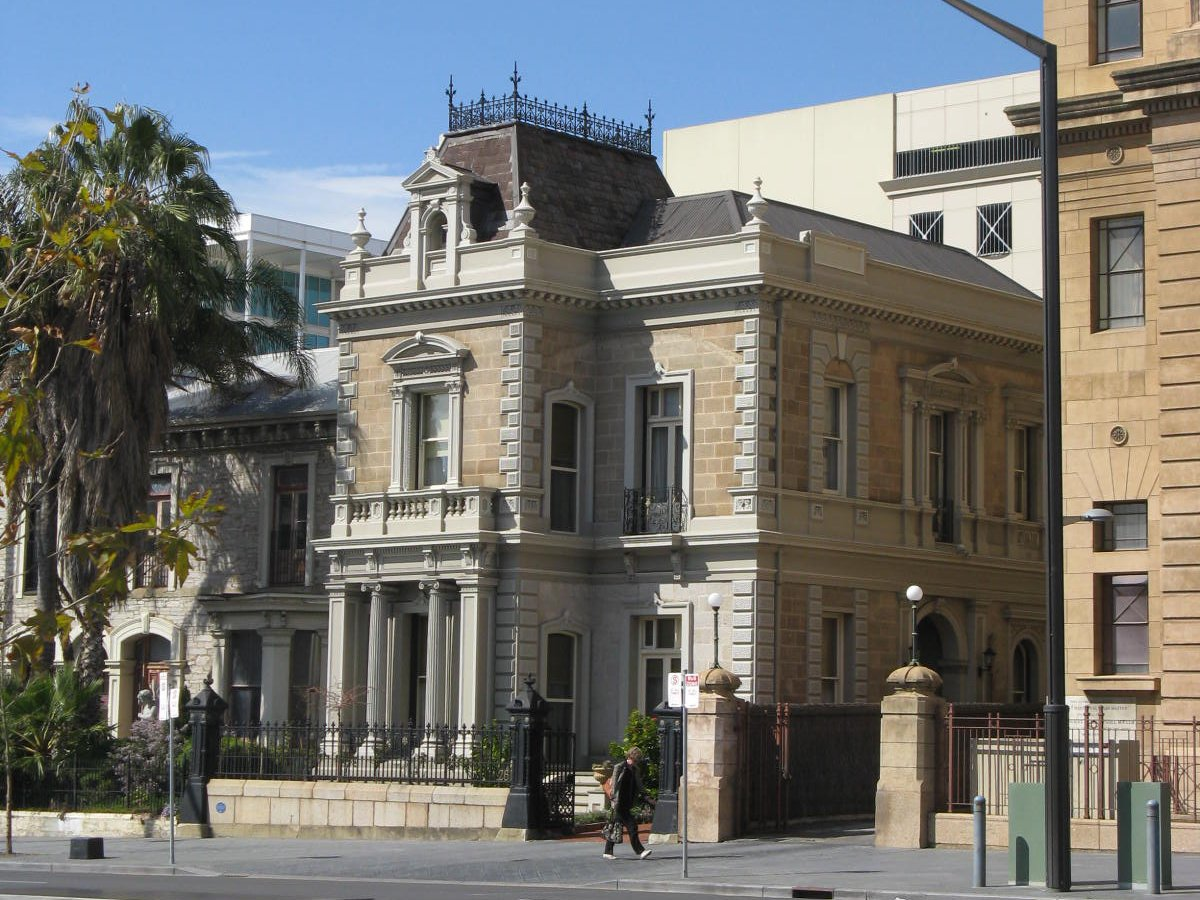
Waterhouse House

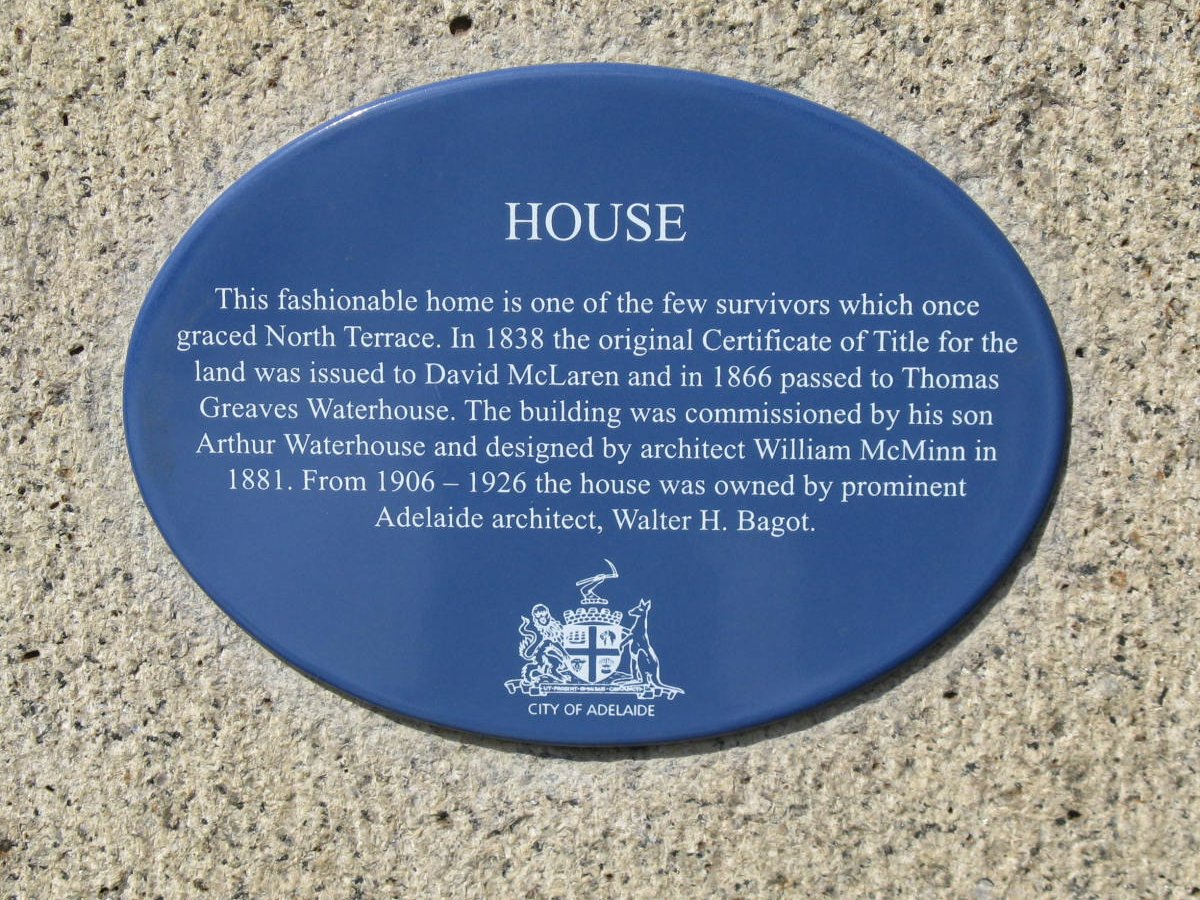
Waterhouse House history

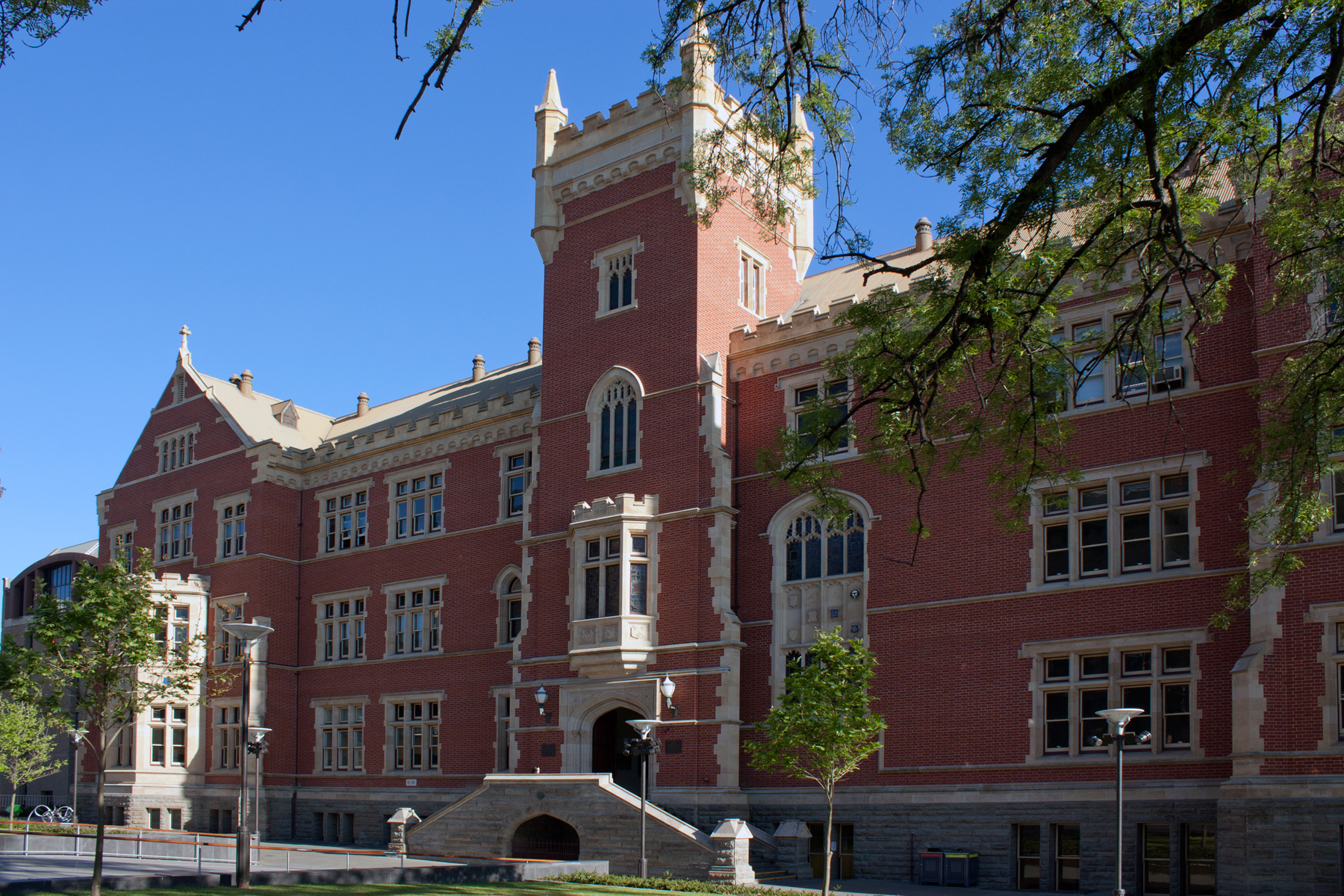
Old School of Mines building c.2010 - after renovation

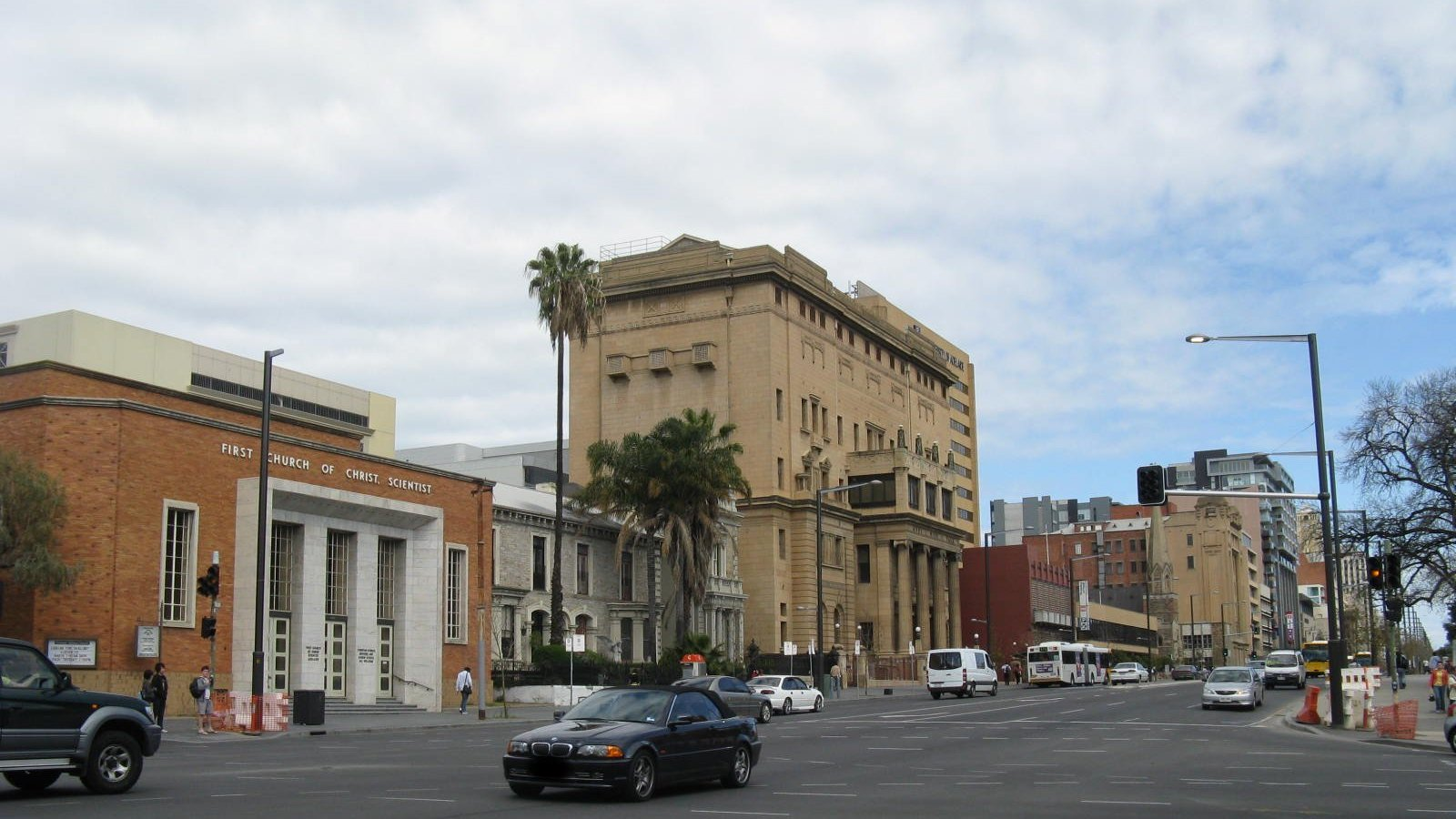
Looking south-west from Frome Road

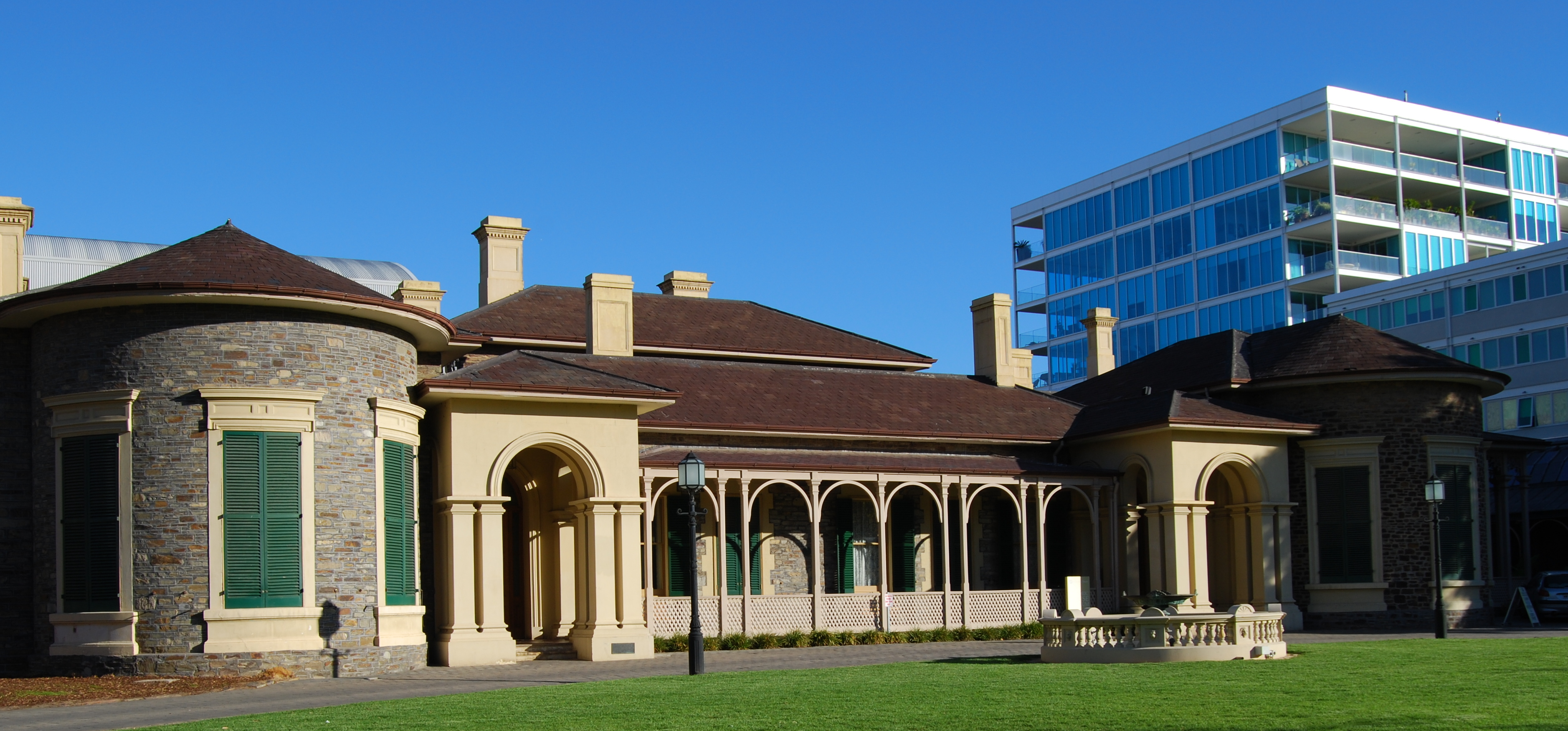
Ayers House

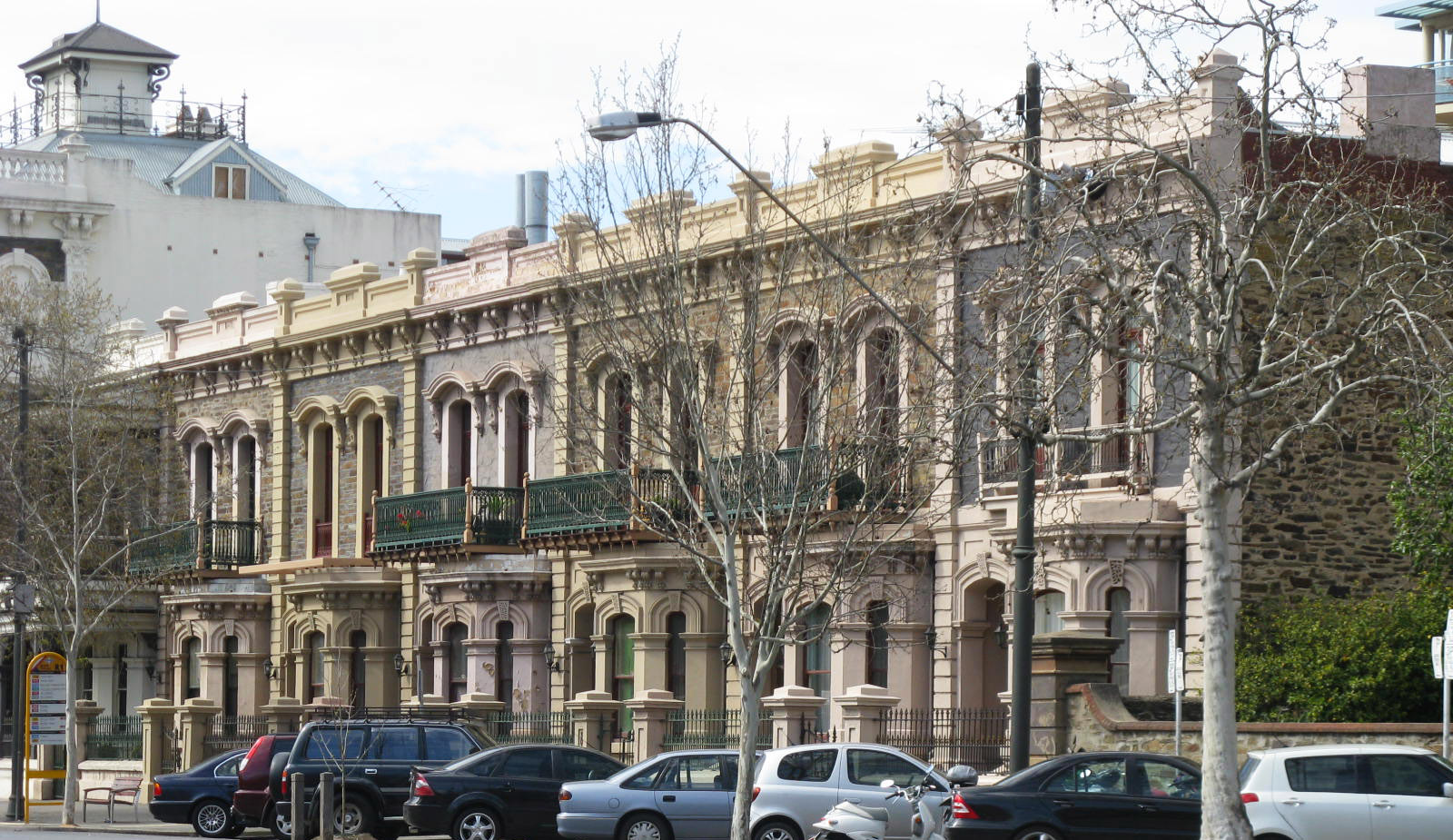
Terrace Houses, East End

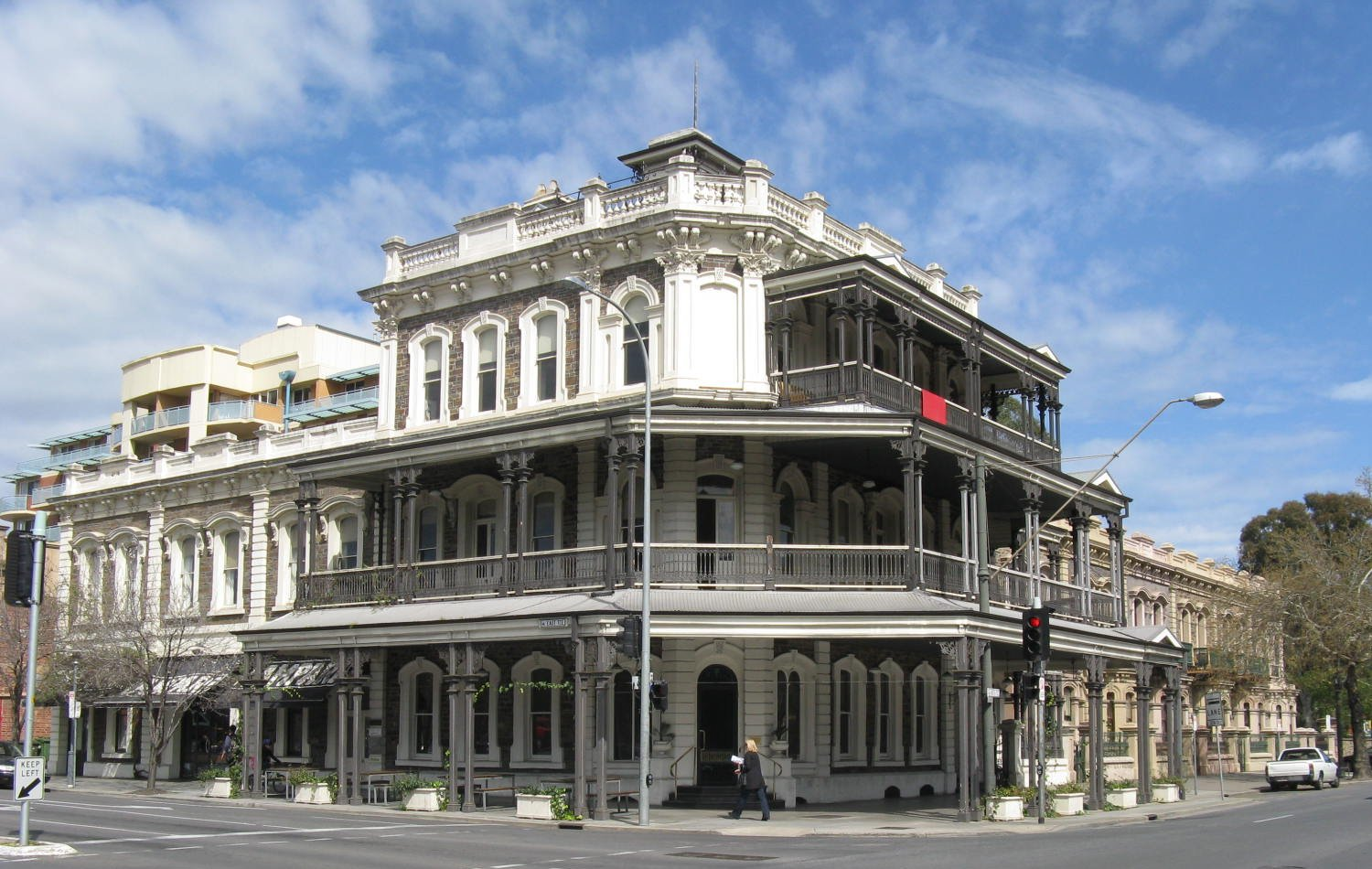
Botanic Hotel, cnr East and North Terraces

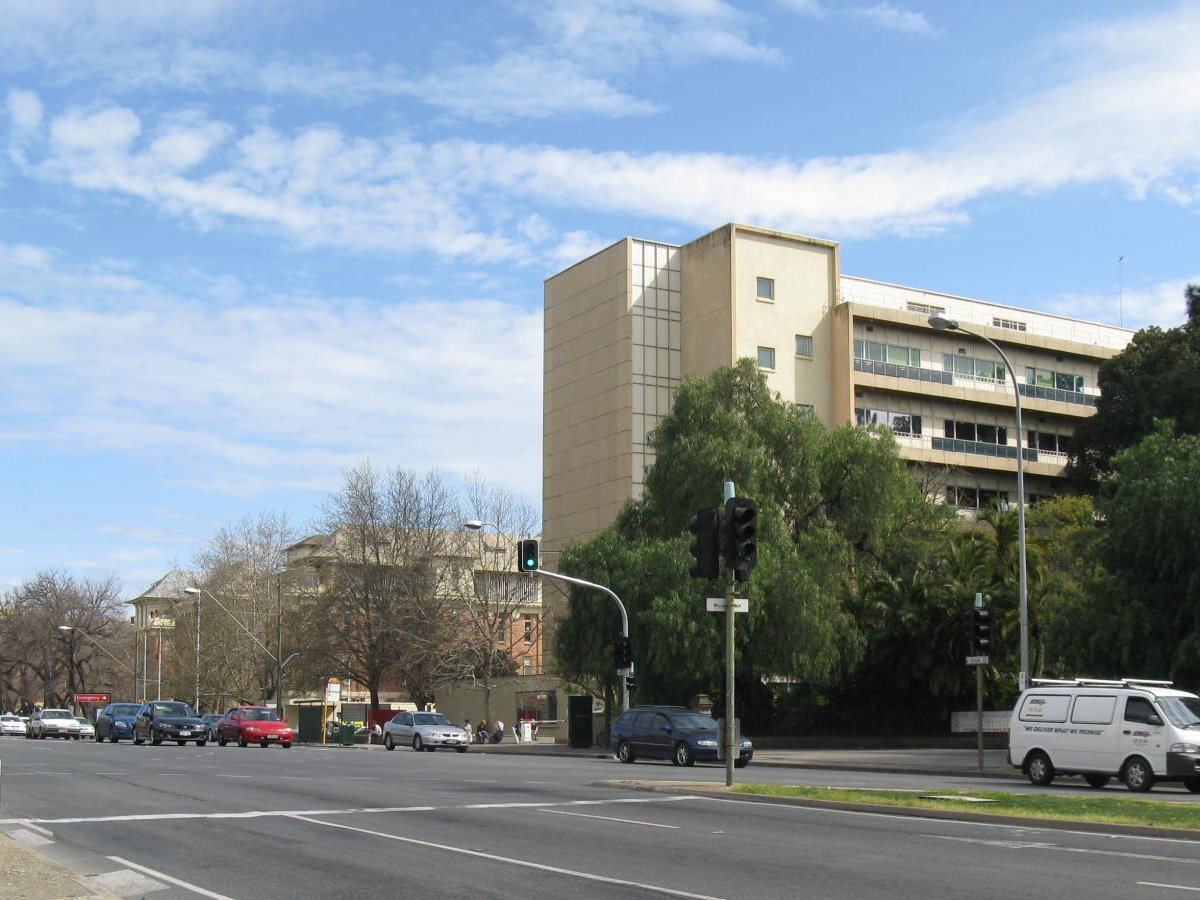
The old Royal Adelaide Hospital

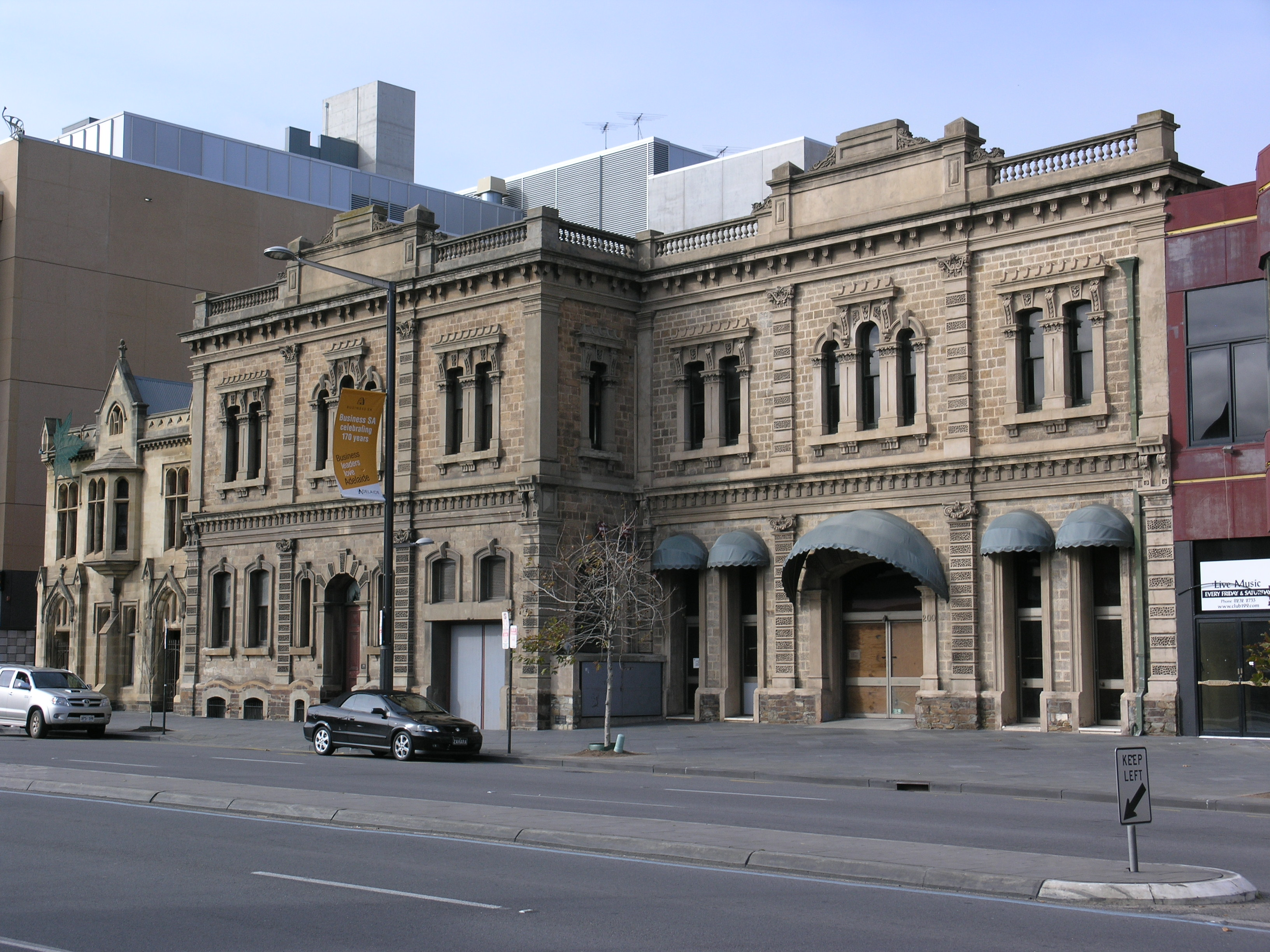
Buildings on North Terrace

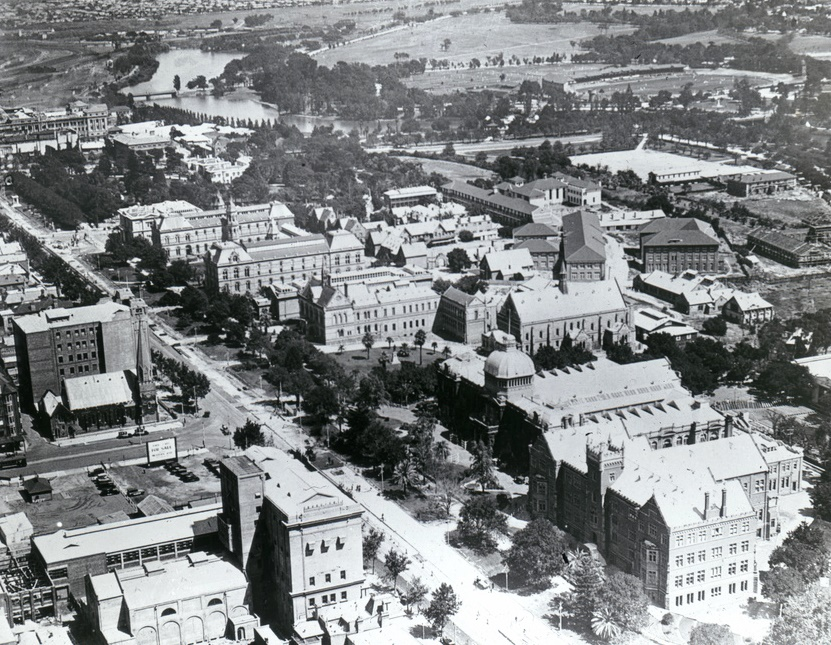
North Terrace in 1930

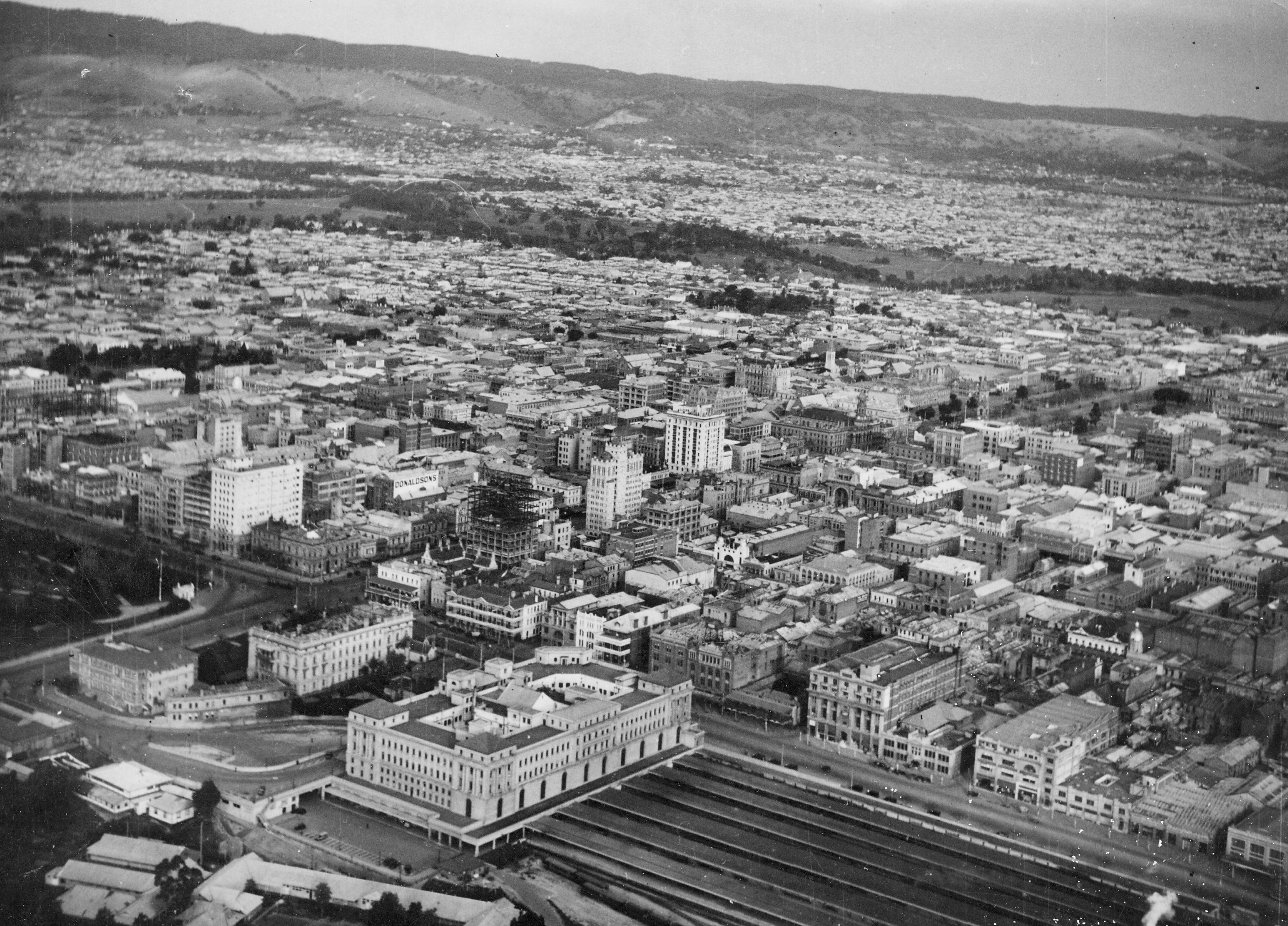
North Terrace in 1935

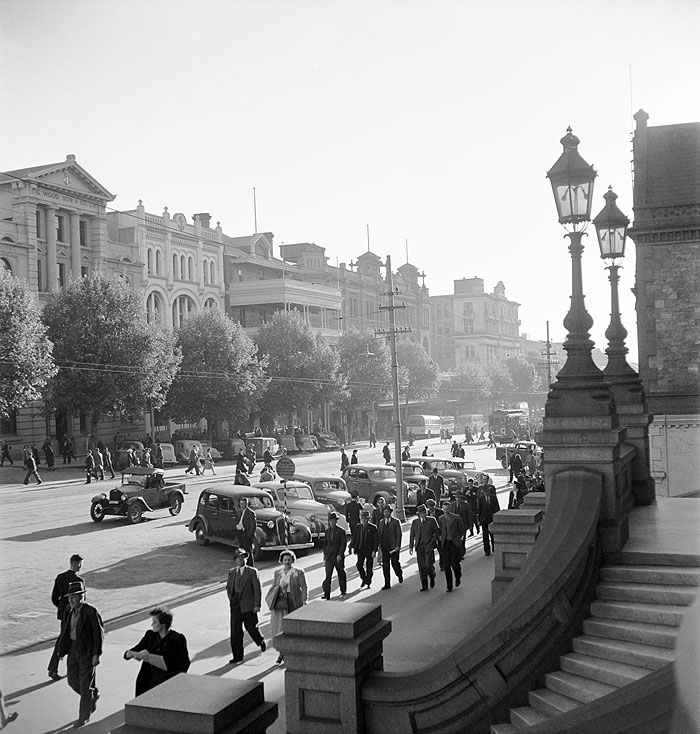
Outside Parliament House, looking at North terrace (1940)

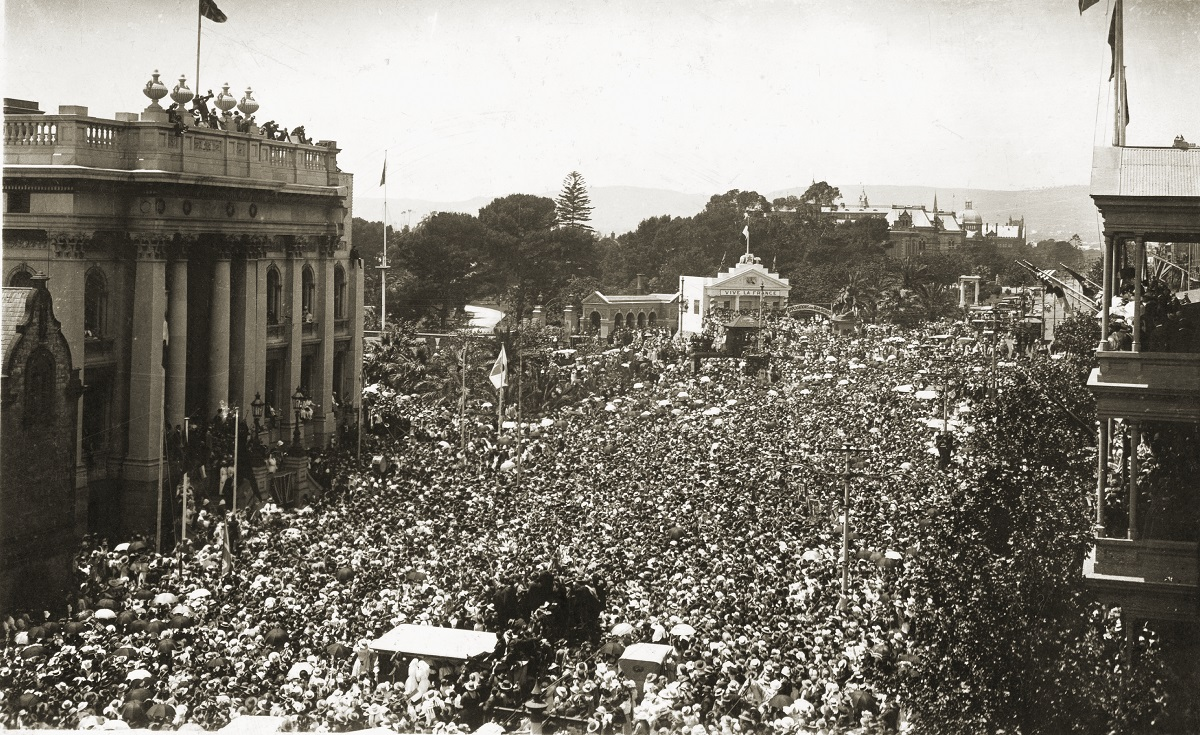
Parliament House (left) during Armistice Day address in North Terrace (1918)

== See also ==
- Australia Award for Urban Design
