= Buring =

Buring or Büring is a surname. Notable people with the surname include:

- Hermann Büring (1846–1919), Australian winemaker
- Leo Buring (1876–1961), Australian winemaker
- Meta Buring (1875–1955), Australian singer
- MyAnna Buring (born 1979), British actress
