= Park 12 =

Park in the Adelaide Park Lands, Australia

- Karrawirra
- Angas Gardens in 2026

- Location within City of Adelaide
- Type: Urban park and sporting grounds
- Location: Adelaide and North Adelaide, South Australia, Australia
- Coordinates: 34°54′51″S 138°36′06″E
- Operator: City of Adelaide
- Website: www.adelaide-parklands.asn.au/park-12

Park 12, (also referred to by its Kaurna name Karrawirra, meaning "river red gum forest") is one of the 29 parks that make up the Adelaide Park Lands. It consists of 55.5 hectares bounded by North Terrace, Frome Road, Sir Edwin Smith Avenue and King William Road.

Bisected by the River Torrens, the northern part of the park contains the University of Adelaide playing fields.

Along North Terrace, the southern part of the park contains the University of South Australia (City East campus), the University of Adelaide (main campus), the Art Gallery, the Museum, the State Library, the War Memorial, Government House, the Boer War Memorial, Prince Henry Gardens, the Jubilee 150 Walkway, and numerous statues.

The southern part also contains the Torrens Parade Ground, Jolley's Boat House, and a number of rowing club boathouses.

Park 12 is home to the Peace Park, Angas Gardens, Roberts Reserve, Grundy Gardens, the Cross of Sacrifice Garden, the South Australian Naval Memorial Garden, Lady Esther Lipman Gardens, Pioneer Women's Memorial Garden, Town Clerk's Avenue/Walk and the Pathway of Honour.

== Buildings ==
Buildings in Park 12 North of Victoria Drive include the following:

Description	Owner/licence holder
Gardeners Shed (Brick & Stone)	Adelaide City Council
Jolley's Boathouse Restaurant (Note: Jolley's Boathouse description in CLMP Karrawirra (Park 12), p. 17: Located in the River Torrens portion of the park, the two-storey Jolley's Boathouse and restaurant composed within a timber and sheet metal clad structure dating from the 1910s following the 1914 fire of the original Jolley's Boathouse.)	Lessee: Jolley's Boathouse Bistro Pty Ltd
Lunch Room and Toilet (former Victoria Avenue Police Station) (Note: Victoria Avenue Police Station description in CLMP Karrawirra (Park 12), p. 18: Located in the River Torrens portion of the park, positioned in the north-west corner of Victoria Drive overlooking the River Torrens, a single-storey rendered-brick, cream-coloured structure featuring portico, wrought iron security bars on windows, and red terra cotta roof tiling all composed in a Spanish architectural style. Designed and erected in 1928 to serve as a Water Police Station to police watercraft and water-based recreational activities on the River Torrens, its Spanish architectural style is similar to the Hartley Building in Kintore Avenue erected in the late 1920s, and it was in use until 1956. It is now used by the gardeners as a lunch room, office and store.)	Adelaide City Council
Gardeners' shed (brick and stone)	Adelaide City Council
Pumphouse bunker	Adelaide City Council
Gardeners' shed (brick and stone)	Adelaide City Council
Gardeners' shed (brick and stone)	Adelaide City Council
Gardeners' shed (wood and iron)	Adelaide City Council
Adelaide University Pavilion (Note: Adelaide University Pavilion description in CLMP Karrawirra (Park 12), p. 16:Located in the University Oval portion of the park, a prominent and elegantly designed grand stand structure including 5 gables, wrought iron metal strap seats, Mintaro slate steps, wrought iron support posts, and plaque.)	Adelaide City Council
Adelaide University building	Licence Holder: University of Adelaide
Adelaide University shed	Licence holder: University of Adelaide
Adelaide University Score Board/Store (Dean Dawson Memorial scorers' box and plaque) (Note: Adelaide University Score Board/Store description in CLMP Karrawirra (Park 12), p. 16: Located in the University Oval portion of the park on the edge of the oval, a small two-storey cricket scorers' box with plaque recording Dean Dawson as the Captain of the first University of Adelaide Inter-Varsity Football Team in 1904, and donated by KT Hamilton as erected in 1920. This box replaced an earlier box, and was donated by Alex J Melrose in 1920.)	Licence holder: University of Adelaide
Lounder's Boathouse (Popeye's Boathouse) (Note: Lounder's Boathouse description in CLMP Karrawirra (Park 12), p 17: Located in the River Torrens portion of the park on the River Torrens, a single-storey green-painted timber and red-painted galvanised-roofed rectangular structure with feature finial dating from the 1910s associated with the Popeye (boat) licence.)	Lessee: Keith A & Elma H Altmann and Tony T & Lidija B Shuman
Prince Alfred College Rowing Club (Note: Prince Alfred College Rowing Club description in CLMP Karrawirra (Park 12), p. 17: Located in the University Oval portion of the park, a two-storey gabled iron-roofed structure sited on War Memorial Drive overlooking the river and erected c.1930. While the College and the Old Collegians Association had been active in rowing before 1930, it was the enthusiasm of rower HWA Miller that enabled the association to advance £1250 to construct a boat house and to buy rowing boats. An Edwardian red and white painted timber slat structure with red painted gabled corrugated iron roof was erected; it was opened on 10 December 1930 by ex-Headmaster WR Bayly.)	Lessee: Prince Alfred College Incorporated
Adelaide University Rowing Building (Note: Adelaide University Rowing Building description in CLMP Karrawirra (Park 12), p. 17: Located in the University Oval portion of the park, a two-storey gabled iron-roofed structure sited on War Memorial Drive overlooking the River. Designed in an Edwardian style by architects English & Soward. Robert Barr Smith funded the "handsome boathouse," measuring 18.2 x 9.1m, at a cost of £750. The boatshed included a balcony that provided views of the lake and a finishing line for races and electric lighting. Extensively changed and altered since 1910.)	Lessee: The University of Adelaide
Christian Brothers College Boathouse (Note: Christian Brothers College Boathouse description in CLMP Karrawirra (Park 12), p. 17: Christian Brothers College Boathouse: Located in the University Oval portion of the park, a nondescript red-brick two-storey structure sited on War Memorial Drive overlooking the River. Erected in 1961 by builders Blunden & Co at a cost of £8,000.)	Lessee: The Christian Brothers Incorporated
Torrens Rowing Club Building (Note: Torrens Rowing Club Building description in CLMP Karrawirra (Park 12), p. 17: Torrens Rowing Club Boathouse: Located in the River Torrens portion of the Park next to Jolley's Boathouse, a contemporary two-storey red-brick structure, with club formation origins dating back to 1903.)	Lessee: Torrens Rowing Club Incorporated
Adelaide High School Rowing Club Building (Note: Adelaide High School Rowing Club Building description in CLMP Karrawirra (Park 12), p. 17: Located in the River Torrens portion of the park on the River Torrens, a two-storey skillion-roofed red-brick structure with balcony erected in the 1970s replacing an earlier structure.)	Lessee: Minister for Education and Children's Services
St Peter's College Rowing Club (Note: St Peter's College Rowing Club description in CLMP Karrawirra (Park 12), p. 17: Located in the River Torrens portion of the park on the River Torrens, a two-storey red-brick structure with gabled roof in one portion and skillion on the other.)	Lessee: The Anglican Church of Australia Collegiate School of Saint Peter
Implement shed	Adelaide City Council
Sewer vent house (Frome Road)	SA Water
Pump house (at the Zoo Bridge)	Adelaide City Council

=== University Footbridge ===
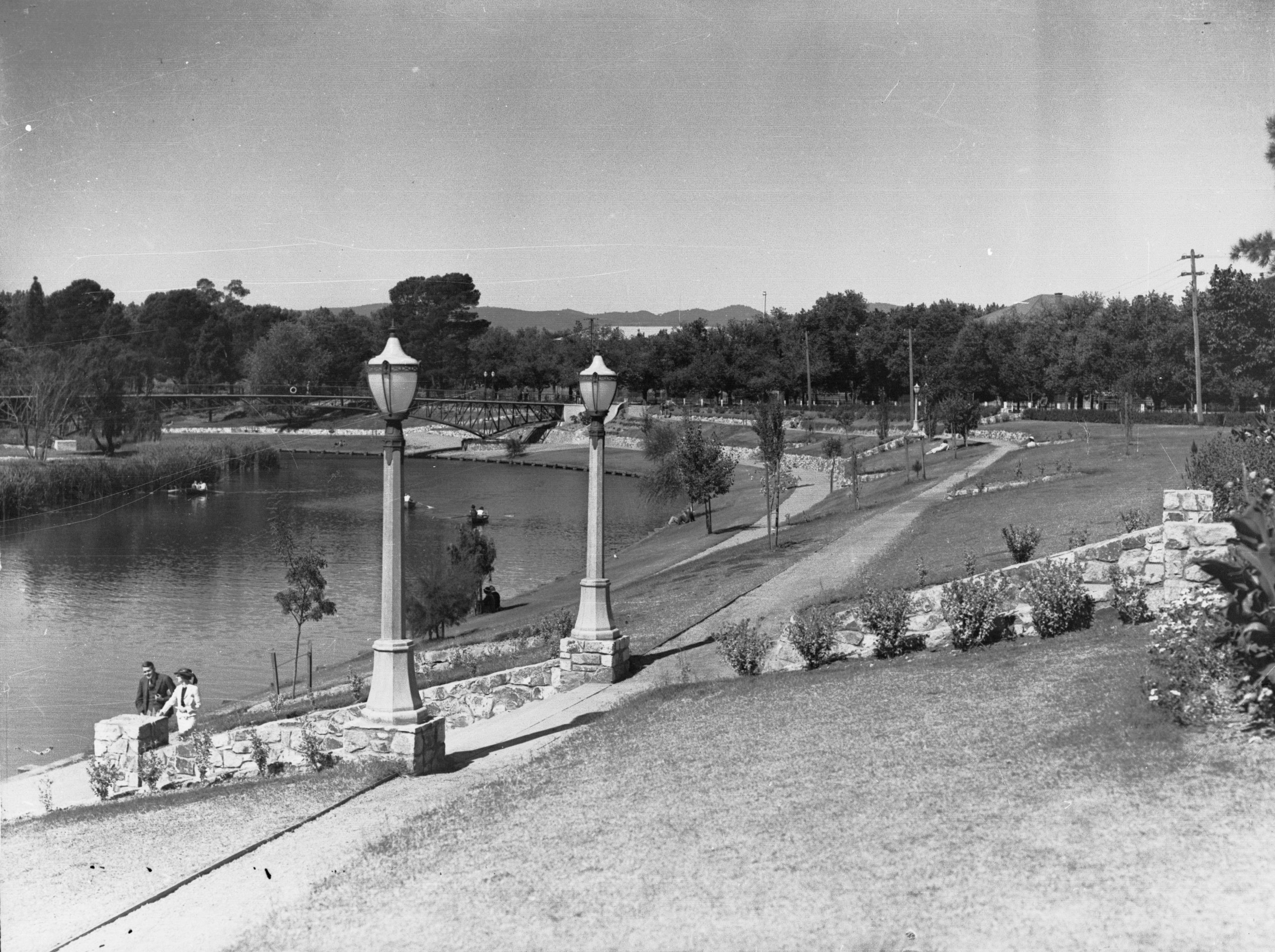
University Footbridge over the River Torrens

A cantilevered footbridge spans the River Torrens, opposite the main southern gateway of the University of Adelaide, erected in 1937. (Note: University Footbridge description in CLMP Karrawirra (Park 12), p. 17: Located in the River Torrens portion of the park, a dramatic cantilevered footbridge over the River Torrens of much picturesque charm and presence. Designed by South Australian Railways engineers John Adrian Farghar and Reginald Bridgland with drawings authorised by the railways' Chief Mechanical Engineer, Robert Hall Chapman. Construction of the footbridge proceeded with moneys from the Council as part of its commitment to the state's centenary celebrations, and with a gift of £2,000 from Misses E and L Waite. The footbridge was opened on 9 August 1937. Listed as a State heritage place.)

== Formal parks, gardens and paths ==
=== Pathway of Honour ===
Located between Kintore Avenue and King William Road, adjacent to the northern Government House grounds wall. Consists of a narrow sliver of land with a partially curved pedestrian pathway with associated war memorial plaques and stones. It was a pedestrian route that evolved in the 1920s and was formalised in the 1980s to honour those who were killed in war.

=== Town Clerk's Avenue / Walk ===
An axial pedestrian pathway from Sir Edwin Smith Avenue and Angas Gardens, leading to Frome Road, it was developed c.1917 with tree planting and pathway formation.

=== Angas Gardens ===
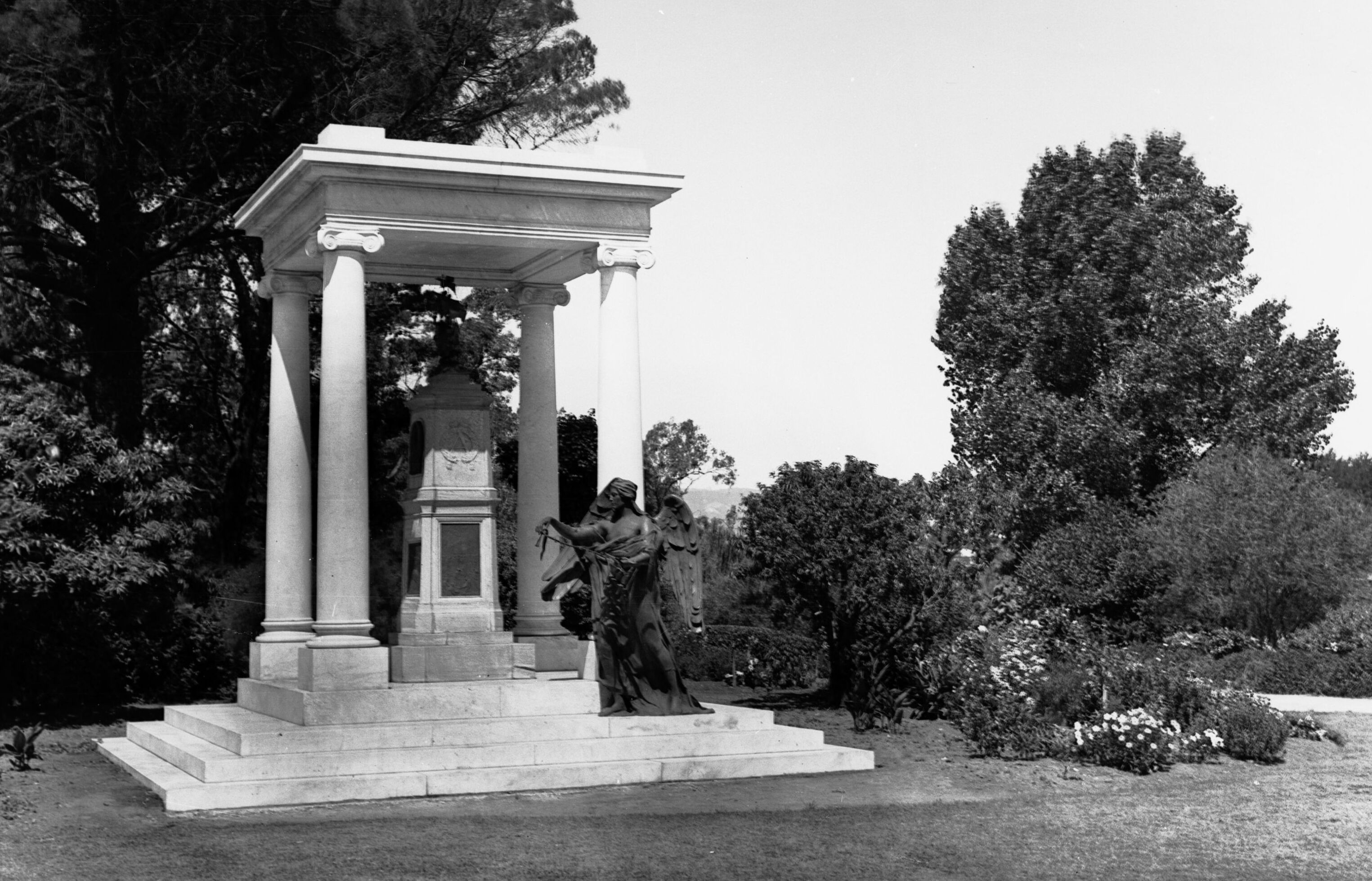
Angas Memorial in Angas Gardens, a tribute to the memory of the colonists George Fife Angas and John Howard Angas

Located east off King William Road between War Memorial Drive and the River Torrens, the gardens feature the JH & GF Angas Statue and Memorial by WR Cotton (1915), and Robert Hannaford's statue of Simpson and his donkey. The gardens are named after South Australian pioneers and pastoralists John Howard Angas and George Fife Angas.

=== Roberts Place ===
Located on the corner of Frome Road and Sir Edwin Smith Avenue, and an original extension of McKinnon Terrace. A triangular portion of land originally conceived as a formal garden centred upon a mature Moreton Bay Fig tree. Named after retired American merchant and South Australia Colonization Commissioner Josiah Roberts.

=== Grundy Gardens ===
Located between Frome and King William Roads and War Memorial and Victoria Drives.

=== Pennington Gardens East ===
Located between King William Road, Pennington Terrace and Sir Edwin Smith Avenue. A triangular shaped garden that was severely modified in 1919 onwards with the imposition of the Women's War Memorial Garden. Named after South Australian Colonisation Commissioner James Pennington.

==== Women's War Memorial Garden ====
Located within Pennington Gardens East, the Women's War Memorial was designed by Walter Torode in 1922. A formal rectangular configured "Cross of Sacrifice" Garden reminiscent of a cathedral floor plan, designed by architect Alfred Wells and garden by Sir Herbert Baker, includes the predominant use of low olive hedging, lavender and roses. The 11.6 metres (38 feet) high Cross of Sacrifice, designed by Sir Reginald Blomfield, at the north-west end is aligned to face the facade of St Peter's Cathedral. As a tribute, a scroll with the names of Adelaide's lost is enclosed within the base of the cross. The Remembrance Stone, designed by Sir Edwin Lutyens, is at the south-eastern end. The cross was unveiled and the garden opened on 25 April 1922. The stone was unveiled on 25 April 1923. The Adelaide Anzac Day Commemorative March ends at the memorial. The garden is listed as a State heritage place.

=== Pioneer Women's Memorial Garden ===
Located in the Torrens Parade Ground portion between the Ground and the northern Government House grounds wall. A place identified and proposed in 1937 by the Women's Council of South Australia as a venue to honour the pioneer women of South Australia, under a Committee chaired by Adelaide Miethke. Waikerie limestone statue sculptured by Olna Cohn and garden designed, planted and constructed by landscape designer Elsie Cornish in 1938. Statue unveiled 19 April 1941. Garden renovated by the Council in 2002. The garden possesses associative significance to the foundation of the Royal Flying Doctor Service in Alice Springs. Listed as a State heritage place.

=== Heritage Rose Garden ===
Developed in 1995–1996 and re-developed in 2017-2018 for the WFR conference in 2021. Located on the north bank of the River Torrens, the garden was designed by the Adelaide Group of Heritage Roses in Australia.

=== Prince Henry Gardens ===
This narrow strip separates North Terrace from the institutions to the North running from Kintore Avenue to Frome Road. In 1934 was renamed by the Adelaide City Council from North Terrace Gardens, to honour Prince Henry.

== See also ==
- List of Adelaide parks and gardens

== Bibliography ==
"Community Land Management Plan for Karrawirra (Park 12)" (PDF). Adelaide: Adelaide City Council. 2006. Archived from the original (PDF) on 19 November 2010.
