= Pioneer Women's Memorial Garden (Adelaide) =

Garden in Adelaide, South Australia

Coordinates: 34.9185°S 138.6004°E

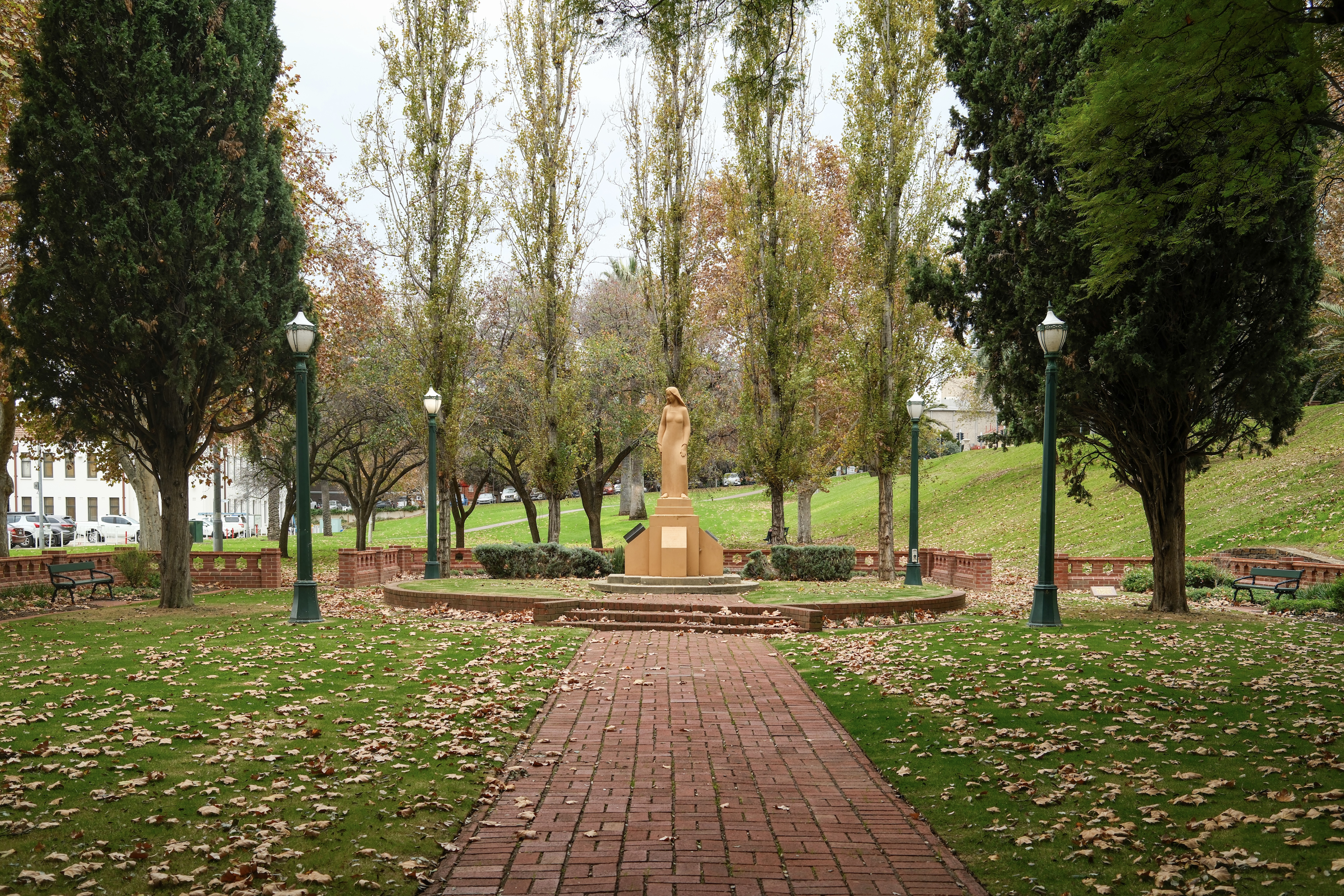
Pioneer Women's Memorial Garden in 2026

The Pioneer Women's Memorial Garden in Park 12 of the Park Lands of Adelaide, South Australia, is a tribute to the pioneer women of South Australia. The garden was designed by landscape designer Elsie Cornish (1887–1946), and the statue created by Ola Cohn was unveiled by Lady Muriel Barclay-Harvey (the wife of the Governor of South Australia, Sir Malcolm Barclay-Harvey) on 19 April 1941.

The main entrance is located off King William Road opposite the Adelaide Festival Centre, between the Torrens Parade Ground on the north side and the rear of Government House on the south. The shady garden and surrounding lawned areas are used for quiet recreation throughout the year, and for a week each March becomes a hive of activity when the Adelaide Festival presents the Adelaide Writers' Week there.

== History ==
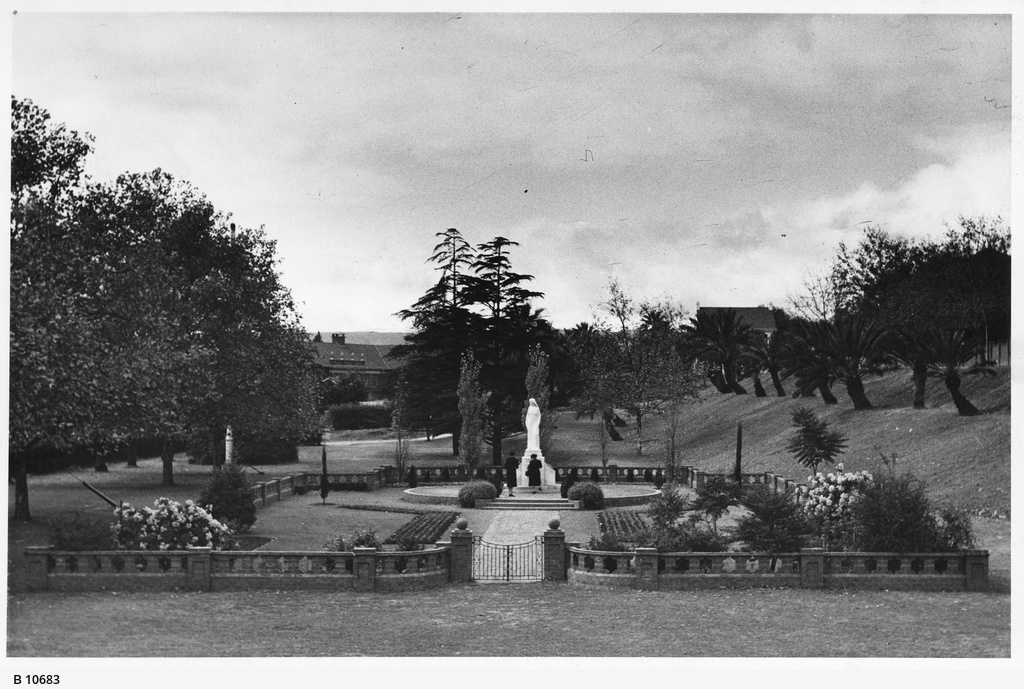
Pioneer Women's Memorial Garden in 1941

The garden was proposed in May 1938 by the Pioneer Women's Memorial Trust of South Australia. Two representatives of this organisation, Miss Phebe Watson and Chair of the Trust Adelaide Miethke, approached the City of Adelaide's Town Clerk, W. C. D. Veale, to create a 'garden of memory'. It is claimed that the garden was modelled on the Pioneer Women's Memorial Garden in Melbourne, which had been opened in 1935.

In the proposal Watson wrote: "With the approval of and consent of the Adelaide City Council, we desire to lay down a formal garden, with a sundial and figure as its central unit (to denote the passing of time) within the base of which will be placed a casket containing the records of the first centenary celebration. Our proposal is for a garden approximately 120 feet [36.5 m] by 80 feet [24 m], surrounded by a dwarfbrick wall, with long central pathway of brick leading up three short steps to the sundial ... Garden beds are provided as in the accompanying sketch, shrubs and ornamental trees as jacaranda and flame tree, against a background of golden poplars ... Miss Elsie Cornish is our adviser, and the sketch submitted is, of course, capable of modification."

The area behind Government House in Adelaide was proposed, with site and garden proposals being taken up in 1938.

Cornish and the Trust argued with the Adelaide City Council over design issues through to late 1939 with Trust Chair Miethke writing to the Council in support of Cornish during this time. The garden was eventually developed to Cornish's design, with her planting the original species and herself erecting the low brick wall.

== Design ==
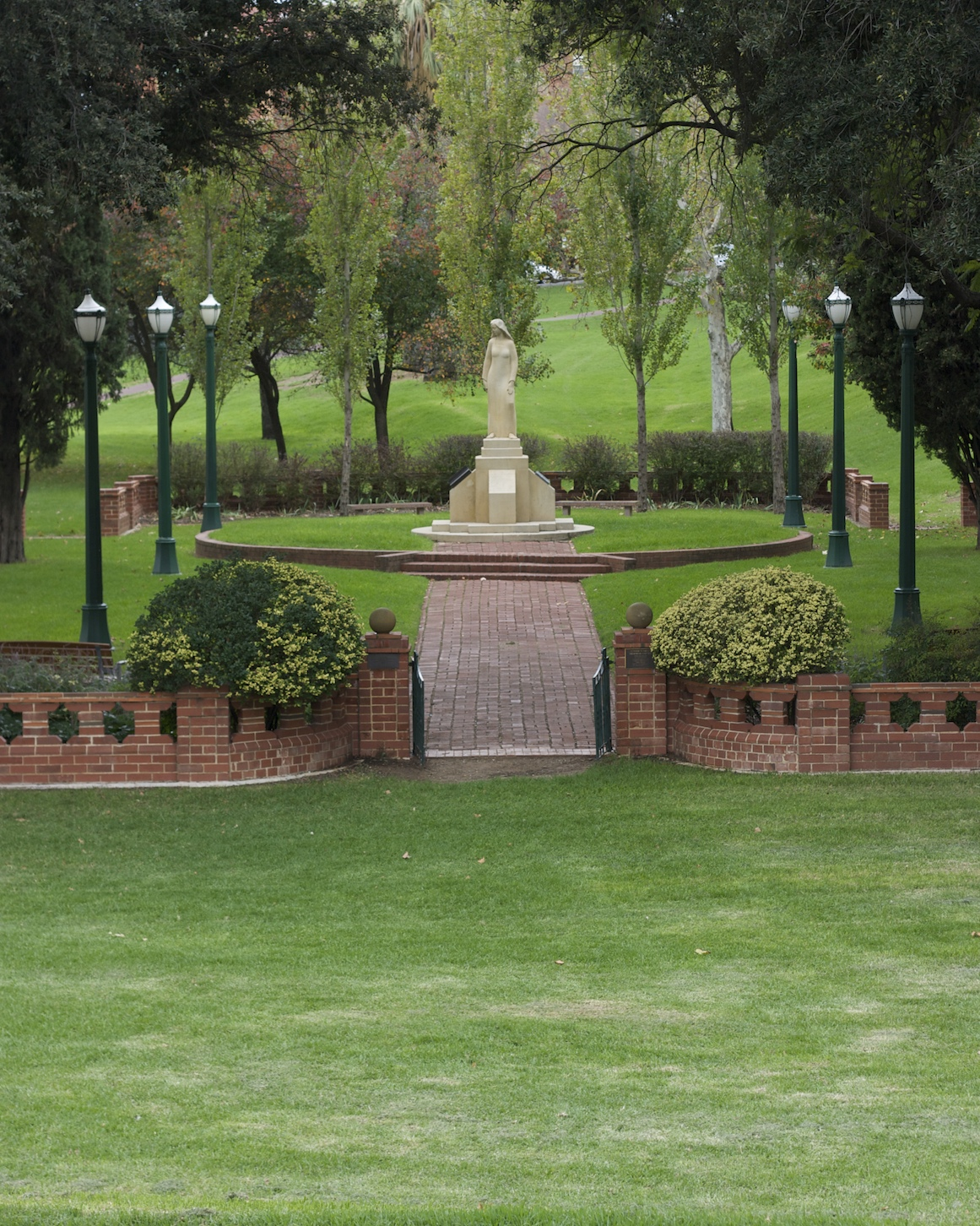
The gardens in 2010

The design of the garden is a simple rectangle with a low decorative brick wall. At the centre of the garden is Cohn's sculpture of a female figure, raised on a plinth. This is surrounded by green lawns, and four garden beds with ornamental trees and shrubs at the edges.

Cornish's choice of plants was influenced by their symbolic meanings, selecting five Populus nigra "Italica" (Lombardy poplars) to represent the five women of the Pioneer Women's Memorial Trust; Quercus ilex (holly oak) and Myrtus communis (myrtle) for protection and love; Lonicera (honeysuckle) for love, generosity and devotion; and Syringa vulgaris (lilac) to symbolize memory, protection, youth and tenderness. Here the designer carefully selected plants for their metaphorical meanings.

Original plans for the garden included the use of a 'floral clock', that would represent the passage of time; however this idea was rejected on the grounds that it would require too much maintenance.

== Pioneer Women ==
Four park benches face the garden from the west, commemorating the following women:

Carol Rowntree 20.07.55 - 15.09.02 "Passionate about People, Books and Justice"

Elizabeth Webb Nicholls 21.02.1850 - 03.08.1943 "Suffragette, social reformer, and for many years the leader of the Woman's Christian Temperance Union of South Australia and Australia"

Colonel Sybil Irving, M.B.E. "Controller A.W.A.S. 1941-1946" "Honorary Colonel, W.R.A.A.C. 1956-1961"

Catherine Jean Cleave 09.02.1980 - 27.08.1998 "A caring and joyful spirit who made a difference"

A large memorial also stands on the rise by King William Street, by the path beginning the war memorial walk between King William Street and Kintore Avenue. This reads: "Unveiled by Trish Worth, Federal Member for Adelaide on 20.04.97 on behalf of the Council of United ex-Servicewomen (SA) Inc. and Council President Coral E. Farrelly OAM. Artist: Janette Moore in association with Margaret Worth."

== Uses and events ==
Aside from its use as a general recreational space and quiet retreat from the city at lunchtimes, the Adelaide Writers' Week is held at the Gardens annually in March.

== See also ==
- List of Adelaide parks and gardens
