= Mucke =

Mucke or Mücke or Muecke is a German surname of multiple origins. Notable people with the surname include:

- Elli Mücke (born 1981), German singer
- Ernst Mucke (Sorbian Arnošt Muka; 1854–1932), Sorbian scholar and writer
- Hermann Mucke (bioscientist) (born 1955), Austrian bioscientist and consultant
- Hermann Mucke (astronomer) (1935–2019), Austrian astronomer and public educator
- Manuela Mucke (born 1975), German sprint canoer
- Stefan Mücke (born 1981), German racing driver
- Carl Muecke (editor) (1815–1898), German-born clergyman, scientist, and newspaperman in South Australia
- Charles Andrew Muecke (1918–2007), US federal judge
- Hugo Carl Emil Muecke (1842–1929), Australian politician, son of Carl

- Ada Crossley was Ada Crossley Muecke, having married H. C. E. Muecke's son Francis

- Jonathan Muecke (born 1983), American architect
- Stephen Muecke (born 1951), Australian linguist
- Tom Muecke (1963–2016), American football player
- Hellmuth von Mücke (1881–1957), officer of the Kaiserliche Marine
