= Minna Fischer =

Australian lyric soprano and singing teacher

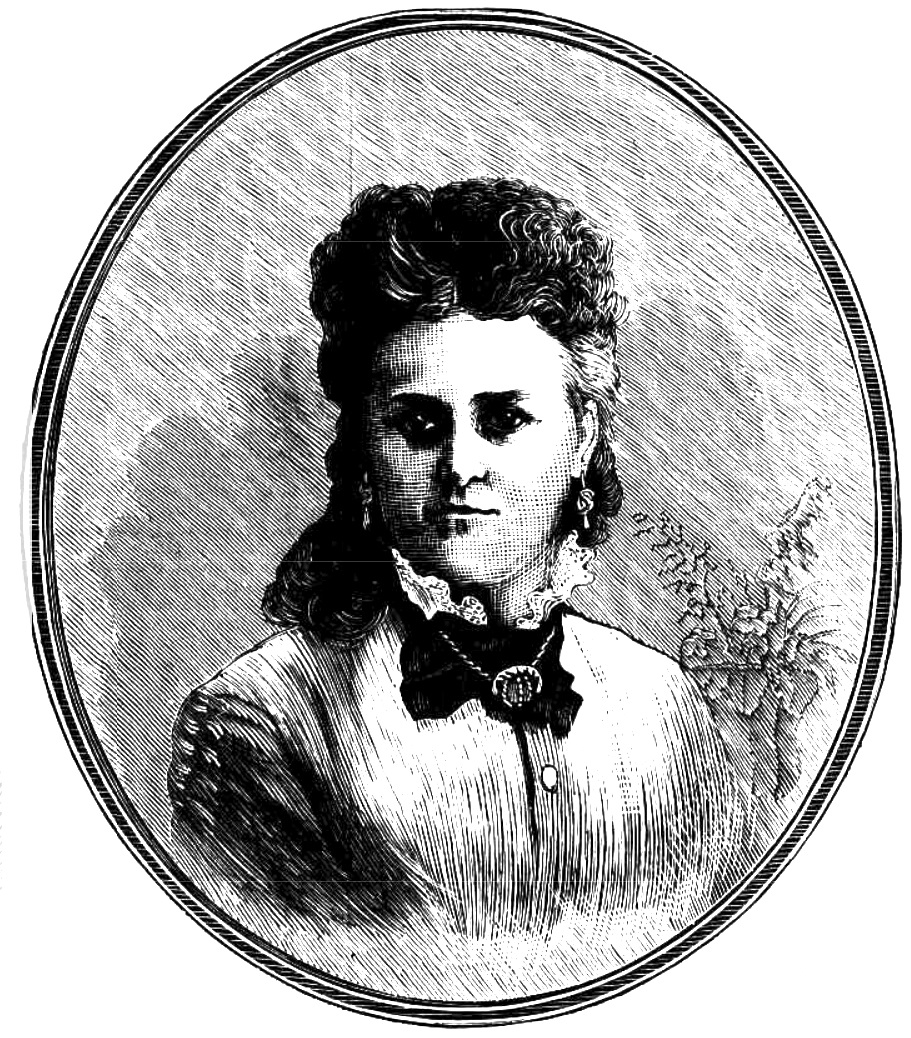

Background information
- Born: 20 January 1858; Tanunda, South Australia
- Died: 7 August 1941 (aged 83)
- Instrument: soprano

Minna Pauline (Note: Often written "Paulina", the German pronunciation of this name.) Fischer (20 January 1858 – 7 August 1941) was an Australian lyric soprano and singing teacher in London.

== History ==
Fischer was born in Tanunda, South Australia, the second daughter of George Friedrich Fischer and his second wife Emma Caroline Antoinette Fischer, née Sobels (married 5 April 1855).

George emigrated to South Australia aboard the ship Louise, arriving 26 March 1849, and was soon involved in the city's musical scene, performing with Frederick and Albert Seyler, who arrived aboard Alfred in December 1848. George was co-owner with Robert Wiener (died 1878) of a Rundle Street coffee house, birthplace of the Adelaide Liedertafel, then licensees of the Tanunda Hotel from 1862 to 1870. He ran the National Hotel, Adelaide in Pirie Street 1871–72, the Hamburg (later Oriental) on the Gawler Place/Rundle Street corner 1872–73, and the Pier, Glenelg 1873–74, when he was found guilty of trading while insolvent, and left for Melbourne. He was an accomplished pianist and singer, often heard in duets with Wiener. He died at Hobsons Bay railway station after tripping and fracturing his skull.

Emma emigrated with her parents, winemaker Carl August Sobels and Johanna Wilhelmine Sobels, née Diemann, six brothers and a sister aboard Hermann von Beckerath from Bremen in December 1847.

Minna received early training from Moritz Heuzenroeder and Fred Ellard of Adelaide and Lucy Chambers of Melbourne. At age 16 she joined the Italian Opera Company, which toured New Zealand and Australia and undertaking further study in Germany, she performed concerts in London and elsewhere.

In 1877 she was a member of Mme Simonsen's opera company touring Wallace's opera Maritana as "Wanda", Charles Lecocq's La fille de Madame Angot in the dual roles of "Babet" and "Herailie", Carlo Broschi (Baildon's (Note: Not to be confused with Arthur Bayldon, Arthur Baildon, of Newcastle, England made several translations for the Simonsen company, another being Bellini's I Capuleti e i Montecchi) adaptation of Auber's La part du diable) as "Casilda", Lecoq's Giroflé-Girofla as "Pedro", Bellini's La Sonnambula as "Lisa", Flotow's Martha, Harris's Satanella, The Hermit's Bell (Baildon's translation from Maillart's Les dragons de Villars), as "Georgette", all supporting roles, but to glowing reviews.

Fischer left Simonsen's company, then in December 1877 she and Maggie Liddle joined Emily Soldene's English Comic Opera Company who were about to tour New Zealand with Giroflé-Girofla, Rose Stella and Cissy Durant having left the troupe at the last minute. Fischer took the role of "Pedro". On their return to Sydney, Stella and Durant were rehired. Fisher joined the Melbourne Academy of Music troupe playing the pantomime Robinson Crusoe at the Bijou Theatre to packed houses. Fischer joined the Soldene company after its return from New Zealand, playing "Paquita" in Giroflé-Girofla at the opening of Adelaide's new Theatre Royal. followed by Jacques Offenbach's Madame l'archiduc as the Countess. At their farewell season in Melbourne she played "Philibert" in Geneviève de Brabant, also by Offenbach; "Clairette" in La fille de Madame Angot, "Foedora" in Hervé's Poulet et Poulette, Offenbach's La perichole, "Anna" in Weber's Der Freischütz. On 30 June 1878 Miss Soldene and company sailed by the Chimborazo for England.

The Opera House came under the management of G. B. W. Lewis in July 1878, and Fischer was in the cast of the first production, Oxygen by Farnie and Reece. She was well received in several burlesques at the Adelaide Theatre Royal, but apart from an appearance at the Liedertafel made few further performances in 1878. On 28 May 1879 she married the celebrated Australian actor Herbert Flemming in Melbourne and had two sons before they had a major disagreement and separated.

In 1888 she joined the Amy Sherwin concert company touring New Zealand, and followed Sherwin to London, performing regularly on the concert stage, and with her two sons staying with Sherwin for at least some of the time.

She quit the stage around 1904, and as Madame Minna Fischer taught voice production in the St John's Wood district, London. She was involved in Ada Crossley's wedding to Dr F. Muecke, son of H. C. E. Muecke, directing the choir which comprised Evangeline Florence, Mary Conly, Nora Long, Elsie Jones, Eva Mylott, Meta Buring, May Otto, Ivy Ansley and May Putney. The hymn "O Perfect Love" was arranged by George H. Clutsam, a well-known pianist and composer.

Flemming died in 1908 and two months later, on 12 December 1908, Fischer married Clutsam. They had shared the stage in Sydney at Sherwin's 1888 farewell concert series, the extensive concert tour which followed, then in London, when Fischer, Sherwin and Clutsam frequently appeared together.

Apart from her other vocal qualities, Fischer was known for her command of the German language.

== Students ==
Fischer's pupils include:

- Irene Ainslie of New Zealand
- Meta Buring
- Amy Castles
- her niece Elsa Fischer (died 1945), daughter of Hugo Fischer, professional name Elsa Stralia.
- Nora Long of Dunedin, New Zealand
- Eva Mylott, of Moruya, New South Wales
- Minnie Rayner of Perth, Western Australia, not to be confused with Minnie Rayner (1869–1941), the English actress.
- Elsie Rosslyn, singing teacher of Perth, Western Australia

She has one of several teachers of Ada Crossley, who headed a list of students, Misses Owen Chaplin, Cassie Crang, Grace Dalton, Maud Hatzfield, Annie Horrocks, Marion Tack, Tessie Kelly, Nora Long, Dorothea Loring, Beatrice Miranda, Jessie Neil, Minnie Rayner, Jessie Redpath, Enid Sass, and Fanny Wood who made Fischer the much-appreciated gift of an enamel-faced clock.

== Family ==
Minna Pauline Fischer married the actor Herbert Flemming (1856 – 23 October 1908) in Melbourne on 28 May 1879. They had two sons before their amicable separation:

- Leonard Denman Flemming (29 April 1880 – 1946) married Wilma Berkeley c. October 1929 in London. Born in Adelaide, he settled in South Africa at age 15, became a farmer and author of Call of the Veldt (filmed in 1929), Fool of the Veldt, New Story of an African Farm and Fun of the Veldt. A Bard in the Backveld : Verse and Worse (1943); The Curious Continent and Other Stories (1941). She was an Australian singer in musical comedy, a protege of Dame Nellie Melba.
- Herbert Flemming (c. 1881 – 7 May 1915). As Captain Flemming of the 9th Bn. London Regiment (Queen Victoria's Rifles), he died from wounds received during the war of 1914–1918. Cited by some as Flemming's eldest son, however his headstone gives his age as 33 years.

She married again, to George Howard Clutsam in London on 12 December 1908.

Her sister Johanne Elisabeth Fischer (13 February 1856 – 17 July 1929), born in Tanunda, married Robert Homburg "Judge Homburg" (10 March 1848 – 23 March 1912) in Adelaide on 16 October 1882.

Her brother Otto Fischer (2 May 1862 – 14 January 1934), later known as Otto Fischer Sobell, born in Tanunda, was a bass-baritone noted for Wagnerian roles; was in 1883 first recipient of the Elder Scholarship. He married Mabel Burrows in Adelaide on 10 July 1889. They divorced in 1891. He married again, to Agatha Scheper in Frankfurt, on 5 April 1893. He married once more, to Viola (often Violet) Agnew in London, on 28 June 1913. They arrived in Sydney aboard Media in April 1915 as "Frank Sobell", with wife and son. He died at South Yarra, Victoria.

- Jack Fischer (4 May 1890 – )
- James Otto Sobell (6 April 1914 – ) known as a linguist
- George Hamish Sobell (20 January 1917 – )
