= Hermann Mucke =

Hermann Mucke may refer to:

- Hermann Mucke (bioscientist) (born 1955), Austrian bioscientist
- Hermann Mucke (astronomer) (1935–2019), Austrian astronomer
