= The Children's Hour (Australian magazine) =

The Children's Hour was a periodical of 16 pages produced by the Education Department of South Australia for distribution in the State's primary schools, first published in 1889. Oliver David Jones (died 1933) was principal contributor and editor from March 1892 to April 1912. The magazine was started at the instigation of John Anderson Hartley (died 1896), South Australian Inspector-General of Education, and price per copy was one halfpence, soon increased to one penny ("still cheaper than an English import"). Assistant Inspector-General Charles Lawrence Whitham (died 1908) was the first editor of the magazine, which was generally well received.

The magazine was intended for supplementary reading and recreation, supplying impeccably-written up-to-date information on current events appropriate to schoolchildren, with an emphasis on patriotism and good citizenship, as well as stories, plays and poems, often introducing unfamiliar words to extend the child's vocabulary. Also included were a pot-pourri of jokes, puzzles and anecdotes of an "improving" nature. The editor was the source of most material and inclusion of contributions by schoolchildren was exceedingly rare. A reproduction of a famous painting was usually printed on the cover, otherwise it contained no illustrations. Aquila Monk (1851–1914), headmaster of the Goolwa school, provided chess problems.

Bertie S. Roach (died 1944), lecturer in history and literature and headmaster at Walkerville school and much else, also served as editor from 1906 to 1915, when he was appointed Inspector of Schools.

Phebe Watson was editor from 1931. When Adelaide Miethke retired as Inspector of Girls' Schools in June 1941, she took up editorship the following month.

In the 1950s a braille version of The Children's Hour was made available to blind children at Townsend House slightly ahead of the printed version to other schools.
