= John Henry Richman =

John Henry Richman (1791 – 21 January 1864) was a lawyer in the young British colony of South Australia.

Richman, his wife Frances (née Hampton) and children Henry John, Sophia, and Frances arrived in South Australia in February 1839 on the Thomas Harrison.

He was Clerk to the Magistrates Bench from 1843, and in February 1846 qualified as a lawyer. From around 1853 to 1856 he had a partnership with W. R. Wigley (c. 1826–1890) as Richman & Wigley, solicitors, with offices in Clark's buildings, Hindley Street, then White's Chambers, King William Street.

He was one of the Justices of the Peace appointed in the revised list of 1862.

He owned Icalla Icalla station (also called Italli Italli) near Quorn. and "Warnbunga", Watervale, where he lived from 1861 or earlier, and where he died in 1864.

== Family ==
John Henry Richman (1791–1864) married Frances Hampton (1807–1865) on 11 Jul 1823. Their children included:

- Henry John Richman (January 1825 – 2 August 1902) married Mary Nagle (c. 1830 – 20 December 1900). He ran Mount Brown station near Quorn and the Old Lincoln Gap run near Port Augusta, later Pernatty and McDouall Peak stations, further north. Later blind, he died of dropsy at his home on East Terrace, Adelaide.

- Frances Alice Richman (1855 – 2 October 1931) married Capt. (later Colonel) (Arthur Scrocold) Wade Gregory ( – ) on 4 July 1885. She contested implementation of her father's Will.
- Alice Frances Richman (13 November 1856 – 14 January 1882) companion of her aunt Lady Olive Fergusson; died of cholera in India
- Edward Richman (12 December 1858 – 30 April 1931) married the widow Lillian Maud Johnstone, née Martin, ( –1943) in 1926; they had no children. He was Captain of the 5th Imperial Bushmen's Corps in the Boer War, and managed his father's Clare properties.

- Sophia Richman ( – June 1885) married Sir Walter Watson Hughes (22 August 1803 – 1 January 1887) in 1841. They had no children.
- Frances Richman ( – 12 August 1906) married Gavin D(avid) Young ( – 26 February 1881) on 24 October 1861, residence "Arthur Seat", Mount Lofty

- George James Young ( – 17 April 1926) married Margaret Ower Ritchie ( – ) on 14 December 1888. Margaret was a daughter of the Hon. Charles Thomson Ritchie PC.
- Jessie Frances Young ( – 5 July 1924) married Alec Raven ( – ) on 4 August 1888.

- Emily Mason Richman (c. 1839 – 18 November 1896) married George Cornelius Gooch (1836–) on 1 September 1858
- James McKinnon Richman (c. 1842 – 23 June 1925), managed and inherited or was given by his uncle Walter Watson Hughes, property at Watervale, South Australia known as Springvale estate, which Hughes developed as a vineyard, leased by C. A. Sobels to make Spring Vale wines. After the death of Hughes in 1877, Sobels and Hermann Büring purchased the property, later known as Quelltaler. J. M. Richman was a longtime generous supporter of a wide range of worthy charities.
- Olive Richman (c. 1843 – 8 January 1882) married James Fergusson (later Sir James Fergusson, Bart., KCMG 1832–1907) on 11 March 1873.

- They had one son, Alan Walter John Fergusson (16 August 1878 – 6 August 1909). Sir James had another two sons by a previous marriage. Lady Olive died of cholera at Marbleshwar, the Governor's summer residence in Bombay (today's Mumbai), where Sir James was Governor. She was accompanied by her niece Alice Frances Richman, who died from the same disease two days after the funeral. Alan and his wife died in a boating accident.
