= Tintara =

Winery in McLaren Vale, South Australia

Coordinates: 35°12′44″S 138°32′17″E

Tintara is an Australian winery located in McLaren Vale, South Australia within the McLaren Vale wine region. The winery was established in 1861 and incorporated in the 1862 as the Tintara Vineyard Company by Alexander Kelly, a medical physician and winemaker who wrote the early Australian winemaking and viticultural text Winegrowing in Australia and The Vine in Australia. Several prominent figures in the early history of South Australia and McLaren Vale were initial investors in the winery including the founder of the University of Adelaide, Walter Watson Hughes, landowner Samuel Davenport and politician Thomas Elder. Today the winery holds the distinction of producing the oldest surviving bottle of Australian wine—an 1867 Tintara Vineyard claret. The Tintara wine earned the distinction when the previous record holder, an 1864 bottle of Pewsey Vale Cabernet Sauvignon, was accidentally broken by an office cleaner at Christie's auction house.

== History ==
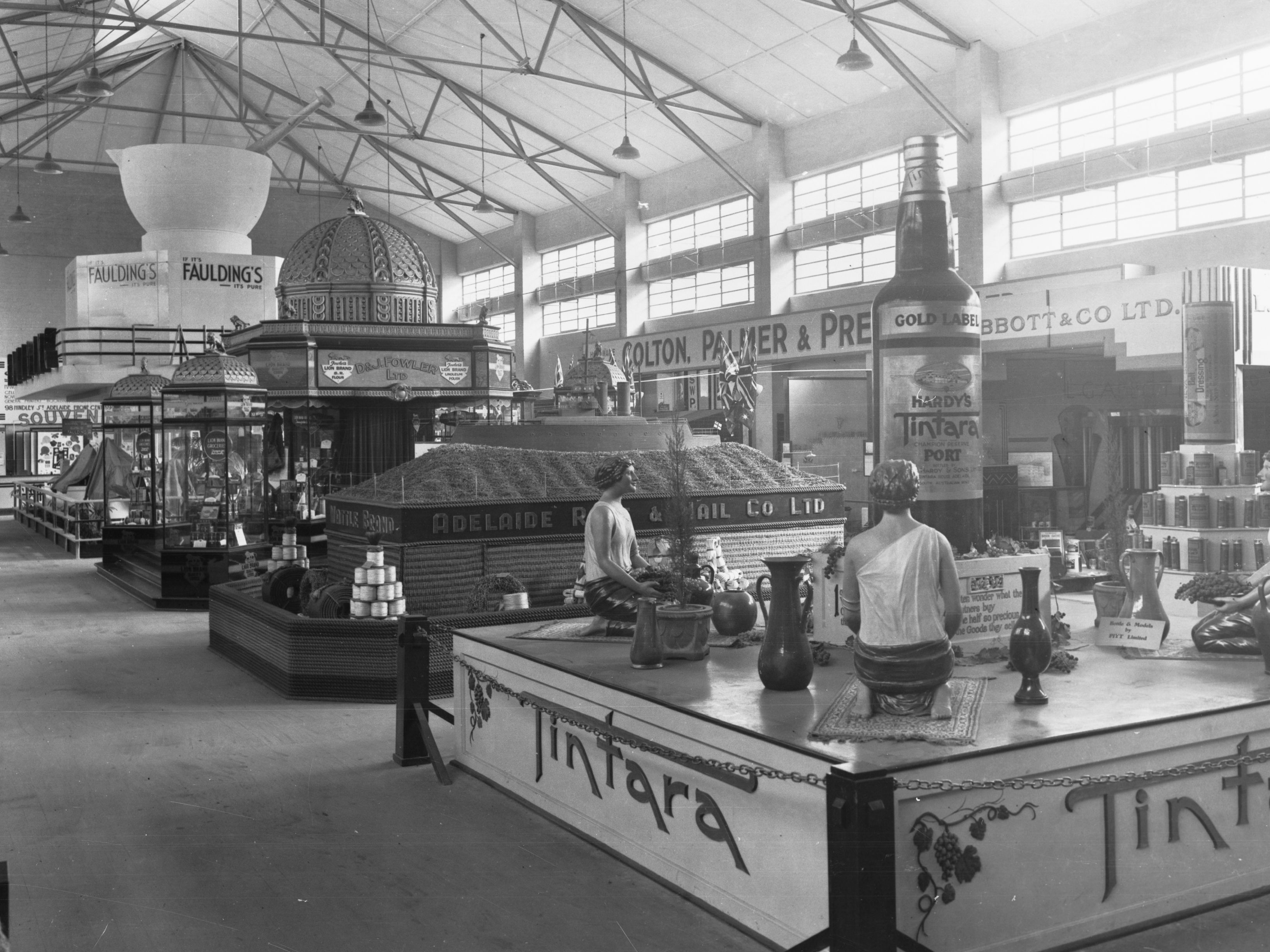
Centenary Exhibition at Centennial Hall in Wayville showing food produce, ca. 1936

Dr. Alexander Charles Kelly, MD LRCS (5 June 1811 – 9 October 1877) was born in Dunbar, Scotland and qualified at Edinburgh in 1832. He emigrated to South Australia aboard Baboo, arriving in March 1840. In May 1841 he was appointed to the Adelaide Hospital as honorary medical officer, then in 1846 was sent to London to lecture on emigration to the Colony, returning aboard Lady Macnaghten in October 1847 and settled at Morphett Vale.

Being intrigued at the potential for grape growing in the McLaren Vale, he planted in 1845 the first vines in the area, naming the vineyard "Trinity". His medical practice now took a distant second place to his interest in viticulture and oenology. In 1854 he married Annie Frances Worthington; their son John George Kelly (1859–1947) would become a noted winemaker.

In 1861 Kelly's book The Vine in Australia went on sale. That same year he established Tintara winery, one of the first commercial wineries in the McLaren Vale area, and in 1862 founded Tintara Vineyard Company with prominent South Australian investors Thomas Elder, Samuel Davenport and Walter Hughes. The initial planting included 210 acres (85 hectares) and was followed with a second wave of plantings in 1864. Among the grape varieties planted were Mataro (Mourvèdre), Shiraz, Grenache and Carignan. In 1863 he sold "Trinity" to concentrate on the Tintara business. Around 1871 Kelly entered into a three-year contract with P. B. Burgoyne, later extended another year, to take on the business of importing and bottling Tintara wines for the British market, working from offices and cellars at 50 Old Broad Street.

Around August 1877 Thomas Hardy purchased the property and 27,000 imperial gallons (120 kl) of wine from Kelly. He also purchased a nearby flour mill, with the intention of adapting it for wine production. Around 1888 Thomas Hardy's company became Thomas Hardy & Sons (later Hardy Wine Company, now part of the Accolade Wines portfolio).

== Oldest surviving bottle of Australian wine ==
Tintara Winery is currently the producer of the oldest surviving bottle of Australia wine. The bottle, a Bordeaux style blend labeled as a claret, dates back to the 1867 vintage. Its existence was previously unknown until it resurfaced in the 1970s. In 1977, the wine was sold to a private collector by Sotheby's auction house. In 2003 the Hardy Wine Company, owners of Tintara Winery and now in the Accolade Wines portfolio, purchased the bottle for an undisclosed five-figure sum.

It became the oldest bottle of Australian wine following the accidental destruction of the previous record holder, an 1864 bottle of Cabernet Sauvignon from Pewsey Vale. That bottle was owned by winemaker and collector Len Evans who purchased the wine in the 1970s. Evans left the wine in care of then Christie's senior director of wine, Michael Broadbent, for safe keeping. While at Christie's in Broadbent's office, an office cleaner accidentally knocked over the bottle while dusting, causing it to fall and break on the floor.

== Modern wine production ==
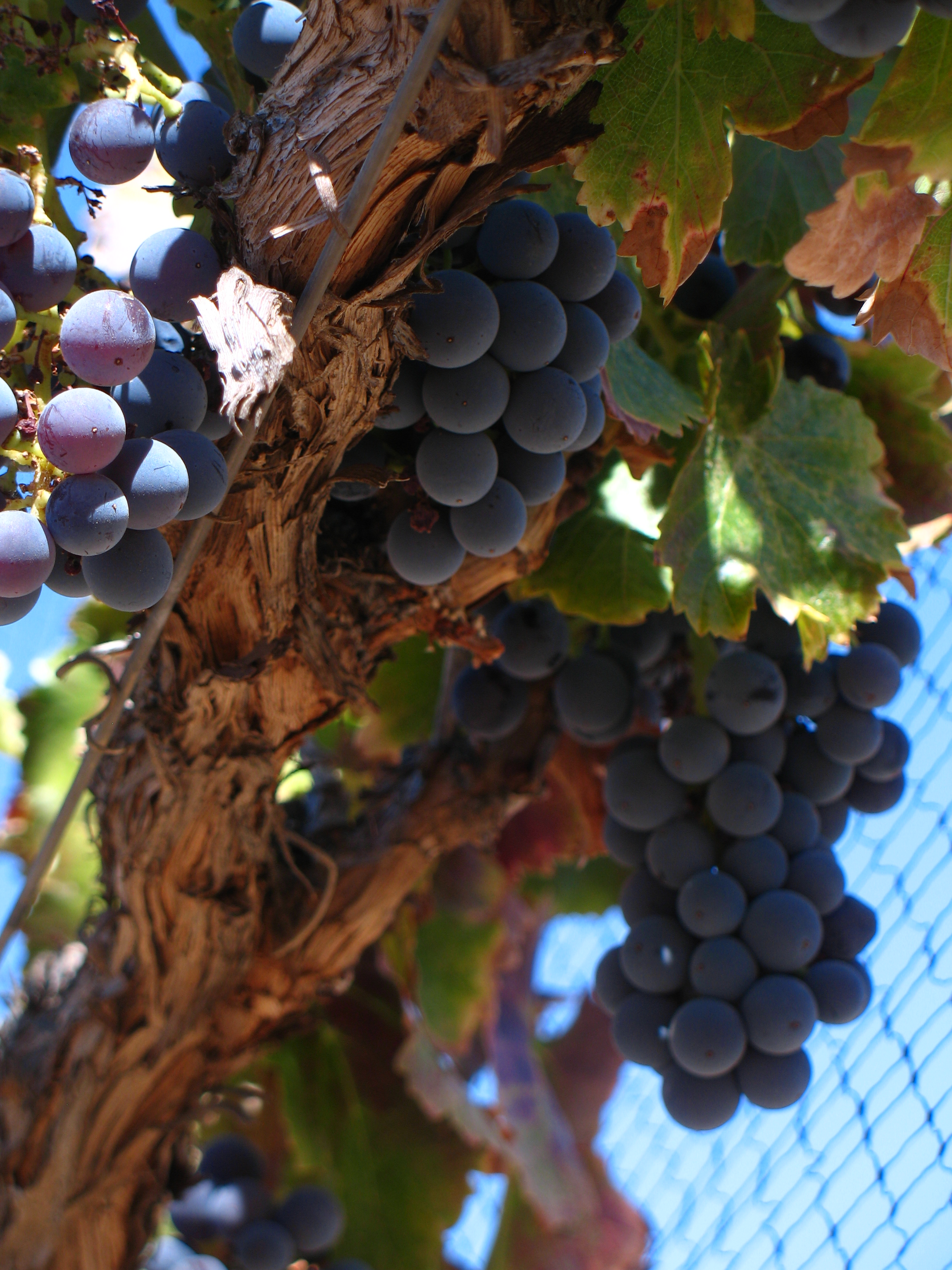
Grenache is among the grape varieties that Tintara continues to produce wine from.

Today, Tintara Winery is a brand in the Accolade Wines portfolio. The winery is located in the McLaren Vale wine region with the vineyard influenced by the climate and geography of the nearby Gulf St Vincent and Mount Lofty Ranges. Among the wines currently produced by Tintara are varietal bottlings of Shiraz, Grenache and Cabernet Sauvignon as well as blended wines.

== See also ==
- Australian wine
- Cult wine
- South Australian wine
- List of wineries in the Barossa Valley
