= Amy Tomkinson =

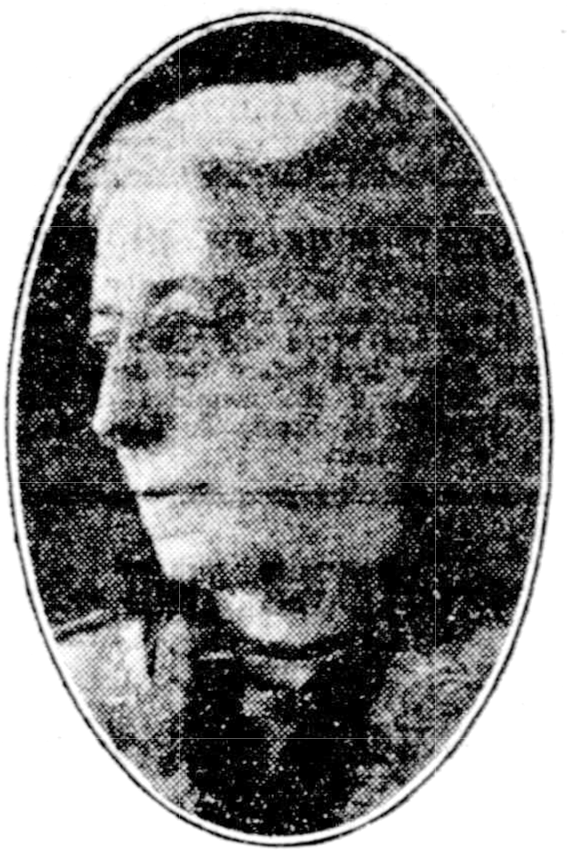
Amy Tomkinson in 1928

Amy Louisa Tomkinson JP (3 June 1856 – 17 November 1943) was a magistrate in South Australia.

== History ==
Tomkinson was born in Adelaide, the eldest daughter of banker and later politician Samuel Tomkinson (3 June 1856 – 17 November 1943) and Louisa Charlotte Tomkinson, née Macdermott, (died 5 January 1910) who married in 1853.

She studied freehand and model drawing, as well as needlework at the Adelaide School of Design (1886–1888). She won a prize at the 1907 Exhibition of Women's Work in Adelaide for artistic bookbinding.

The first Australian, she spent three years at the London School of Economics as an independent scholar. As well as living in London, Tomkinson visited France, Germany, Sweden and Italy. She returned to Adelaide in 1900.

She wrote to the SA Council of Agriculture in 1903 requesting that agricultural courses, such as in dairying, fruit growing and horticulture be made available for women and stating that such training would make the women "a valuable economic asset to the state".

In 1911, Tomkinson was the only woman to be appointed by the SA treasurer, Crawford Vaughan, to serve on an advisory board with the remit to visit and assess the "beauty spots" of South Australia. Separately, she understood the importance of establishing playgrounds for children, where they would be allowed to romp and play.

In 1916, Tomkinson stood for councillor for the Gawler Ward at the Municipality of Adelaide elections. Although unsuccessful, she and fellow members of the Women's Non-Party Association were not unhappy with the results.

She was appointed JP in 1917, the second tranche of appointments to include women, and in the early days mostly sat on the bench in the Police and Children's Courts. In those days, when there was only a dozen women JPs, they formed themselves into an informal group, led by E. W. Nicholls, that met at the office of the Woman's Christian Temperance Union. Subsequently the Justices' Association was formed, which incorporated a Round Table section, of which Judge S. J. Mitchell was a guiding light, for discussing their challenges and responsibilities. In later years she sat in the Adoption Court, providing for the legal adoption of children.

She was active with Travellers' Aid Society, Kindergarten Union, Mothers' and Babies' Health Association, and with Catherine Helen Spence and Vida Goldstein a founder of Women's Non-Party Association.

She was an office-holder with the Workers' Educational Association, Aborigines Protection League, and Adelaide Women's Club. She was a founding member of the School for Mothers - later Mothers and Babies' Health Association. She was a proponent of playgrounds for children and greenspace for unstructured play and relaxation. She was librarian for the South Australian branch of the League of Nations Union.

== Family ==
Tomkinson never married, nor did her three younger sisters: Edith Caroline Tomkinson (1858–1954), whose 1878 diary was published by Mary de Crespigny as The Adelaide Establishment, Mary Harriet Tomlinson (1863–1943) and Elizabeth Maude Hamley (known as Maude) Tomlinson (1869–1943). They lived at "Mangona", later known as "St Barberie" (the home of Sir Trent and Lady de Crespigny), one of the stately homes of Mount Lofty, and in later years at "Frome House", a mansion on North Terrace, a few blocks from their favorite haunt, the Queen Adelaide Club.
