= Walter Hughes (pastoralist) =

Australian philanthropist

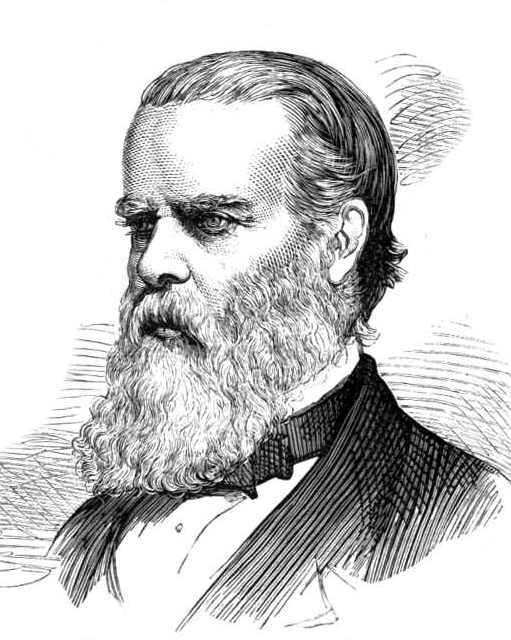
Walter Hughes, 1875 engraving

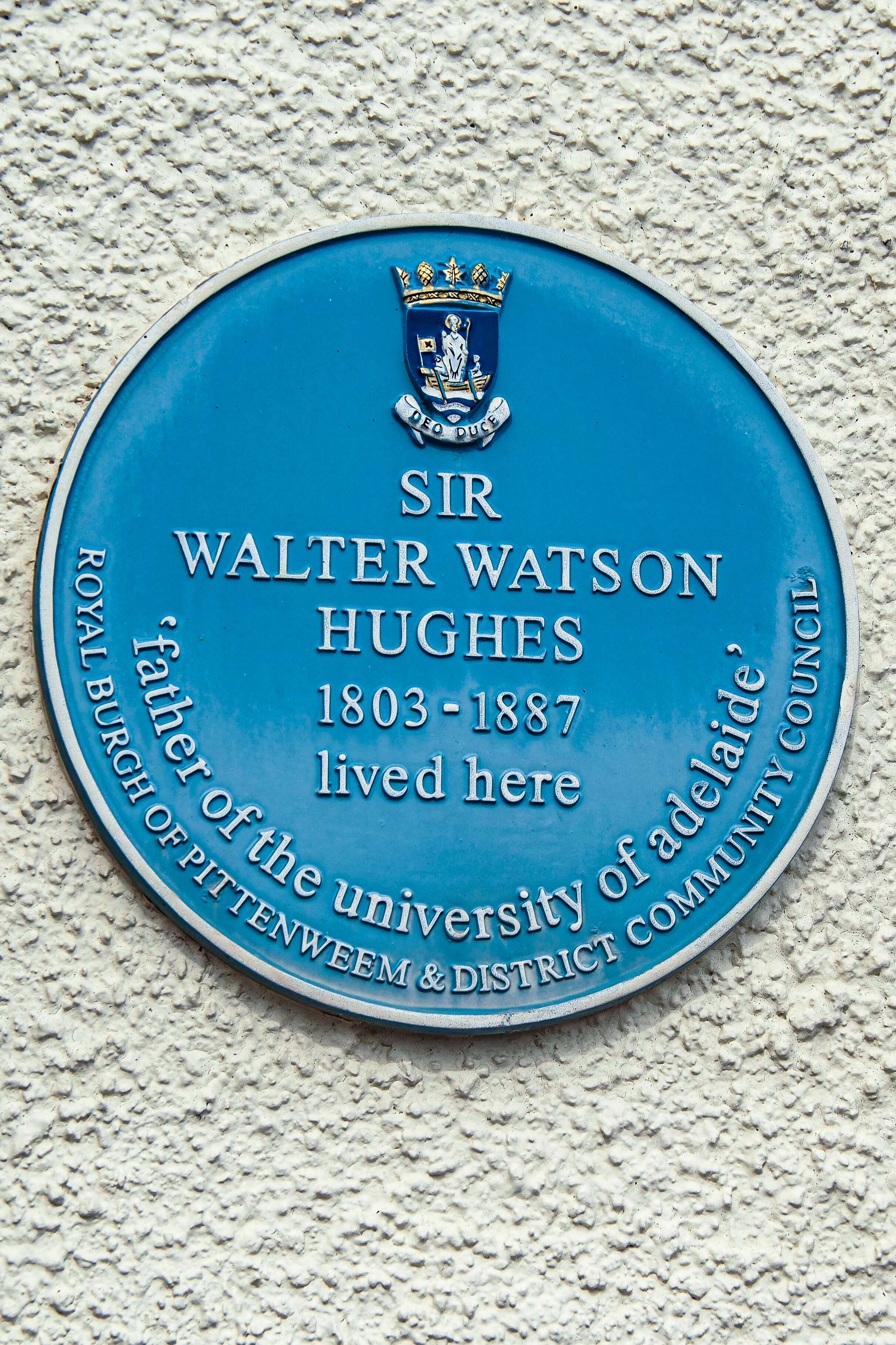
Plaque on former residence of Sir Walter Watson Hughes on Mid Shore at Calman’s Wynd, Pittenweem, Fife, Scotland.

Sir Walter Watson Hughes (22 August 1803 – 1 January 1887), who before his knighthood was frequently referred to as "Captain Hughes", was a pastoralist, public benefactor and founder of the University of Adelaide, South Australia.

== Early life ==
Hughes was born in Pittenweem, Fife, Scotland, the third son of Thomas Hughes and his wife Eliza, née Anderson. Hughes attended school in Crail and was apprenticed to a cooper for a short time - he then entered the merchant service and became a master, including whaling in the Arctic for several years. After hearing of opportunities for trade in Asia, Hughes purchased a brig, Hero, in Calcutta and traded opium in the Indian Ocean and seas of China, having to contend with pirates.

== Australia ==
Hughes emigrated to South Australia in 1840, started business with Bunce & Thomson and took up land. One property, Spring Vale estate near Watervale, he planted with grape vines — Rhine riesling, Pedro Ximénez, temprano, shiraz and grenache. Hughes passed Spring Vale to his nephew James McKinnon Richman, and there C. A. Sobels began making wine, which was marketed in Adelaide by Hermann Büring. Sobels and Büring subsequently purchased the estate.

Hughes suspected land on which he kept sheep contained mineral deposits and informed his shepherds to look for minerals.. Hughes secured the largest interest in two mines.

== Late life ==
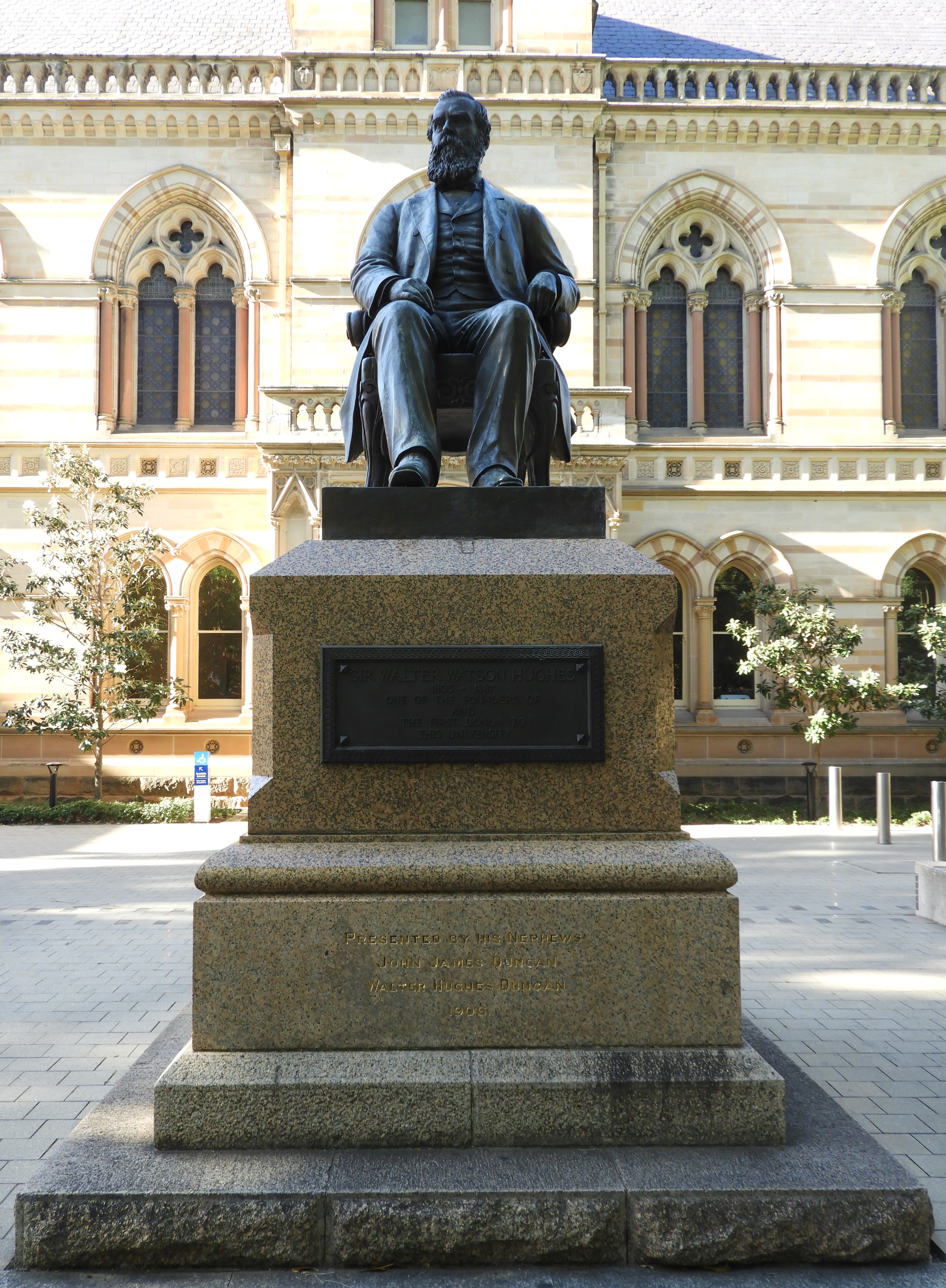
Statue of Sir Walter Watson Hughes at the University of Adelaide

Hughes and his wife subsequently returned to England, and bought the Fancourt estate in Chertsey, Surrey.

Hughes was knighted in 1880. Around this time he formed a partnership with P. B. Burgoyne, who was building up a market for fine Australian wines (notably Tintara) in London, and was in dire need of capital.

He died at his home on 1 January 1887 after a long illness.

== Legacy ==
The coastal town of Port Hughes was named in his honour.

== Family ==
On 22 September 1841 Hughes married Sophia Richman, eldest daughter of John Henry Richman, who arrived in South Australia with his family aboard Thomas Harrison in February 1839. They had no children together. He began a relationship with an Aboriginal woman (Mary Jane Narungga/Moor/Wanganeen) who gave birth to Walter Hughes's son John Sansbury in 1854.

Hughes was an uncle of Sir John James Duncan, and an ancestor of Adam Goodes.
