= Lady Macnaghten =

Lady MacNaghten was an English barque of 553 tons, founded in 1825, which made numerous voyages to Australia, but remembered as the "Fever ship" for her 1837 voyage when one in six passengers died of illness either en route or shortly after arrival.

== History ==
Her voyages to Australia included:

=== 1835 ===
Her first voyage to Australia left Dublin on 23 June 1835 for Sydney under Captain Hustwick, with 300 male prisoners, under the superintendence of Dr. Jarman, R. N. The guard consisted of Lieutenant Trapands and Baumgartner, and 29 soldiers of the 25th Regiment. Passengers were Michael Brown, clerk of the works for Sydney, Mrs. Brown and their four children, also eight women emigrants and four children.

=== 1837 ===
Billed as a "female emigrant ship", though the policy of bringing out women indiscriminately was being phased out in favour of family migration, and the ship departed Cork on 5 November 1836 with 412 emigrants.

Lady MacNaghten sailed from Britain to Australia non-stop, as was customary for emigrant ships, and the first news to reach the outside world that anything was amiss was when the ship and HMS Rattlesnake, with Governor Bourke on board, made contact about 200 miles (320 km) south of Port Phillip around 24 February. Captain Hustwick passed the news to Captain W. Hobson that around 50 adults and children had died on board, mostly from typhus, and many more, including the ship's surgeon, Dr. J. A. Hawkins, were seriously ill. Assistant surgeon Bowler of HMS Rattlesnake was placed on board and the two ships went their separate ways. On 26 February the ship pulled in to Spring Cove, where she lay at anchor and those unaffected or recovering were ferried ashore and quarantined under guard. Their clothing and bedding was burnt and they were accommodated in tents, while those still suffering remained on board. Hawkins, who was on his first voyage as a ship's surgeon, died on 2 April and was buried in the Quarantine Ground. Captain Hustwick had contracted the disease but recovered as did Dr. Bowler of the Rattlesnake. These three were popularly regarded as heroes; John Marshall, the London shipping agent whose duty it was to select prospective migrants and arrange their transportation, was the villain, dubbed "dealer in human flesh" for overcrowding the ship. Government regulations stipulated a maximum of 2 persons (including crew) for every 5 tons of Registered Burthen; Lady MacNaghten, of 550 tons should have carried no more than 334; she was carrying an equivalent of 336 adults, so certainly the ship was overcrowded, but the previous year she carried 300 convicts, a crew of 37 and 49 guards; 386 in all, but only lost two. Sixty-one Lady McNaghten passengers were lost, though probably not all to typhus.

An open letter of gratitude was published on 20 April, and signed by 13 passengers. Significantly, John Lazar, who lost three children to the contagion, and was under-compensated for his wardrobe (he was a tailor and actor) which had been destroyed, was not one of them.

=== 1838 ===
Carried 205 immigrants under the Bounty Scheme. Left Cromarty, Scotland on 26 Sept 1838, arriving in Sydney on 28 January 1839.

=== 1840 ===
To Sydney with cargo, arrived December; Captain Doughty. Arrived in Sydney on 16 December, leaving from Plymouth on 30 August, with 260 Immigrants. Dr. McNamara, Esq., Surgeon. Two adults and seven children died, and four births occurred during the passage.

=== 1847 ===
Left London 1 July, arrived in South Australia in October with settlers; Captain James Hibbert. Dr. A. C. Kelly, later a noted vigneron, was ship's surgeon.

=== 1850 ===
Left Plymouth on 24 February, arrived in South Australia in June with settlers; Captain James Hibbert.
