= Meta Buring =

Australian singer (1875–1955)

Caroline Meta Buring
- Born: 1875; Friedrichswalde, South Australia
- Died: 7 November 1955 (aged 79–80)
- Occupations: contralto singer and music teacher

Caroline Meta Buring (1875 – 7 November 1955) was a South Australian contralto and singing teacher.

== History ==
Meta was born in Friedrichswalde, South Australia (later renamed Tarnma) near Kapunda in 1875 to H. F. A. Lina Buring née Dohrenwendt ( – 1934) and T. G. Hermann Buring (1846 – 8 September 1919) of the winemaking firm of H. Buring & Sobels. She grew up with two brothers, Rudolph (1872–1950) and Leo Buring (1876–1961), and two sisters.

She was educated at Sturt Street Public School, and won an exhibition in 1887 which enabled her to study at the Advanced School for Girls; she matriculated in 1890 but did not go on to University. Instead she pursued her interest in music and singing and studied elocution under Wybert Reeve. She studied for several years at the Melbourne Conservatorium of Music under Madam Wiedemann and Marshall Hall, returning to Adelaide in 1897, appearing first at the Adelaide Town Hall with the Adelaide Liedertafel and (Hermann) Heinicke's Grand Orchestra, then concerts with pianists Eduard Scharf and Elsie Hall and complimentary concerts to P. A. Howells and Lucy Stevenson, all at the Town Hall. She also appeared with Amy Castles at the Exhibition Building.

Following complimentary references by Amy Sherwin, a group of Adelaide music-lovers subscribed to a fund to send her to Europe for further musical education. She left in 1900, first for Frankfurt, where she spent a year under Julius Stockhausen at his music school, studying German, French, Italian, and English diction, sight-reading and choral work, and also receiving private tuition. Next she spent a year in London, studying under Minna Fischer. Arthur Chappell gave her the opportunity to sing at one of his famous "Monday Pops" concerts with the Eugène Ysaÿe quartet, followed by other concerts at the Albert Hall, the Crystal Palace, the Bechstein Hall, and others. She gained valuable experience in teaching by taking pupils in Liverpool and Manchester, where she also appeared in several of Hans Richter's Hallé concerts, and at the Free Trade Hall with Melbourne soprano Mary Conley. She might have stayed longer, but following her parents' wishes she returned to Adelaide in 1908, on the steamer Commonwealth.

On her return to Adelaide her performances in large halls were rare. This may have been linked to a throat injury which she suffered while in England, and required medical attention; she was active however as a teacher of singing, with a studio in Currie Street, later on King William Street.

She was a prominent member of the Adelaide Women's Club, and frequently entertained with songs at Club socials, private soirées and Advanced School reunions.

It is likely she shared a residence on Flinders Street, Kent Town with her sister Edelgarde Adele Buring (1878 – 16 November 1948), about whom little has been found since 1924.
