= Ada Crossley =

Australian singer (1871–1929)

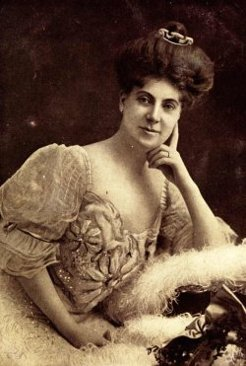

Background information
- Born: 3 March 1871; Tarraville, Gippsland, Victoria
- Died: 17 October 1929 (aged 58) London, UK
- Genres: opera
- Instrument: contralto
- Label: Red Seal

Ada Jemima Crossley (3 March 1871 – 17 October 1929) was an Australian contralto notable as the first Red Seal recording artist engaged in the US by the Victor Talking Machine Company in 1903.

Born at Tarraville, Gippsland, Victoria, she was the daughter of Edwards Wallis Crossley (died 11 April 1902), an ironmonger, and Harriette, née Morris, both from Northamptonshire, England. Ada was the sixth surviving child in a family of twelve children.

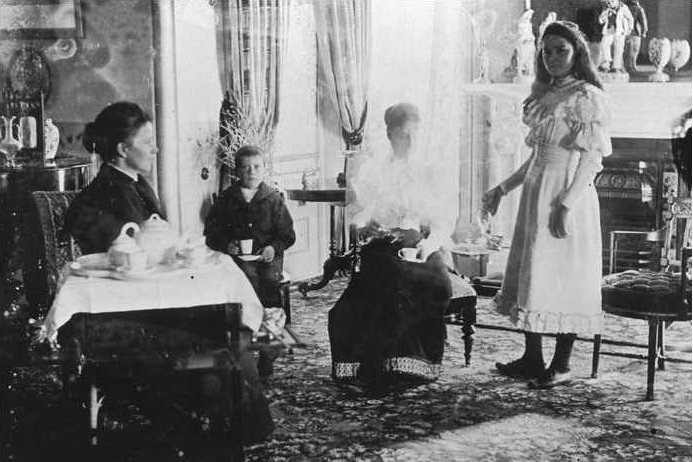
Afternoon Tea at the Brookmans, c.1895. (Edwin Tce, Gilberton, SA), L-to-R: Mrs. George Brookman, Norman Brookman, Ada Crossley and May Brookman

She was the principal contralto in the choir of Charles Strong's Australian Church. She made her début performance in Sydney in January 1892, and also became well known there.

On 27 February 1923 she appeared in concert at Wigmore Hall in support of her friend and protégée, the South Australian contralto Clara Serena. The London newspapers gave positive reviews, also praising Serena's accompanist (and husband) Roy Mellish.

== Personal ==
On 16 May 1905 Crossley married Francis Muecke CBE FRCS, son of H. C. E. Muecke. The wedding, which took place at St Marylebone Parish Church, was a grand social occasion. A choir comprising Evangeline Florence, Mary Conly, Nora Long, Elsie Jones, Eva Mylott, Meta Buring, May Otto, Ivy Ansley and May Putney sang the hymn "O Perfect Love", specially arranged by George H. Clutsam and directed by Minna Fischer.

For a time they had a cottage home at St John's Wood, but as Muecke's London practice grew, a city address became necessary.

There were no children. Crossley died in London after a short illness on 17 October 1929.
