= P. B. Burgoyne =

English Wine Merchant

Peter Bond Burgoyne (11 February 1844 – 4 September 1929) was an English wine merchant, founder and head of P. B. Burgoyne and Co., Ltd., and Australian Wine Importers, Ltd. He has been called "the father of the Australian wine industry in Great Britain".

== History ==
Burgoyne was born in Doddbrook, Kingsbridge, South Devon, a son of John Trist Burgoyne (c. 1812–1856) and Mary Ann Burgoyne, née Bond (c. 1808–1854). Both parents died before he reached his 'teens, and he was brought up by an aunt and uncle. At age 13 he found employment with a firm in Portsmouth, but had an ambition to travel, and through his brother, then aged 21, was in 1858 introduced to Robert Allsopp of Newfoundland, who offered him a five-year apprenticeship, which he turned down, but accepted a job in his office instead. The business failed a few years later, and he secured a position with St. John's, Newfoundland brokers W. H. Mare & Co., for whom he worked for twelve months, then transferred to Brooking & Co. of the same town, where he acted as second bookkeeper. At the age of 21 he returned to London, having been offered a position with his brother, by now a prominent London estate agent.

This fell through, and he found employment as a bookkeeper in the office of an Exeter wine merchant. This led, around 1868, to a management position in a similar business in Mincing Lane, London. Around 1871 his aunt, Mrs. Thomas Colton (née Bond, a sister of Burgoyne's mother), of McLaren Vale, South Australia, mentioned to Dr. A. C. Kelly, founder of Tintara, that her nephew would make a good agent in London. That meeting led to A. L. Elder, brother of Sir Thomas, suggesting to Burgoyne that he take on the business of importing and bottling Australian wines, which was at the time practically unknown to English consumers. They signed a three-year contract, which was extended by an extra year. He thereupon founded his own business, P. B. Burgoyne & Co., with offices and cellars in conjunction with the Tintara company, at 50 Old Broad Street, London EC.

Business was difficult for the first ten years. At one stage he became insolvent and was "thrown a lifeline" by Capt. (later Sir) Walter Watson Hughes, who became a partner. In 1886 the taxes which made Australian wines uncompetitive was relaxed. Burgoyne converted his business to a joint-stock company and moved to larger premises, "Burgoyne House" at 6 Dowgate Hill, London, with cellars at the Dowgate Vaults, Cannon Street. Somehow it was reported that the company had ceased to exist. Hughes died in 1887, but by that time Burgoyne was in a sufficiently strong position to drop his European brands and devote his considerable energies to the Australian trade, and any profit the firm made was spent on advertising. The company was restructured as a limited liability company in 1903 with Burgoyne as Governing Director and sons Cuthbert, Alan and Lennox directors. They had an Australian office at 132 William Street, Melbourne and owned the Mount Ophir and Mount Athos vineyards and wineries in Rutherglen, Victoria.

In later years Burgoyne also represented South African winemakers. He had a home "Broadlands" at Sunninghill, Berkshire near Ascot, and was a great friend of Sir Edward Lucas, Agent-General for Australia in London 1918–1925. For 40 years his major interest outside business and his family was the National Hospital for Consumption and Diseases of the Chest (later Royal National Hospital for Diseases of the Chest) at Ventnor, Isle of Wight, of which he was chairman for the last 29 years of his life, as well as considerable financial support.

At the time of his death, Burgoyne's firm held the largest stock of duty-paid wine in London, exceeding 300,000 imperial gallons (1,400 kl), and owned Burgoyne House and huge stores in the east of London. He had spent more than £500,000 in advertising Australian wines, but given little credit in Australia for his efforts. His widow, who had been an active partner in the business, was at the age of 80 appointed chairman of Bond Investment Trust at a salary of £8,000 p.a., several millions in today's currency.

== Family ==
He married Marie Henrietta Johanna Achilles (1850 – February 1934) on 28 March 1872; they had four sons and four daughters:

- Eldest son Major Gerald Achilles Burgoyne ( – 4 March 1936) of the Third Dragoon Guards married Elsie Borlase of Richmond, London on 15 December 1897. He was injured at Mons, and was later appointed Cork Pursuivant of Arms in the Irish College of Heralds, and was an artist of some ability. He was killed by an Italian bomb while serving with the Ethiopian Red Cross.
- Cuthbert John Burgoyne (1876–1955), head of the company, was exempted from military service in the 1914–18 war. He married Beatrice Fenner (1876–1914)

- John Fenner Burgoyne (c. 1900–1976) succeeded his father as head of P. B. Burgoyne & Co. Ltd. He married (Eleanor) Rosalie de Vine (26 May 1904 – 26 January 1984) in March 1924

- Third son Lieutenant-Colonel Sir Alan Hughes Burgoyne (1880 – 26 April 1929) was appointed Knight Bachelor in 1922. He represented North Kensington 1910–1922 and Aylesbury 1924–1929 for the Conservative and Unionist Party, and was a director of many notable companies, including his father's businesses. He married Irene Victoria Eason MacDonald of Darling Point, Sydney on 7 March 1906. He was an authority on the Royal Navy, and wrote several books on the subject. He had a home "Poulett Lodge", Twickenham.
- Youngest son Lieutenant Lennox Stuart Burgoyne (1888– )

Their daughters were:

- Eldest daughter Elsie Marie Burgoyne married Captain Leslie Fletcher on 3 June 1898
- Muriel Burgoyne
- Third daughter (Dorothy) May Burgoyne (1882–1968) married Charles Houdret on 12 November 1907
- Constance Maude Burgoyne (1884– ) married Captain Godfrey Seys of Boverton

== Postscript ==
Burgoyne's company became part of Emu Wine Co. Pty. Ltd. in 1956, later taken over by Thomas Hardy & Sons, which became Accolade Wines.
