= Adelaide Women's Club =

Social club in Adelaide, South Australia

Adelaide Women's Club was a social club for women which operated from 1922 to 1938 in Adelaide, South Australia.

== History ==
The Adelaide Women's Club was founded in June 1922 by a handful of professional women led by Adelaide Miethke, and incorporated later the same year. Club premises were located in upstairs rooms previously operated by the YWCA on Grenfell Street, but soon moved to what had been Beaches Restaurant on Hindley Street, about 100 metres from King William Street. Its membership was drawn from Adelaide's business, public, professional, scientific, literary, and artistic communities, but also welcomed married women with "home duties". The Club was founded with 163 members, and by September 1923 had grown to 281. Membership was £1 a year, and the entrance fee 2/6. Facilities included library, drawing rooms, dressing rooms and a cafeteria. By March 1930 membership had grown to 320.

The foundation committee consisted of secretary/manager E. Gill (Eileen?), and president Adelaide Miethke, with two vice presidents Amy Tomkinson and Phebe Watson, treasurer Gertrude May Fulston JP (1893–1954), and six ordinary members. Trustees were Adelaide Miethke, Phebe Watson, and Gertrude May Fulston. Committee membership remained stable for many years, with Meta Buring (1875–1955) being one of the few new faces.

In 1930 a wall of their building collapsed, followed by a fire, and the committee saw this as an opportunity to move from Hindley Street to larger premises in the White Hart building, Peel Street, just around the corner; additional facilities included a bathroom, five bedrooms and a balcony. With the new premises, the Club enjoyed a surge in membership, and Mrs. Decimus Smith, née Irene France (1884–1966) was appointed business manager. Prominent members from around this time were the singer Charlotte Grivell and Lady Hore-Ruthven (also known as Lady Gowrie).

For practically the whole life of the Club, Alliance Française met at the Club rooms. Other organizations to use the Club's facilities were the United Arts Club, and the National Council of Women also held their meetings at the Club, which they made their headquarters. Various Old Scholars' groups held their reunions there, as did the Advanced School for Girls for their annual bridge night, one of the last functions to be held in the clubrooms.

The Club went into recess in December 1938 and never reopened. No public announcement was made regarding its closure either before or after.
