= Elsie Cornish =

Australian gardener

Elsie Marion Cornish was a South Australian landscape gardener and was born in 1870 in Glenelg, South Australia.

== Life and influences ==
The daughter of Samuel Cornish (an ironmonger) and Agnes (née Kirkpatrick), Cornish was educated in North Adelaide and trained herself in landscape design. She began her career as a professional gardener around 1916, gaining an interest in landscape gardening and design. As her career progressed through the 1910s, she gained a loyal cliéntele.

Cornish lived and had her plant nursery at her family's home in Palmer Place, North Adelaide, where Henry Stuckey and Edmund William Wright, Adelaide architects prominent in the mid-1800s, had once lived.

She died on 20 October 1946.

== Key Design Features ==
Cornish's ideas were influenced by designers such as Gertrude Jekyll, and by Mediterranean traditions. She used formal elements such as symmetry and liked circular shapes.

== Projects ==
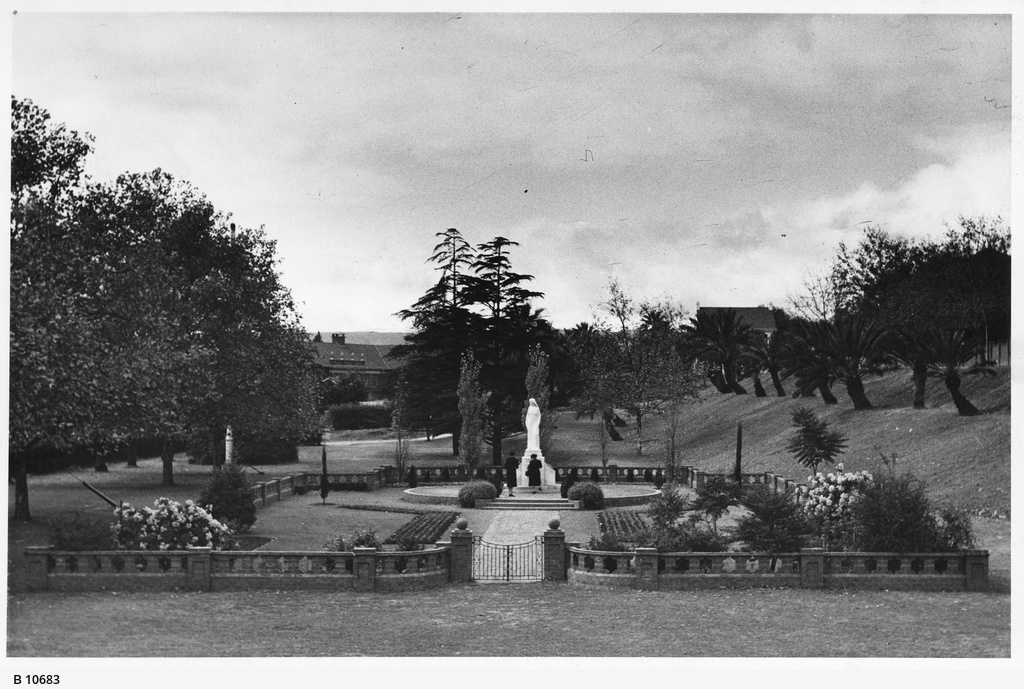
Pioneer Women's Memorial Garden of Remembrance in 1941

Commissioned in 1938 and opened in 1941, the Pioneer Women's Memorial Garden in Adelaide, South Australia is one of Cornish's most significant commissions. Also of note is her design of the University of Adelaide escarpment (1934–46). Her employment at the university was on the personal recommendation of Walter Hervey Bagot, a prominent Adelaide architect of the time. She was still employed by the university on her unexpected passing in 1946.

Cornish worked on the grounds of Christ Church, North Adelaide, and on private gardens including those of Isabel (wife of Sir Sidney Kidman); Sir George Brookman; Sidney Wilcox; and the Darling, Darian Smith and Reid families.

Cornish advised Eva Waite on her garden Broadlees at Crafers and assisted her sister-in-law Gwyneth Cornish with the design of the gardens at Stangate House, Aldgate.

Cornish entered the annual Royal Adelaide Show model garden competition (1929–36). Her entry 'Narcissus Pool' in 1932 won the Royal Adelaide Show's Challenge Cup (Open Class) for Model Gardens.

== Recognition ==
Following her death, Cornish's brother founded the Elsie Marion Cornish Prize in Botany at the Faculty of Science, University of Adelaide.
