= Adelaide Miethke =

Australian educator and teacher (1881–1962)

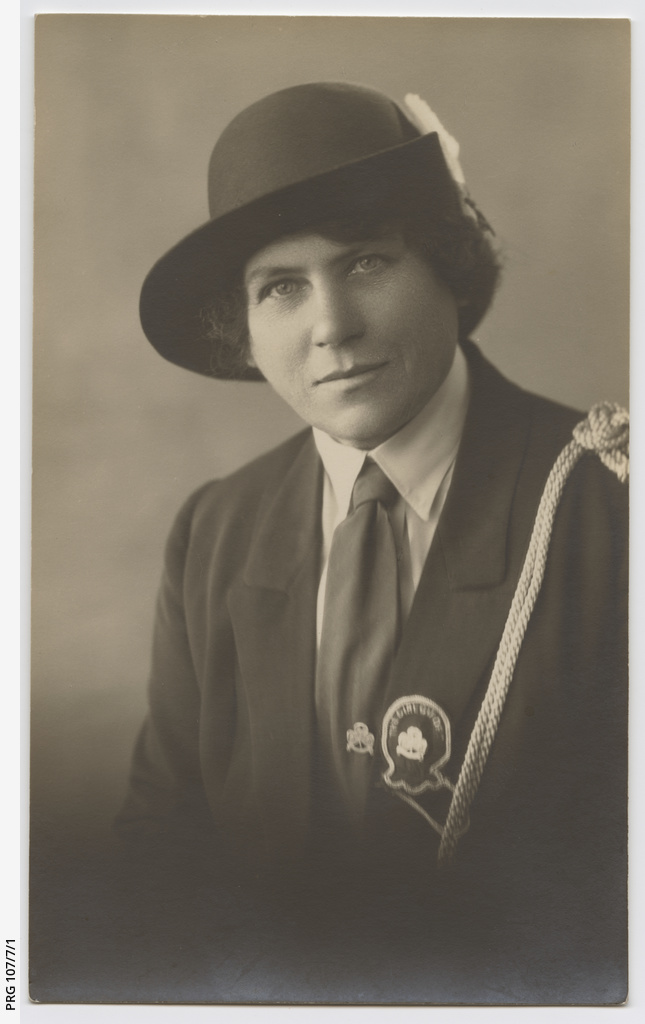
- Born: 8 June 1881; Manoora
- Died: 4 February 1962; Woodville
- Occupations: School teacher, education activist

Adelaide Laetitia "Addie" Miethke, OBE (8 June 1881 – 4 February 1962), was a South Australian educator and teacher who was pivotal in the formation of the School of the Air using the existing Royal Flying Doctor Service radio network.

== Parents ==
Rudolph Carl Alexander Miethke (14 November 1832 – 21 October 1931), sometimes written Carl R. A. Miethke, born in Stargard, Prussia, now in Poland, migrated with his parents (Carl) Gustav Adolph Miethke and his wife Louisa, née Gaster, to South Australia on the San Francisco from Hamburg, arriving in June 1850, and settled at Blumberg (now Birdwood). He had two siblings on the boat: Augusta Mathilde Amalie Miethke, and Carl Emil Miethke. He spent a few years on the Victorian goldfields, followed by extensive overseas travel, during which he served from 1861 to 1864 with Abraham Lincoln's 2nd California Infantry Regiment. On his return to Adelaide he joined the South Australian teaching service. In November 1869 he married Emma Caroline "Louisa" Schultze, second daughter of Kapunda naturalist Frederick Schultze, and sister of Alfred Schultze, both members of Goyder's 1868–1870 expedition to the Northern Territory. He qualified as a teacher, and as was the policy at the time, was in his first years made to serve in a succession of small country schools: Parrot's Hill (near Moculta) in 1867, Reedy Creek in 1868, Mount Rufus then St. Kitts in 1869, moving to Angaston in 1871, Dalkey school (at Sichem) in 1872, Monarto in 1873, Carlsruhe (near Waterloo) in 1876, Chinkford in 1877, Manoora in 1880, Port Victor 1881–1885, Goolwa 1886–1891 and Woodville from 1892 until July 1905, when he retired.

== Early life and education ==
Adelaide Miethke was born at Manoora, South Australia, the sixth daughter of Rudolph and Emma Miethke. She was educated at Victor Harbor, Goolwa, and Woodville public schools, where in each her father was schoolmaster, and from Woodville she went to Hindmarsh as a "pupil teacher".

She later undertook further studies, while working at the same time, graduating with a Bachelor of Arts degree early in 1924.

== Career ==
In 1903 Miethke enrolled with the Teachers' Training College under Andrew Scott.

In 1905 she started at Lefevre Peninsula School as a teacher's assistant, Victor John Pavia (c. 1857–1934) then being headmaster. She was fortunate in her "choice" of school, as V. J. Pavia encouraged originality in implementing what she had been taught. She showed such promise that Alfred Williams (c. 1864–1913), the Director of Education, exempted her from the usual requirement for student teachers to serve two years in outback schools.

She concurrently studied art at the School of Design and further advanced studies in English and history, at nights, as spare time and her finances permitted.

With the inception of High Schools in 1911, Miethke was transferred to Lefevre Peninsula District High School, became chief assistant, and subsequently senior mistress at Woodville High School.

In 1912 the Women Teachers' Progressive League was formed, whose chief aim was to improve women teachers' pay, condition and opportunities; she was to serve as secretary for six years and president for twelve. In 1915 the League achieved prominence when they hosted a conference in Adelaide, at which Lady Galway gave an inspiring speech. Out of the conference came 21 resolutions which were submitted to the Department, most relating to training qualifications, outback work, teaching conditions, system of examinations, and inspection; it took around ten years, but all were eventually realised.

In 1915 the League received permission from the Director of Education, M. M. Maughan (1856–1921), to organise the war efforts of school children, and following a suggestion from Miss S. N. Twiss, raised funds for a soup kitchen at the front. That was the beginning of the Children's Patriotic Fund, organised by Miethke, which raised £250,000. In 1916 she was elected, with J. W. Odgers, a vice-president of the (South Australian) Public School Teachers' Union, the first woman to hold that position, and again in 1918, with J. D. A. Drinkwater.

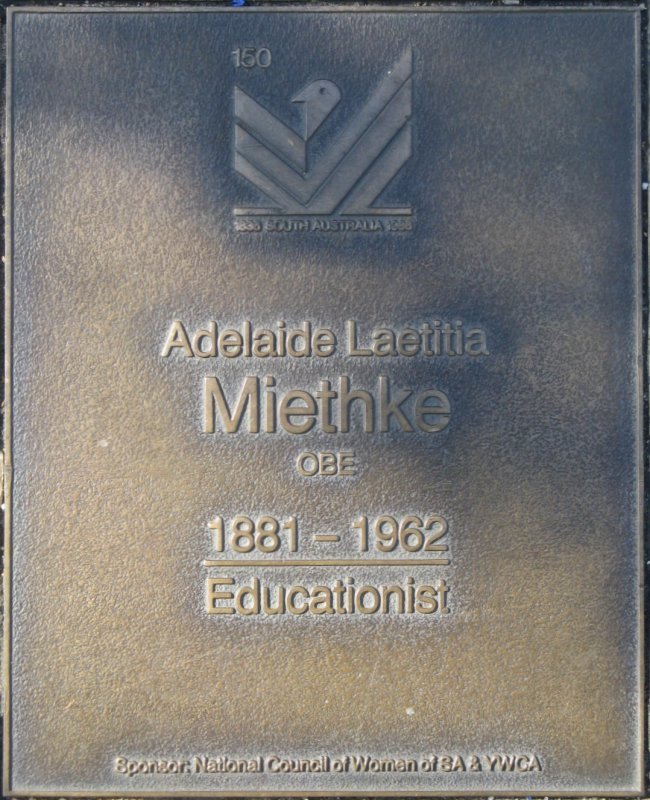
Jubilee 150 Walkway plaque - Adelaide Laetitia Miethke

After the war she resumed her night studies and completed her Bachelor of Arts course and was awarded her degree early in 1924.

In August 1924 she was sent by the Department to accompany Inspector Mary Kidd MBE, of New South Wales, on a tour of inspection of the Broken Hill schools, and to note the organisation of central and domestic art schools. She was appointed Inspector in November that year, which meant she had to resign from the Women Teachers' Progressive League.

The government inaugurated separate schools for girls in January 1925, and Miethke was appointed to take charge of the central schools system. She then had complete charge of nine new schools for girls, with special attention to the new super-primary branches where technical work had been introduced. The Department sent her to Sydney and Melbourne in 1925 to investigate policies and methods being adopted there.

She was elected president of the National Council of Women in 1935, and as such president of the executive committee of the Women's Centenary Council. She had a very high profile during the 1936 Centenary year, speaking on the radio virtually every week and appearing as organiser or guest of honour at a host of rallies, conferences and a dramatic Pageant of Empire which she herself choreographed and organised. This featured 13,600 schoolchildren whom she personally directed, through a megaphone, at the Adelaide Oval. The two performances, on 27 and 28 November 1936, each attracted 40,000 spectators.

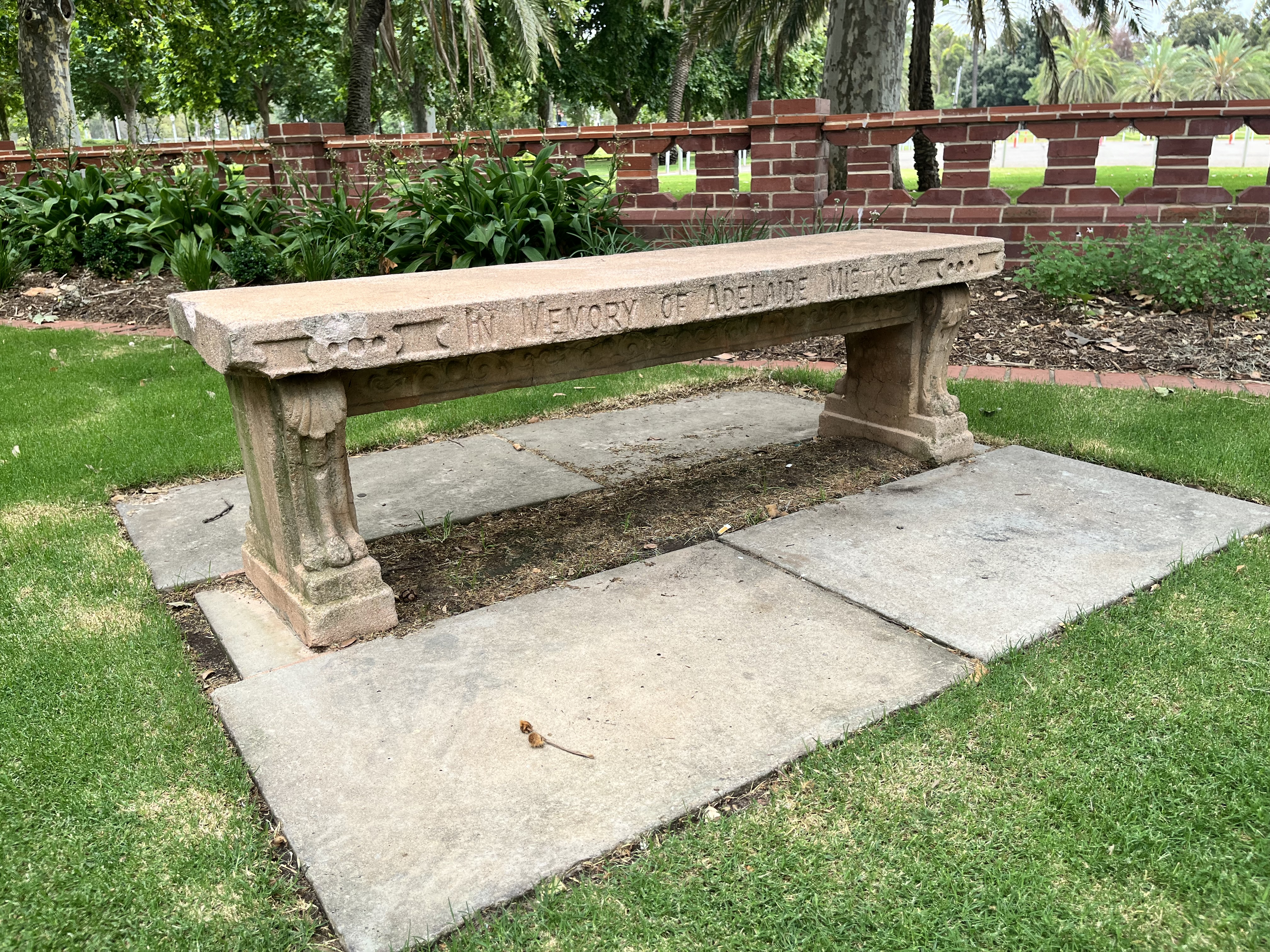
Stone bench near the northern wall of the Pioneer Women's Memorial Garden in Adelaide. The bench was donated by the Trustees, and engraved "In Memory of Adelaide Miethke". Declared a memorial by Lady Bastyan, wife of the Governor of South Australia on 19 April 1963.

A book was produced, titled A Book of South Australia – Women in the First Hundred Years, largely through the efforts of Phebe Watson (1876–1964). More lasting memorials were the Pioneer Women's Memorial Garden and the Aerial Medical Base at Alice Springs for the Australian Aerial Medical Services (South Australian section), the "Flying Doctor Service".

In November 1937 the Women's Centenary Council was dissolved, leaving an executive committee of Miethke, Phebe Watson, Mrs. D. P. McGuire, Mrs. C. E. Dolling, and Gisela Siebert (with Mrs. E. R. Lawrie as proxy during Miss Siebert's absence) to oversee realisation of these commitments.

During the Second World War she was once again to the fore in raising money for the benefit of Australia's soldiers. From 1940 to 1946 she directed the Schools' Patriotic Fund, with at one point Dorothy May Marshall as an assistant. Maithke also served on the Women's War Service Council. She had retired from the Education Department in 1941. SPF funds not spent during the War went into the purchase of a hostel, named Adelaide Miethke House and run by the Y.W.C.A., for use by country girls attending schools in the city.

Other unspent SPF money was passed on to the (Royal) Flying Doctor Service and was used to found the "School of the Air", an idea formulated by Miethke and driven by her. Its base was set up at the Alice Springs Higher Primary School with a team of teachers talking over the Flying Doctor network to, and receiving feedback from, children in isolated locations with their pedal radios or battery-operated transceivers. The service officially started on 20 September 1950.

== Other interests ==
- She was a friend of John Flynn and editor of the RFDS magazine Air Doctor
- Having retired as Inspector of Girls' Schools in June 1941, from July 1941 to 1946 she edited the Education Department's monthly magazine for SA schoolchildren, The Children's Hour.
- She was founding president in 1942 of the Woodville District Child Welfare Association which established four preschools; the Adelaide Miethke Kindergarten (opened 1953) still flourishes.
- She was from 1925 to 1939 Commissioner of the Girl Guides' schools division, and member of the State council.
- She was involved with YWCA in South Australia
- She was a local organiser for the United Nations Appeal for Children
- She was an active member of the Royal Commonwealth Society, the National Council of Women (as State and national president)
- She was an active member of the Adelaide Women's Club and the Catherine Helen Spence Scholarship Committee.
- She was an active member of the Ladies Harbour Lights Guild, an adjunct to Missions to Seamen.

She died at the family home at 24 Park Street, Woodville.

== Recognition ==
She was appointed an Officer of the Order of the British Empire in 1937.

The Adelaide Miethke Kindergarten in Woodville was named in her honour.

In 1986 a plaque in recognition of her contribution to South Australia was included in the Jubilee 150 Walkway.

== Family ==
Rudolph Carl Alexander Miethke (14 November 1832 – 21 October 1931) married Emma Schultze ( – c. 8 August 1892) on 6 November 1869. Their family included:

- Gustav Joseph "Gus" Miethke (25 Jan 1871 – 6 November 1949), mentioned in dispatches during WWI
- Emilia Louisa (Emilie Louise?) Miethke (14 February 1873 – 1952)
- Mathilde Emma Miethke (8 January 1875 – 1958), infant mistress at Le Fevre Peninsula school
- Ada Ella "E. A." Miethke (24 January 1877 – 1961)
- Hermann Hubert Miethke (22 Feb 1879–1974) married Margaret Matilda Caroline Henderson ( – 1950) on 27 December 1905. He was Chief of Staff, G.P.O., Adelaide

- Meta Margaret Miethke (15 April 1907 – ) married Walter Gill in 1943
- Major Geoffrey Ronald Miethke MC (27 Jun 1916 ) married Lucy "Pat" Patten on 3 July 1944

- Adelaide Letitia Miethke (8 June 1881 – 1962) subject of this article
- Edith Esther Miethke (c. 1883 – 16 March 1909)
- Minna Octavia Miethke (28 May 1886 – 1962) was also a teacher
- Hilda H. Miethke (c. 1889 – 13 June 1913)
- Sylvia D. Miethke (c. 1892 – 3 September 1914)

All unmarried members of the family (A.L., E.A., E.E., G.J., M.E., and M.O. Miethke) lived in the family home at 24 Park Street, Woodville.
