= Torrens Parade Ground =

Heritage-listed building in Adelaide, South Australia

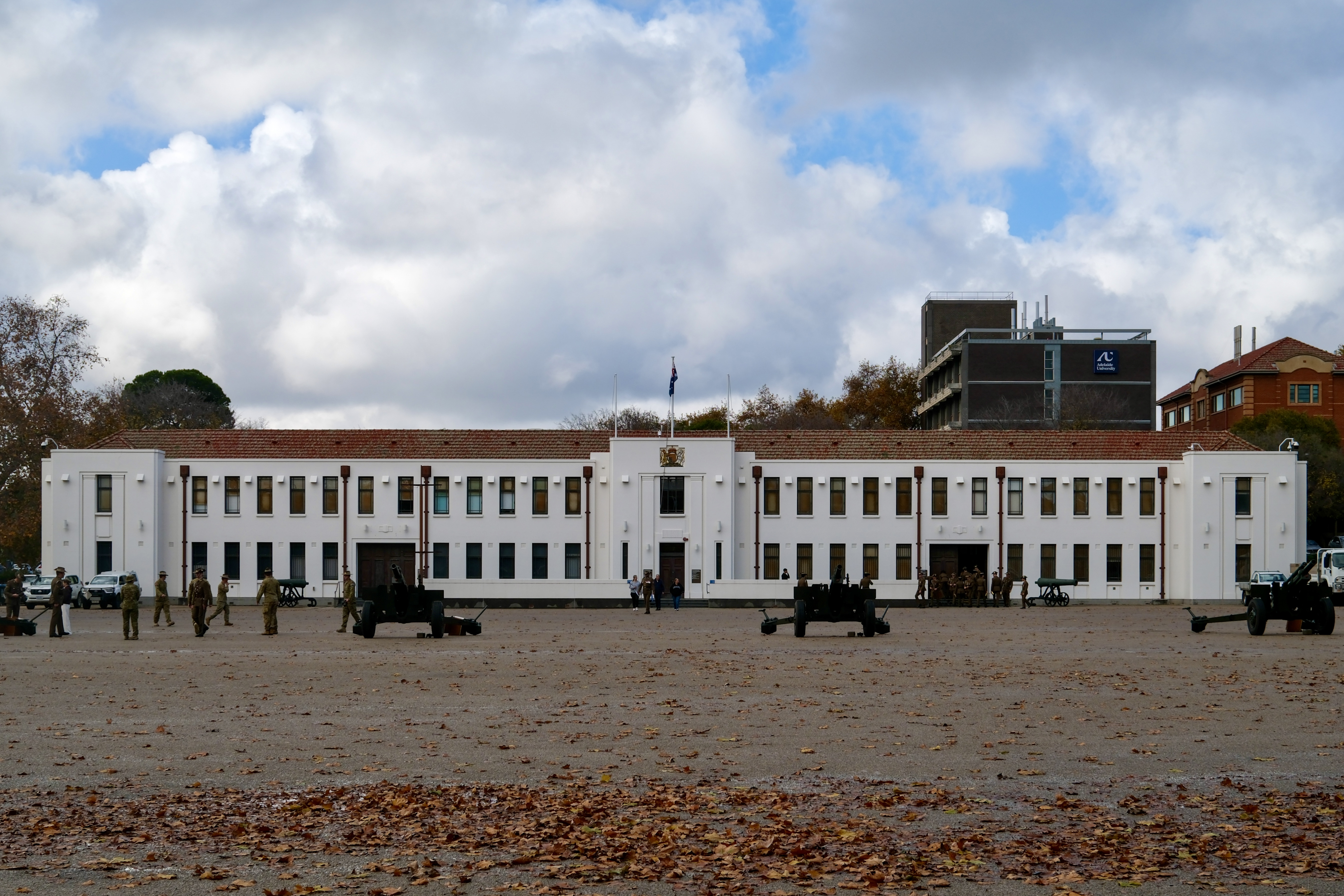
- Torrens Parade Ground in 2026
- Alternative names: Torrens Training Depot and Parade Ground

General information
- Type: Military training depot, drill hall and parade ground
- Architectural style: Inter-War Stripped Classical
- Location: King William Road, Adelaide, South Australia, Australia
- Coordinates: 34°55′4″S 138°36′2″E
- Completed: 1893
- Client: Australian Government
- Owner: Government of South Australia

Website
- Official website

South Australian Heritage Register
- Official name: Torrens Training Depot and Parade Ground
- Criteria: A
- Designated: 11 June 1998
- Reference no.: 14617

Torrens Parade Ground, which includes the former Torrens Training Depot and Drill Hall, is a former military facility located in Adelaide, South Australia.

== Location and description ==
The Parade Ground lies behind Government House, between King William Street and Kintore Avenue, with Victoria Avenue on its southern border. The Pioneer Women's Memorial Garden lies to the north-west.

South Australia's Vietnam War Memorial, and the Aboriginal and Torres Strait Islander War Memorial (by Robert Hannaford) are located in the grounds.

== History ==
The area was formerly used as a quarry for extracting stone and fill for building government buildings.

The Torrens Training Depot and Drill Hall were built in 1936.

=== Heritage listings ===
The parade ground and drill hall were listed on the South Australian Heritage Register on 11 June 1998.

Its significance was reported as follows:

The Torrens Training Depot was built in 1936 and is an excellent example of the Inter-War Stripped Classical style of architecture in Adelaide, particularly as interpreted by architects working for the Commonwealth Government. The strictly symmetrical design of the building and its low scale with simplified classical motifs and Art Deco decorative elements make this one of the most notable buildings in Adelaide of this style to be constructed pre World War Two. The internal arrangement of the building typifies the functional organisation of the Army and its physical requirements. All external detailing which is original to the 1936 building is significant. Internally the open unrestricted form of the drill hall is the most significant aspect. The topography of the Parade Ground indicates the previous use of this area as a quarry for stone and fill for the construction of government buildings, including Government House. [Adapted from Torrens Training Depot Conservation Plan (1992)]

In 1999, it was listed on the now-defunct Register of the National Estate

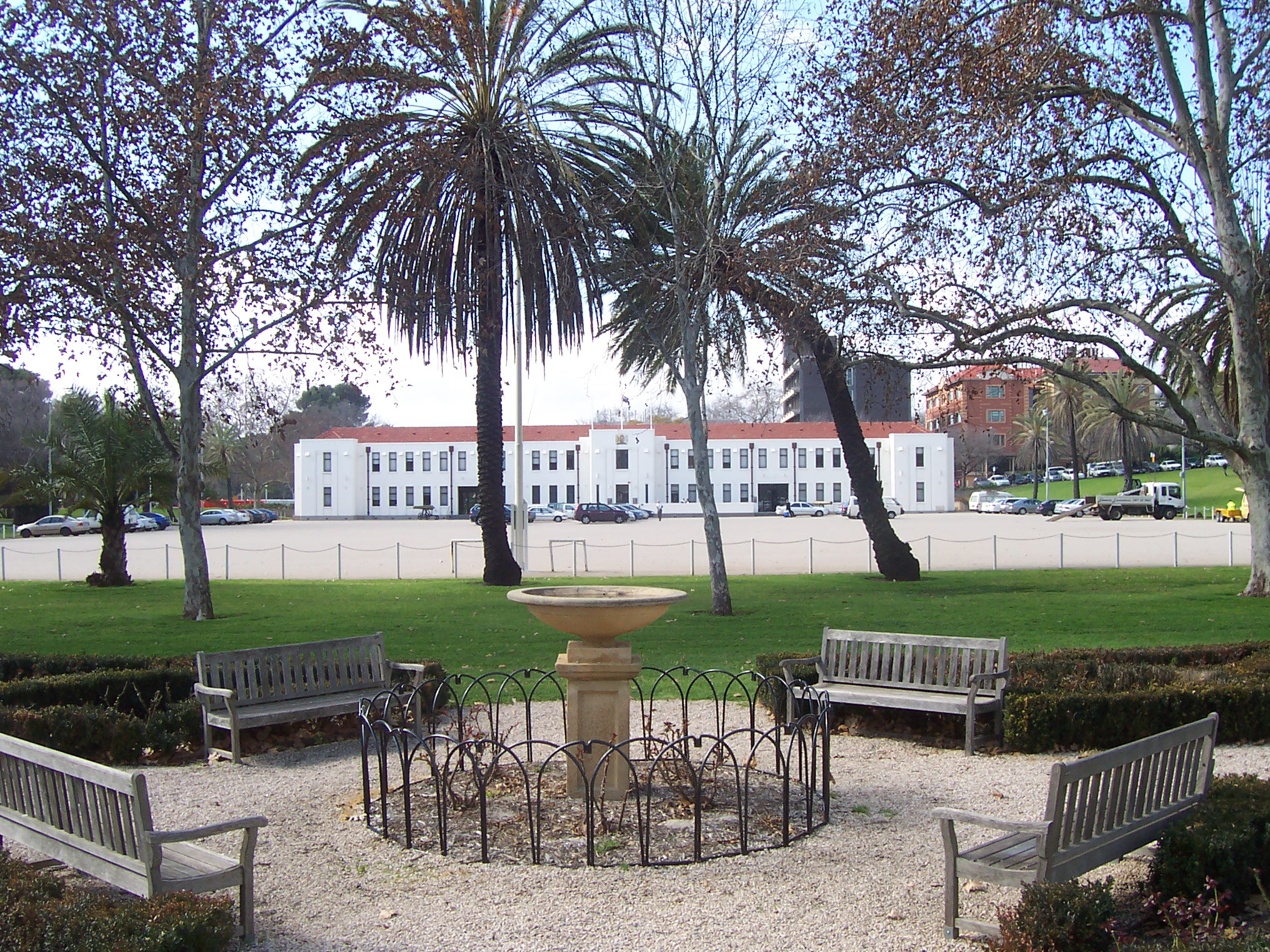

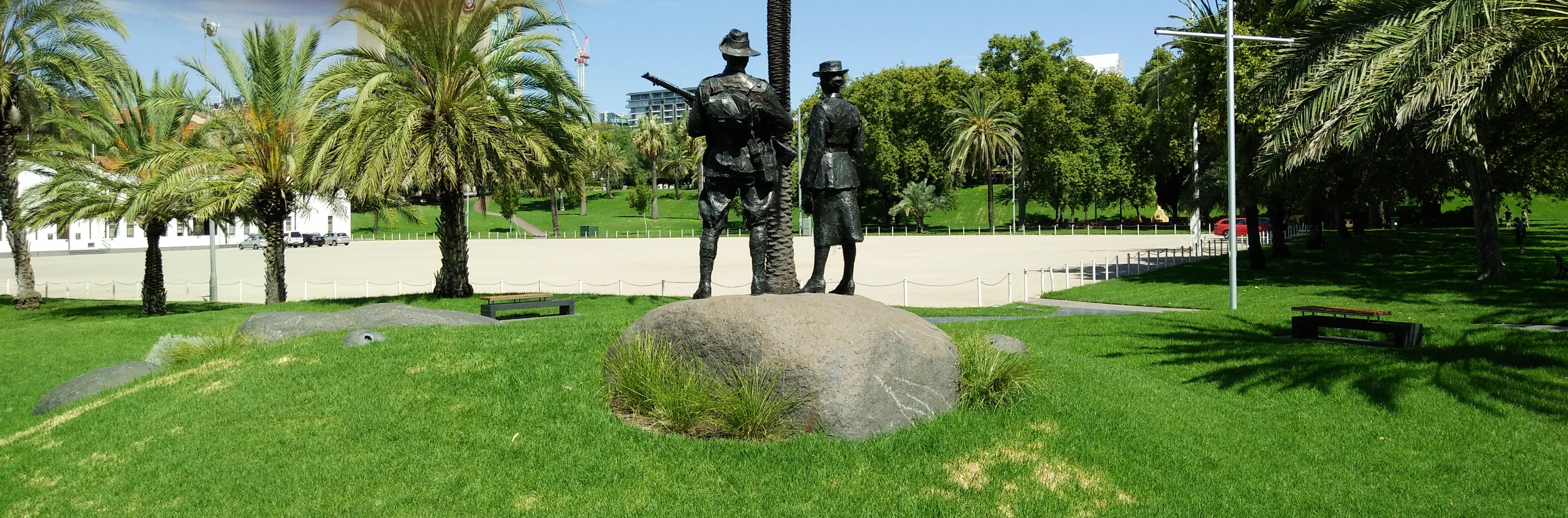
Aboriginal and Torres Strait Islander War Memorial

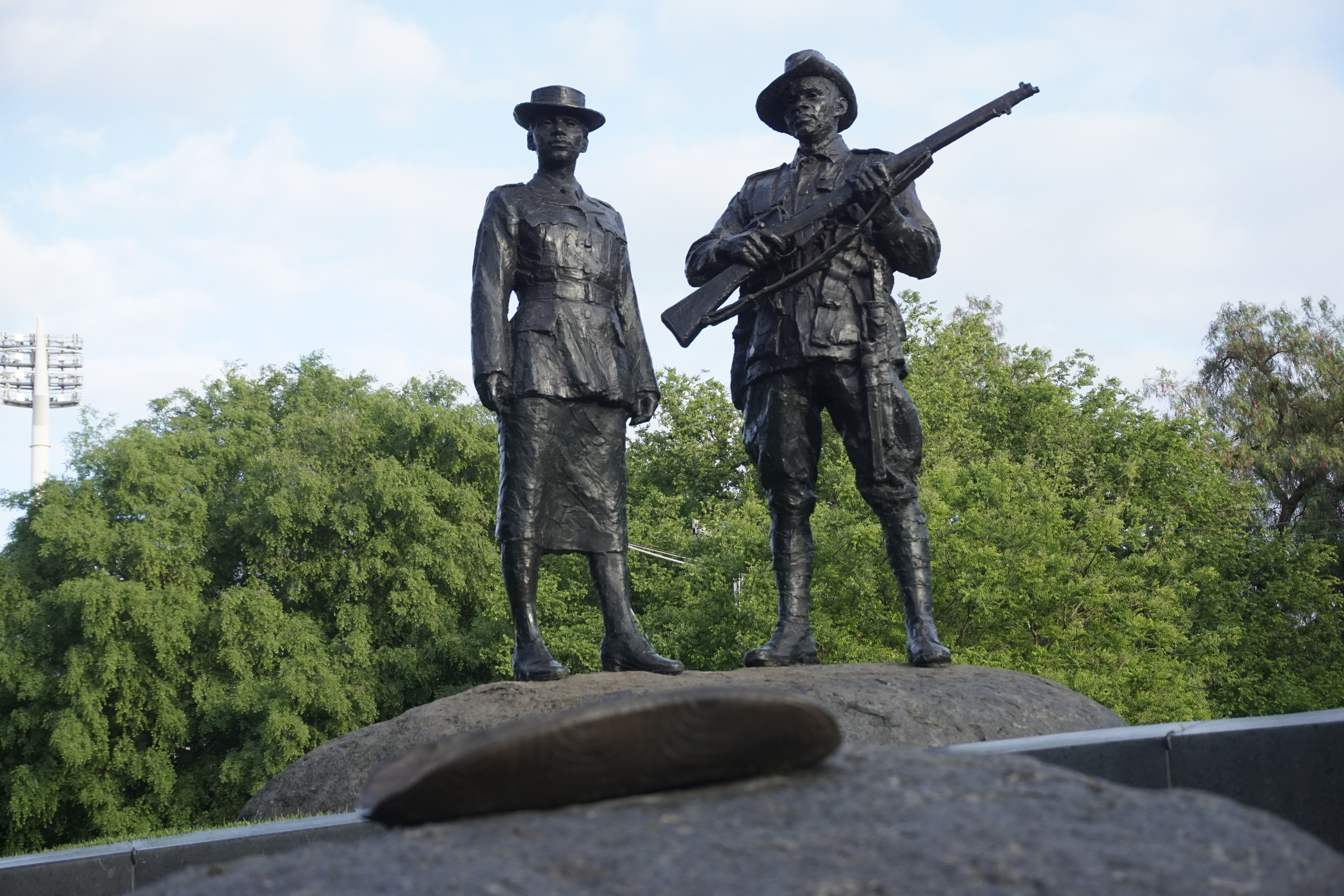
Front view

=== 21st century upgrades ===
In 2002 Premier Mike Rann announced and funded a major restoration and upgrade of the Torrens Parade Ground and its heritage listed "Drill Hall and Training Depot" building, to be used as a headquarters for veterans' organisations, and the main office of the History Trust of South Australia.

In 2021, the government announced that there would be a significant development; the grounds would be ripped up and gardens would be put in its place.

The Drill Hall underwent a major upgrade which was scheduled for completion at the end of January 2023.

== Uses ==
The History Trust of South Australia had its offices in the Drill Hall for 18 years, before relocating in 2022 to allow for the creation of a "veterans' hub" comprising the Department for Veteran Affairs, Returned Services League (RSL) South Australia, Vietnam Veterans Association, Air Force Association, and Legacy Club of South Australia and Broken Hill.

The Torrens Parade Ground and Drill Hall are used as venues for various events, such as for the Adelaide Fringe, fashion events and one-off markets.
