= Amy Eliza Castles =

Australian soprano (1880–1951)

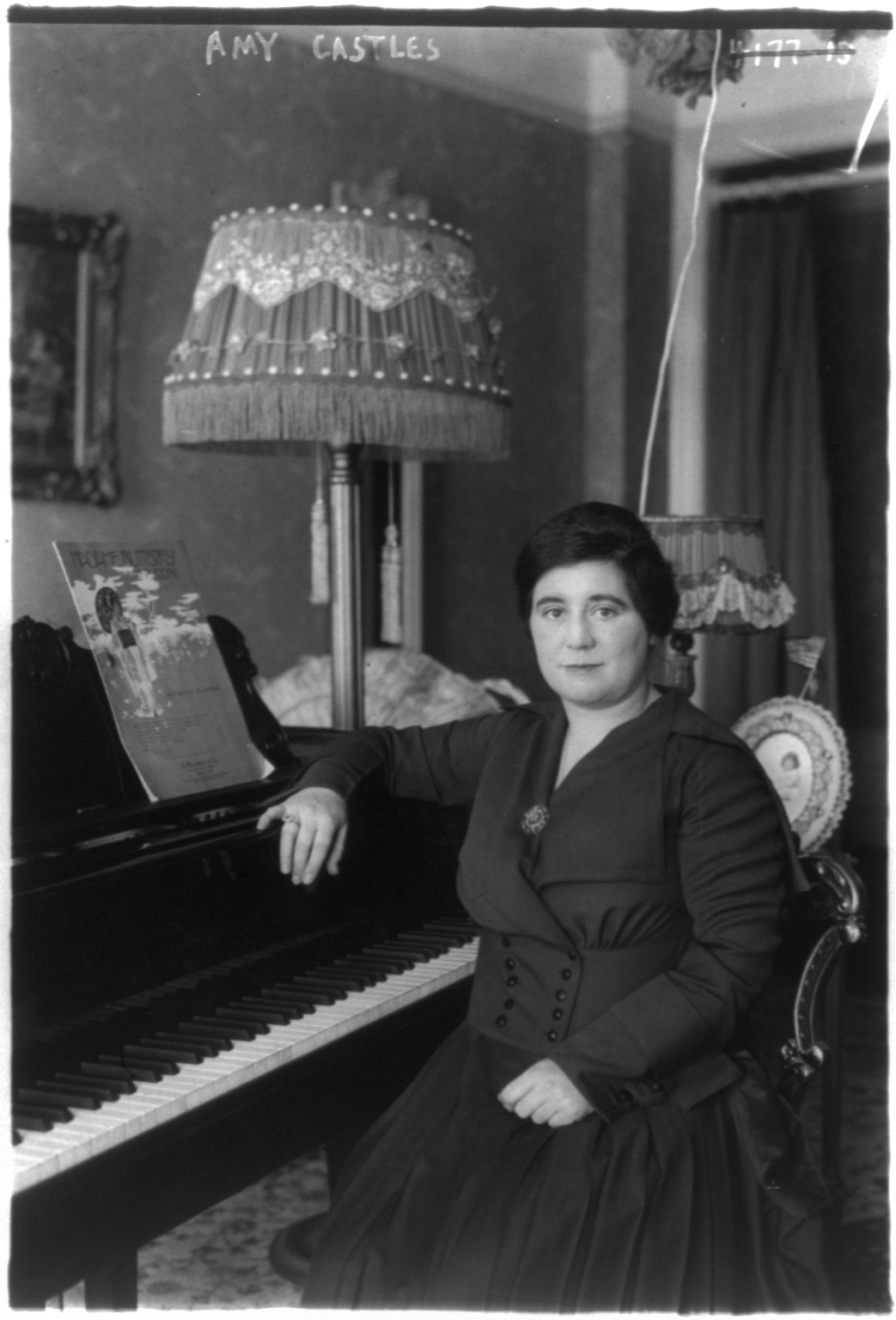
- Amy Eliza Castles in 1917
- Born: 25 July 1880; Melbourne, Victoria, Australia
- Died: 19 November 1951 (aged 71); Fitzroy, Victoria
- Occupation: dramatic soprano

Amy Eliza Castles (25 July 1880 – 19 November 1951), was an Australian dramatic soprano.

== Family ==
The daughter of Joseph Castles (1849-1933), and Mary Ellen Castles (1855-1937), née Fallon, Amy Eliza Castles was born in Melbourne, Australia on 25 July 1880.

Her two sisters, Ethel Margaret "Dolly" Castles (1884–1971) and Eileen Anne Castles (1886–1970) were also highly regarded, talented sopranos.

== Education ==
She was educated at St Kilian's primary school and St Mary's College.

== Career ==
On 26 March 1910 she sang the title role in the Australian premiere of Giacomo Puccini's Madama Butterfly, at the Theatre Royal in Sydney.

She made her United States début at Carnegie Hall in 1917.

Castles never married. She lived with her sister, Dolly Castles, in Camberwell. She died at a hospital in Fitzroy, Victoria, on 19 November 1951. She was buried in Box Hill Cemetery.
