= St Mary's College (Seymour) =

Location
- Seymour, Victoria; Australia
- Coordinates: 37°1′13″S 145°8′27″E

Information
- Motto: Protect and Care for Us
- Religious affiliation: Roman Catholic
- Established: 1900; 126 years ago
- Grades: F–12
- Website: smseymour.catholic.edu.au

St Mary's College is a Catholic primary and secondary school located in Seymour, Victoria, Australia, catering for students from F to Year 12 as of 2025. Established as St. Mary’s Convent School in 1900 by the Sisters of Mercy, the school went through a series of name changes from Sacred Heart College, and changes of site. In 1988 St. Mary’s Primary School and Sacred Heart College were amalgamated and became St. Mary’s College.
