= Leo Buring =

Australian winemaker

Hermann Paul Leopold Büring (7 October 1876 – 29 September 1961), generally known as Leo Buring, (Note: The umlaut over the "u" was discarded quite early and, like most other German families in Australia, not adopted its "ue" equivalent (Mücke, which became Muecke, was a notable exception).) was an Australian wine maker and merchant. He is commemorated at Roseworthy Agricultural College in the Leo Buring gold medal for dux of the oenology course.

== History ==
Buring was born in Friedrichswalde, a son of (Theodor Gustave) Hermann Büring (1846–1919) and (Henrietta Friedrike Auguste) Lina Büring, née Dohrenwendt (c. 1846–1934). His father was a wine merchant, partner of H. Büring & Sobels, best known for their Quelltaler wines, made at "Spring Vale" in the Clare Valley wine region of South Australia.

He was educated at Prince Alfred College and Roseworthy Agricultural College, graduating dux in 1896, then studied in viticulture colleges in Geisenheim, Germany, and Montpellier, France.

On his return he worked in the family winery at Springvale, followed by Alex Prentice's at Rutherglen, Hans Irvine's at Great Western (later owned by Benno Seppelt), and from 1902 at Minchinbury, all known for their light white wines. In 1912 Frank Penfold Hyland purchased the Minchinbury winery from James Angus and Sons, and invited Buring to take over production. He had learned much about making sparkling wine by the Champagne method at Great Western, and put this to good use at Minchinbury, making theirs one of the finest in Australia, a reputation it retained while in the Penfolds stable.

Buring left Minchinbury in 1919 to pursue a career as winery consultant and to develop "Eden Glassie", an historic 376 acres (152 ha) property at Emu Plains on the Nepean River at the foot of the Blue Mountains, as a model winery. They built a house "Leonay" on the property and established a vineyard, making their first wine in 1923, and built a 19-hole golf course. He also grew asparagus and winter-flowering roses.

He was governing director and general manager of Lindeman wines from 1923 to 1931, when he founded Leo Buring Pty Ltd, established a warehouse and bottling plant at Redfern, and opened "Ye Olde Crusty Wine Cellar" at 255A George Street, Sydney in 1931, selling exclusively Australian wine. He was a director of H. Buring & Sobels Ltd from 1934 to 1960.

== Leo Buring wines ==
In 1944 Buring purchased the Orange Grove Winery in Tanunda and renamed it Chateau Leonay, later purchased by Ray Kidd, of Lindemans, along with its winemaker, John Vickery.

In 1951 Leo Buring (Holdings) Ltd purchased the Florita vineyard in Watervale (Clare Valley wine region) and replaced its vines with Pedro Ximenes and Palomino for sherry under the "Chateau Leonay" label.

The Leo Buring brand is now owned by Treasury Wine Estates, along with Lindemans, Penfolds, Wynns and other historic names, and became associated with high quality Rieslings.

== Recognition and representation ==
- Buring was on the council of the Royal Agricultural Society of New South Wales for most or all of the years 1926 to 1937.
- Buring was a member of the Viticultural Council from 1920 to 1939 and its president in 1930.
- In May 1935 he was elected to represent wineries and distilleries of New South Wales and Queensland on the Commonwealth Government's Wine Overseas Marketing Board, created by the Wine Overseas Marketing Act of 1929–1930.
- He was a longtime member of the New South Wales branch of the Australian Wine Producers' Association and their delegate to the Federal Viticultural Council of Australia in 1938.
- He was a councillor of the Blue Mountains Shire 1937–1944.
- He represented New South Wales and Queensland on the Australian Wine Overseas Marketing Board in 1929–1936.
- He was honorary treasurer of the International Society of Australia 1936–1938.
- Buring and his brother Rudi each established a trust fund for a gold medal to be presented each year at Roseworthy College — his went to the dux of the diploma of oenology. Rudi took over funding of the prize for the dux of the second-year course, naming it the "H. Buring prize in viticulture", in memory of their father, Hermann Büring (died 1919).

== Family ==
Buring married Ida Agatha "Nay" Sobels, daughter of his father's business partner, on 21 May 1902. They had no children. Their golden wedding anniversary was celebrated at the George Street cellar.

He died on 29 September 1961 at Penrith, New South Wales.
