= Phebe Watson =

(1876–1964) educationist and women's leader

- Born: 23 May 1876; Adelaide
- Died: 19 September 1964; Glengowrie
- Occupation: Education activist

Phebe Naomi Watson MBE (23 May 1876 – 19 September 1964) was a South Australian teacher and educator, active in securing better conditions for women teachers.

== History ==
Phebe Watson was born in Princess Street, near Angas Street, Adelaide, the eldest daughter of Edward Watson (c. 1846 – 27 February 1884) and his wife, Sarah Jane Watson, née Goldsmith (c. 1852 – 19 June 1927). Phebe was educated at a private school, then enrolled at the Grote Street Public School, in order to sit for the monitor's examination to gain entrance to the Education Department. She served as a pupil teacher at Goodwood Public School, then in 1896 entered the training college, at that time under Andrew Scott. She taught briefly at Quorn under A. T. Darke, when her health broke down and she was forced temporarily to abandon her career. She resumed work at Mitcham, then Woodville School, where R. Miethke was the longtime headmaster. Then began a lifelong professional and personal relationship with his daughter Adelaide Miethke.

In February 1901 she was appointed a teacher's assistant under A. H. Neale. at Grote Street School, which specialised in training of pupil-teachers. In 1908 she became assistant at the Currie Street Observation School under J. Fairweather, with special responsibilities as Supervisor of Lodgings, then in 1916 head teacher of its model country school. She became mistress of method in 1921 and assumed full charge of training country teachers. In 1923 the whole of the Currie Street school was dedicated to training of country teachers with Phebe as head lecturer. She also served as warden of women teachers, giving practical advice on deportment, dress, manners and personal relationships, in which she, by example, set high standards. This position was formalized at the Teachers' College in 1926.

She retired from the Education Department in December 1936, and in 1946 moved to Brighton, Victoria, where she lived at 6 Stewart Street, Brighton Beach, returning to South Australia shortly before her death.

== Union activity ==
Phebe Watson was General Secretary from 1913 of the Women Teachers' Association, which became the Women Teachers' Progressive League in 1915; she continued in this role until 1923, when she received her transfer to the Teachers' College staff, and was appointed the League's Press Secretary. She was elected vice-president of the Public Teachers' Union in 1923, In 1937, some six hundred teachers, frustration at the inability of the Union to achieve anything like pay equality for women teachers, broke away from the Union to form the South Australian Women Teachers' Guild, and Phebe was elected its first president. (The following year, those women members of the Union who did not join the Guild formed the Women Teachers' Association.) She also edited the Guild's Chronicle, which she continued after her resignation as president in 1940.

== Other activities ==
She was a member of the Adelaide Lyceum Club from 1923 and Hon. Treasurer, National Council of Women in 1924. She served as vice-president of the Adelaide Women's Club. She was on the executive committee of the National Council of Women and its vice-president from 1936 to 1941. She was active with the Girl Guides, and a Guide Commissioner from 1933 to 1936. She was a temperance advocate and an active member of the Ladies Harbour Lights Guild, an adjunct to Missions to Seamen. She contributed book reviews to the Teachers' Journal and a regular column dedicated to pupil teachers from the country. She was a foundation member of the Adelaide Repertory Theatre and a fine singer, a light soprano. She was an active organiser with the Women's Centenary Committee in the year leading up to the SA Centenary celebrations of 1936, and was largely responsible for A Book of South Australia – Women in the First Hundred Years. In many of these activities she served as "right-hand-man" to her friend and mentor Adelaide Miethke. During World War II she served as organiser of Women's Voluntary Services in South Australia, and the Women's Voluntary National Register. She also played an occasional game of golf.

== Recognition ==
She was appointed MBE in January 1937.

== Family ==
Benjamin Watson (c. 1817 – 14 January 1905) arrived in SA around 1850. His children included:

- Phoebe Watson (c. 1841 – 4 July 1893) died at Princess Street, Adelaide
- Joseph Watson (c. 1843 – 24 December 1888) died of heatstroke at Wilcannia
- Edward Watson (c. 1846 – 27 February 1884) married Sarah Goldsmith (c. 1852 – 20 June 1927) on 20 March 1871, lived at Princess Street, died at 344 South Terrace; all four of his children spent much of their adult lives at the South Terrace address. Only Walter married.

- Phebe Naomi Watson (23 May 1876 – 19 September 1964)
- Nell Watson ( – 8 March 1950)
- Walter Alan Watson ( – 9 September 1945) married Lavinia Mary "Vinnie" Stenning (c. 1877 – 5 March 1914) on 21 September 1901. She killed herself by drinking phenol disinfectant.
- Benjamin Clayton "Ben" Watson (c. 1884 – 28 June 1946)

- H. Watson with Waterworks department
- Edith Mary Watson (c. 1859 – 22 July 1927) trained as a nurse, married Frederick James Wamsley (c. 1866 – 13 June 1901) of St. Kilda, Victoria on 12 June 1889, lived in Elwood, Victoria, then Blackburn, Victoria. After his death she returned with her two children to Princess Street, Adelaide.

- Florence Maude Lucy Wamsley (c. 1893 – 30 August 1973) married John Leonard Eustace (c. 1889 – 16 July 1974) on 8 April 1914. He endowed the University of Adelaide Dental School to fund the J. L. Eustace Travelling Awards."The J. L. Eustace Travelling Awards" (PDF). University of Adelaide.
- Reginald Allenby Wamsley (c. 1895 – 19 October 1982) married Dorothy Edith (c. 1897 – 28 February 1989) lived in Barmera
