= Hermann Mucke (bioscientist) =

Austrian scientist

Hermann A. M. Mucke (born 4 September 1955) is an Austrian bioscientist with a peer-review publishing record in the fields of molecular biology, neuropsychiatry, cardiology and ophthalmology, mostly from the perspective of drug development. He is also a management consultant and entrepreneur working and publishing in biopharmaceutical strategic knowledge management, intellectual property management, and life science technology assessment.

== Academic career ==
Hermann Mucke attended the University of Vienna where he obtained his master and Ph.D. degrees in biochemistry. This earliest plant molecular biology phase of Mucke's work concerned the characterization and partial sequencing of the Cyanophora cyanelle genome, believed to resemble early stages of chloroplast evolution according to the endosymbiotic theory.

== Industry research executive ==
After leaving the university Mucke became executive director of research and development at an Austrian pharmaceutical company. He developed an indirect immunofluorescence assay for the detection of antibodies to the human immunodeficiency virus in human body fluids which was approved under the name Fluorognost(TM) HIV-1 by the U.S. FDA approval on 5 February 1992. A human T-lymphotropic virus antibody test, developed by Mucke's team but never marketed, served to demonstrate the first evidence of retrovirus-like serological reactivity in patients with the myelodysplastic syndrome, a finding that meanwhile has been corroborated on the genomic level.

In 1994 Mucke developed a new research focus in neuropsychiatry, initially with a focus on Alzheimer's disease and related neurodegenerative diseases. He directed an R&D program for galantamine derivatives. Soon thereafter he began to cooperate with various pharmaceutical intelligence providers and publishers in the United States and the United Kingdom, both as an author and as a contributing editor.

== Industry advisor and publisher ==
In 2000, Mucke resigned his executive function in the pharmaceutical industry to set up his own consulting enterprise. Since then, he has been an independent scientific advisor to life science companies and a prolific author of market and technology reports. He continues to publish his own original scientific research and commissioned reviews both in commercial and open access peer-review journals. His most recent papers demonstrate a systematic utilization of patent documents as a source of information in science, technology, and market research in the fields of ophthalmology, renal and cardiorespiratory medicine, especially pulmonary hypertension, and endothelin receptor antagonists.

By 2009 Hermann Mucke had authored or co-authored about 50 peer reviewed original research papers and invited reviews, in addition to dozens of drug evaluations. He is also a coinventor on several patent families which concern themselves with the pharmacotherapy of alcohol abuse, nicotine dependence, and depression.

Hermann Mucke is Patent Editor at the Thomson Reuters journal, Current Opinion in Investigational Drugs and an advisor to the Antiviral Spot of Excellence Vienna (ASPEX). He is frequently interviewed by media covering the pharmaceutical industry, mostly on issues concerning the streamlining of drug development through optimization of clinical trials, new approaches to the clinical trial process, or medical imaging.
