= Hermann Büring =

Australian winemaker (1846–1919)

Theodor Gustav Hermann Büring (1846 – 8 September 1919), commonly anglicized to "Herman" and "Buring", was an Australian wine merchant and vigneron.

== History ==
Büring was born in Berlin, son of Caroline Henriette Auguste Büring and Friedrich Adolph Büring (c. 1816 – 3 December 1856), engineer and brassfounder, who came to Australia aboard the Princess Luise in August 1849 and went into partnership with Ernst Fischer as brassfounders but died shortly after.

He was educated at the Deutsche Schule, of Freeman and Flinders streets, operated by A. Hansen 1851–1857 and R. C. Mitton's academy which operated from 1857 on Waymouth Street, later on Stephens Place. He worked in a country shop for nine years and three years in the Seppeltsfield distillery and another nine years in a store at Friedrichswalde. He returned to Adelaide and in 1879 opened a bakery and grocer's shop on the corner of Pirie and Ackland streets, gaining a storekeeper's colonial wine licence in 1882. In 1886 the bakery was advertised to let. Around this time he became sole agent for Spring Vale wines made by C. A. Sobels (Note: Carl August Sobels (1838–1923) son of winemaker Carl August Sobels and Johanna Wilhelmine Sobels, née Diemann, who arrived in South Australia with six sons and two daughters aboard Hermann von Beckerath from Bremen in December 1847, and settled at Watervale. On 5 November 1867 he married Meta Dohrenwendt (died 1929), who arrived in 1855; they had ten children.) at Springvale Estate (founded by Walter Watson Hughes, who died in 1887, and owned or managed by James McKinnon Richman, a prolific philanthropist, at Watervale. In 1890 they formed a partnership, H. Büring & Sobels, (Note: Büring and Sobels were brothers-in-law — Büring's son Leo married Sobels' daughter Ida Agatha in 1902.) to purchase the Springvale vineyards.

In 1897 they adopted the brand name Quellthaler ("from spring vale") for their light dry white wines, changed to Quelltaler in 1932 to overcome a frequent mispronunciation by non-German speakers. (Note: Quelltaler was sold to Melbourne wine merchants Nathan and Wyeth (owned by Remy Martin) in the seventies, then sold to Wolf Blass in the eighties, Mildara Blass in the nineties, then became "Annies Lane", a label of Treasury Wine Estates.)

Buring was a member of the council of the Vinegrowers' Association 1893–1929 and president in 1896.

He was a member of the Royal Agricultural and Horticultural Society's wine committee.

He was a member of the Phylloxera Board from its inception in 1900

He donated the T. C. H. Buring prize, awarded annually to a viticulture student at Roseworthy College.

== Family ==
Theodor Gustave Hermann Buring (1846 – 8 September 1919) married H. F. A. (Henrietta Friedrike Auguste) Lina Dohrenwendt (c. 1846 – 22 December 1934) on 22 April 1871. Their children include:

- (Adolph Wilhelm) Rudolph "Rudi" Buring (1872–), of Glen Osmond; partnership with H. C. Uhlmann

- Louisa Marie Lina Buring (died 1963) married Alfred William Abbott in 1907

- Hermann Paul Leopold "Leo" Buring (1876 – 29 September 1961), manager of the Minchinbury cellars, Rooty Hill, New South Wales. He married Ida Agatha Sobels on 21 May 1902.
- Caroline Meta Buring (1875 – 7 November 1955), accomplished contralto and singing teacher
- Edelgarde Adele Buring (1878 – 16 November 1948) lived with sister Meta at Flinders Street, Kent Town
- Blanka Buring (1881 – 9 June 1956), globe-trotting freelance journalist and social worker
