= Charlotte Grivell =

Australian singer

Charlotte Victoria Grivell (1901–1981) was a contralto singer in South Australia.

== History ==
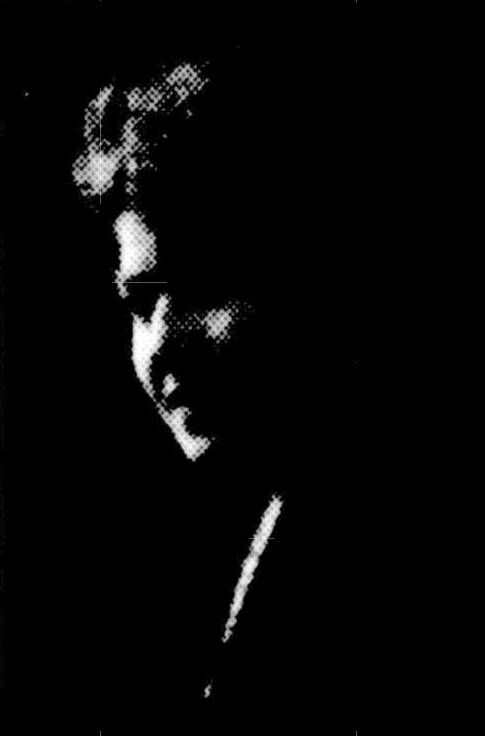
Charlotte Grivell in 1927

Grivell was a daughter of Caleb Grivell (1860–1935) and his wife Charlotte Grivell née Kidney (1857 – 18 November 1939) who married on 3 June 1882, and had a home "Orange Glen" in Payneham, South Australia.

She was educated at Highclere school, Norwood, and was a regular worshipper at Chalmers Church (later Scots Church) on North Terrace. With a vocal range of three octaves, and variously described as mezzo soprano and contralto, she was trained entirely by her brother Sable, but later took lessons from H. Winsloe Hall. She was for many years the soloist for the church choir and was also instructor for the church Gymnasts Club.

In 1923 she won the Elder Overseas Scholarship, which entitled her to a course of tuition at the Royal College of Music, London. The prize proved to be a poisoned chalice for many winners, as the cost of living in the Great Wen for three years' was not included, and beyond the means of most families. Fund-raising concerts were organised by supporters. She left for London by the ship Berrima on 12 July 1924, accompanied by Ariel Shearer, who was a full fee-paying student. She had accommodation in Kensington for the first year, and Kent thereafter, to save on expenses and allow greater privacy for practising. Her vocal coaches were Walter Johnstone-Douglas and Amherst Webber, of the De Reske School. She returned in 1927 by the Ceramic. It is likely that one consequence of her life in London was the realisation that she could never achieve the top tier of performers, and henceforth her stage appearances were in touring parties with Sable Grivell and his accompanist Elsie Woolley, private and society performances and so on. She appeared on stage with Ariel Shearer on many occasions; they were jointly appointed choral liaison commissioners for Girl Guides in South Australia. She led the Girl Guides choir that farewelled Lady Hore-Ruthven in 1934.

== Other interests ==
Grivell was an accomplished equestrian, and served as secretary to the riding club founded by Sir Lancelot Stirling in 1930.

She was a longtime member of Adelaide Women's Club and a popular entertainer at their social functions.

== Family ==
Grivell had four sisters and three brothers, including

- Clarence Henry Grivell (1887–1961)
- Elsie May Grivell (1889–1958) married John A. Munro (died 1952) in 1919
- Dorothea Grivell (1891–1969)
- Sable Ansley Robert Grivell (1893–1975), baritone vocalist. He married Elsie Constance Woolley on 10 December 1924. Sable published several songs: "Abide with Me" and "Singing for You" (both 1920).
- Ivy Ellavin Grivell (1897– ) contralto, married Launcelot Hugh Evans in 1924 She was awarded the British Empire Medal in 1978.
