= Guli Hack =

South Australian pianist, singer and teacher

Gulielma "Guli" Hack ARCM (17 October 1867 – 2 August 1951) was a South Australian pianist, singer and teacher at the Elder Conservatorium, Adelaide.

== Biography ==
Hack was born at Childers Street, North Adelaide, eldest daughter of Charles Hack (1842–1915) and Anne Brooks Hack, née Meyrick (1844–1929). She was a granddaughter of John Barton Hack.

Theirs was a musical family: her father was a tenor in several important choirs.

=== Student and teacher ===
Hack was in 1887 the winning candidate for the second Elder Overseas Scholarship to the Royal College of Music. She left by the SS Britannia on 14 January 1888. Among her tutors was Gustave García. She completed the three-year course successfully and was recognised by admission as ARCM, returning by the RMS Victoria in May 1891. She held a concert at the Town Hall on 17 June 1891 and in July joined the staff of I. G. Reimann and Cecil Sharp's Adelaide College of Music as the only woman singing teacher, and when in 1898 the college was merged into the Elder Conservatorium she was appointed to a similar position. She formed a women's choir which became part of the musical and social fabric of the Conservatorium. At least two of her students, Mary Trenna Corvan and Clara Kleinschmidt (famous as Clara Serena), were recipients of the same Elder Scholarship. Another, Gwladys Edwards, was a fee-paying student of the RCM. Hack retired from the Conservatorium in October 1909, on the eve of her marriage, and was given several valuable mementoes by staff and past students. Her successor at the Conservatorium was Harry Winsloe Hall (died 29 April 1936)

=== The Misses Hack ===
Her sister Ethel May Hack (1869–1947) was a contralto and piano accompanist, and the pair frequently appeared as "The Misses Hack" in concerts at the Adelaide Town Hall and elsewhere. As "The Misses Hack" Guli and Ethel lived at 58 South Terrace, Adelaide, teaching languages and music at their own school on Miller Street, North Unley, initially to small children. 1900–1902, then 1903–1906 as "Wayville Private School" at Rose Terrace, Wayville.

Her obituary described her as a valued member of Adelaide Lyceum Club for many years, who died at the age of 84, a well-loved and highly esteemed figure in Adelaide's music and art circles.

== Personal ==
On 5 March 1910, Hack married William Ashley Magarey (30 January 1868 – 18 October 1929), in 1901 one of her students at the Conservatorium. Magarey was well known as a football administrator, and remembered in the Magarey Medal. They had no children.

Ethel Hack married Bruce Malcolm on 9 January 1902.
