= The Great When =

2024 fantasy novel by British author Alan Moore

- 1st edition cover, illustrated by Nico Delort
- Author: Alan Moore
- Language: English
- Series: The Long London Quintet
- Genre: Fantasy
- Published: 1 October 2024
- Publisher: Bloomsbury Publishing
- Publication place: United Kingdom
- Media type: Print, digital
- Pages: 336
- ISBN: 978-1-526-64322-3
- Followed by: I Hear A New World

The Great When (Note: Known besides as The Great When: A Long London Novel) is the first of five intended fantasy novels in The Long London Quintet series by English author Alan Moore.

== Background ==
Author Alan Moore resolved that The Long London Quintet series would investigate the five closing decades of the twentieth century, that we might understand our own. The Great When is a wordplay on "the Great Wen", an epithet coined by English pamphleteer William Cobbett to belittle 19th-century London as a sebaceous cyst, or wen. Moore invented the name Dennis Knuckleyard while falling asleep and deemed it laughable and captivating, later on realising that nobody has ever had Knuckleyard as their patronym. He researched London from memory, the written works of Michael Moorcock and Iain Sinclair (to whom the book is dedicated), an archive devoted to Stoke Newington, and such period maps as London A–Z; owing to a want of walking strength, he did not see the streets in person as otherwise he would. The toughest part of writing, according to him, was merging this bygone geography with magic in order that readers feel a visceral, vicarious attachment. Italics were applied to signify an immediate sense of circumstantial displacement at entering the Great When, which Moore thought ought to be "a shattering experience" and purposefully antithetical to similar, yet harmless events in fantasy. He acknowledged comic book illustrator Kevin O'Neill for creating Ironfoot Jack Neave in The League of Extraordinary Gentlemen: Century 1969 and telling him the anecdote that granted Coffin Ada her hostility to haggling. The Friends of Arthur Machen literary society contributed insight into the Welsh author and mystic.

== Plot ==
In 1949, eighteen-year-old Dennis Knuckleyard is working at a second-hand bookshop in Shoreditch, London. The proprietor Ada Benson dispatches him to obtain some rare Arthur Machen books from a business near Charing Cross Road, but Dennis discovers it shut. He proceeds to the owner's flat in Berwick Street, where Ada's contact Flabby Harrison invites him up with some anxiety. Dennis learns that the assortment of goods contains one stray item, A London Walk by the Reverend Thomas Hampole. This prompts Flabby to lower his price, swaying Dennis before he delivers the lot back to the shop.

A troubled Ada demands that Dennis return A London Walk because she says it comes from another London and is not meant to exist. When Dennis reaches Berwick Street, he sees Flabby dead in an ambulance. He flees in fear and drinks until the evening, encountering the racing tipster Prince Monolulu in the pub. He decides then to dispose of the ill-fated artefact where he got it, but is pursued by two men until he escapes through a gate of sorts and enters an otherworldly area of London where the environment is attempting to eat him. Taken to safety by local Maurice Calendar, Dennis is advised to call on surrealist painter Austin Spare to get A London Walk to the City Heads, before dropping him off in Fleet Street proper. Prostitute Grace Shilling, who notices him weeping on the curb, shelters him out of curiosity.

Dennis travels into Brixton and, enquiring where Austin Spare lives, gets pointed towards the most dilapidated residence. He is let inside Austin's tiny basement flat and tells him of his predicament. Austin is willing to help and suggests that, for Dennis' welfare, he keep A London Walk with him in the meantime. Upon Dennis' re-entry into Grace's flat, he is met with three gangsters holding Grace hostage. Jack Spot, the boss, knows of the other London and means to negotiate with the god of villains in this realm. Dennis proposes that he arrange a gathering between them once the book is where it belongs; Jack agrees on the condition that Grace and Dennis' lives be collateral. The morning after, Dennis and Austin make their way into the other London, where they finally entrust the City Heads with A London Walk and schedule an audience at Arnold Circus on Jack's behalf.

In the physical state, Dennis meets with his mate Clive Amery to confide in him his recent ordeals, heading next to attend Jack's appointment. He runs into Clive sometime later, agreeing to reunite a week hence at a café called Franklin's. Meanwhile, Dennis sits down with journalist friend John McAllister and they broach the topic of murder victims, of which one was Kenneth Dolden, reminding Dennis of something he glimpsed long ago in Clive's notebook: Dolden, Green, Dorland & Lockart; he requests that John look into the others. Dennis takes Grace to an art gallery held by Austin at a Walworth Road bar. John is there too and informs Dennis that the names are connected to unsolved homicide cases, which unsettles him greatly. He meets Clive at Franklin's, but panics and rushes out, yet Clive follows him into the other London. Dennis accuses Clive of being a serial killer. Clive admits it and states that Dennis will be fated the same, continuing his pursuit. They race as far as the man-eating district, where Dennis manoeuvres it so that Clive gets devoured by a pavement alligator. Dennis slips away, finally restoring his life at Ada's bookshop.

== Subject matter ==
The Great When argues through the paradigm of emerging killers that the British psyche had been severely disturbed as a consequence of the Blitz, making England's future entirely uncertain. It observes that post-war Britain's treatment of the poor was sure to improve after so many were deployed in its defence. Moore uses the Great When to emphasise symbolism, explaining, "If you destroy the ideals that are supporting something, the physical thing itself will eventually wane and die".

== Reception ==
Sukhdev Sandhu, writing for The Guardian, likened Moore's writing to that of J. G. Ballard and Brian Catling's "fever-dream fictions" and William Blake and Iain Sinclair's mysticism. Conversely, Sandhu noted that the pacing suffered under the occasional exposition and Biblical interpretation.

Los Angeles Review of Books' Arbaz M. Khan saw the narrative as "an act of literary alchemy" which behoves its readers to question received reality and "revel in the shadow world of their own imaginations". He lauded Moore's use of magick and the occult to furnish his world with considerable depth of history, both whose integration with and separation from Long London was thought "masterfully" done. The prose was in Khan's opinion rewarding for the exact reason it could also be a toilsome read.

Sam Thielman of The New York Times wrote that The Great When "is paced like the kind of adventure story at which Moore so excelled in his comics scripts, and written in an urbane voice rich with jokes and memorable names and turns of phrase".

== TV adaptation ==
In late 2024, Playground Entertainment secured the rights to make the book into a television series. Having denounced past attempts at adapting his work, Moore reacted: "For the first time in my career, I’m genuinely excited and enthusiastic about a work of mine...one that I own, and believe could work marvelously in a different medium...being adapted for the screen".
