= Elder Overseas Scholarship =

The Elder Overseas Scholarship, sometimes referred to as the Elder Travelling Scholarship, is a triennial award to a South Australian (classical) musician, selected by competition from eligible candidates, to study at the Royal College of Music, London for three years.

== History ==
In 1882 a call was made by the newly established Royal College of Music to philanthropists around the world for a once-off donation of £3,000 to sponsor, perpetually, an eligible young musician to three years of tuition at the school. Mr (later Sir) W. J. Clarke of Melbourne was an early responder, creating the Clarke Scholarship, which he stipulated would be restricted to residents of the Colony of Victoria.

The editor of the South Australian Register greeted this donation in an article about the college, urging wealthy men of South Australia to follow suit, pointedly mentioning great musicians of the past whose wealthy patrons were remembered honorably as a result — Prince Esterhazy and Haydn, and Prince Lichnowski and Mozart and Beethoven were instanced.

In 1883 Sir Thomas Elder inaugurated the Elder Overseas Scholarship to the college, awarded through competition. The advertisement for the first competition read, in part:

ROYAL COLLEGE OF MUSIC, LONDON.
President: H.R.H. The Prince of Wales
Director: George Grove, Esq., DCL.
THE SOUTH AUSTRALIAN SCHOLARSHIP, Tenable for three years, Including Free Musical Education. Board and Residence at the College, founded by Sir Thomas Elder.
Open for competition to Natives of South Australia, according to certain regulations and conditions to be obtained on application.
1. Pianists — Male and Female, age not to exceed 18
2. Vocalists — Male, age 19 to 24; Female, 16 to 21
3. Violinists — Male and Female, age not to exceed 15
4. Organists — Male and Female, age not to exceed 18
Examiners Cecil J. Sharp, Hermann T. Schrader and Charles H. Compton

Minimum standards of competence set by the College, and on which the examinations were based, were highly prescriptive, and included test pieces. Of the five finalists, (Note: Others were Marjorie Beeby (later taught in Sydney), E. Frances Holman (later of Western Australia), Franziska Püttmann (in 1891 married John G. Kelly), and John Millard Dunn (piano and organ). Judges were Cecil J. Sharp, Hermann T. Schrader and Charles Henry Compton.) Otto Fischer was considered, though less schooled, to have the greatest natural talent, and was consequently awarded the scholarship.

== Costs ==
The scholarship did not include some necessary expenses, which should have been foreseen. Travel to England and return, and cab, bus, and train fares to performances, extra tuition (languages especially), and cost of a decent suit or gown (an essential for stage performances), all belied the promise of a great musical education for talented children of poorer families. In truth, as one cynic (or realist) wrote,

It is not merely the voice that carries a stager to the top of the tree. First comes money, much money; then brains enough to make most use of it; and lastly, as little conscience as possible . . . To all except a rare genius the only thing a young musician or vocalist can hope for in England is to gain as much as possible by study while money lasts; to educate oneself by listening to others, so long as there's money left; to battle hard for a few engagements, such as singing at soirees and small concerts; to earn a little money; to live as cheaply but genteelly as possible; to save money; and to go without meals, if necessary, to dress as well as money will permit, for the concert platform. (Note: A novel solution was found by Clara Kleinschmidt's supporters: they floated the "Serena Trust Fund Ltd", raising £1,000 in debentures to be repaid over ten years, with the prospect of a profit if she were to prove a success.)

There was however no mention in the Royal College's offer that "board and accommodation" was provided in term time only. In the holidays a British student could return home, but for Otto Fischer it was a significant added expense. Elder could have brought the lawyers in, but in this case, he simply stumped up the cash.

Another problem came to light when Koeppen Porter injured her hand and had to drop out. The college was still receiving interest on Elder's endowment, but providing no service, and profited thereby, and a local student may have taken her place. Sir W. J. Clarke, the businessman who funded a similar scholarship in Victoria, had stipulated that income from his endowment should only be used to benefit Victorian students, so was in a better position.

== Winners ==
- 1883 Otto Fischer, baritone
- 1887 Gulielma Hack, aka Guli Hack, pianoforte; completed the course and was admitted ARCM
- 1891 A(delaide) Koeppen Porter, pianoforte; dropped out in 1893 after losing the use of two fingers.
- 1894 (Henry Mortimer) Wallage Kennedy, tenor; stayed an extra year, never returned to Australia
- 1897 Mary Trenna Corvan pianoforte; returned to Hobart, where she taught, left for England 1920
- 1902 Gwendoline Dorothy Pelly, violin; passed ARCM, returned to South Australia
- 1905 Hooper Brewster Jones, pianoforte; Gwen Chaplin was proxime accessit.
- 1908 Clara Kleinschmidt, aka Clara Serena ARCM She was an aunt of Brenton Langbein.
- 1912 Kathleen Mary O'Dea (born 1894), soprano; had a career in Europe
- 1915 Merle Robertson, pianoforte, a student of William Silver
- 1919 Erica Rita Chaplin, violin (due to illness not taken; she died 1922). She was not a sister of Gwen Chaplin.
- 1923 due to accumulation of funds, two scholarships were awarded:

- 1923 Helena Fisher, violin and piano prodigy; (not taken)
- 1923 Lionel Albert John Bishop, pianoforte, student and protégé of William Silver;

- 1924 Charlotte Grivell, contralto, sister of Sable Grivell; Her friend Ariel Shearer was a paying student.
- 1925 Richard Charles Watson, basso; later in Gilbert and Sullivan.
- 1928 Ruth Winifred Naylor, soprano; remained in London
- 1931 Miriam Beatrice Hyde, pianoforte; extended study by one year.
- 1935 (Thelma) Joyce Sumner, pianoforte;

None awarded during WWII

- 1946 James C. Govenlock, organist;
- 1949 Louise St Clair Hakendorf, violin;
- 1951 Peggy Fearn, singer;
- 1954 Kathryn Schramm, pianoforte;
- 1961 Janice Hearn, soprano;
- 1977 Heather Bills, 'cello;
