= Otto Fischer Sobell =

Australian operatic singer

Otto Fischer Sobell, born Otto Fischer (2 May 1862 – 14 January 1934) was an Australian operatic singer, noted for Wagnerian roles.

== History ==
Sobell's father George Friedrich Fischer (c. 1822 or 1828 – 9 February 1882) emigrated to South Australia aboard the ship Louise, arriving 26 March 1849, and was soon involved in the city's musical scene, performing with Frederick and Albert Seyler, who arrived aboard Alfred in December 1848. George was co-owner with Robert Wiener (died 1878) of a coffee bar on Rundle Street, where the Adelaide Liedertafel, was formed. Fischer and Wiener were often heard singing together, Fischer also on piano. After the coffee shop, Fischer and Wiener ran the Tanunda Hotel to 1870, then Fischer had the National Hotel on Pirie Street 1871–72, the Hamburg (later Oriental) on the Gawler Place/Rundle Street corner 1872–73, and the Pier Hotel, Glenelg 1873–74. Destitute, he then left for Melbourne, where he died at the Hobsons Bay railway station, following a fall.

Sobell was born Otto Fischer in Tanunda, South Australia, the son of George Friedrich Fischer and his second wife Emma Caroline Antoinette Fischer, née Sobels (married 5 April 1855). He was a brother of Minna Fischer, a singer of renown. He briefly sang baritone with Fanny Simonsen's opera troupe, but later trained as a tenor.

In 1883 Sir Thomas Elder inaugurated the Elder Overseas Scholarship to the newly-founded Royal College of Music, awarded through competition. Of the five finalists, (Note: Others were Marjorie Beeby (later taught in Sydney), E. Frances Holman (later of Western Australia), Franziska Püttmann (in 1891 married John G. Kelly), and John Millard Dunn (piano and organ). Judges were Cecil J. Sharp, Hermann T. Schrader and Charles Henry Compton. W. A. Cawthorne was involved in selecting the finalists, but appears to have absented himself from the final vote, to be replaced by Compton.) Fischer was considered, though less schooled, to have the greatest natural talent, and was consequently awarded the scholarship.

His first major success overseas was in 1887 as Hans Sachs in Die Meistersinger von Nürnberg under Hans Richter.

In 1890 he was contracted to the Wiesbaden Opera House for three years as heroic tenor to play the title roles in Tannhäuser and Lohengrin, and received excellent notices in the German press. He was praised for his perfect German pronunciation; he was fluent in about 14 European languages. Around this time he changed his surname, perhaps initially to Sobels, his mother's birth name, but ultimately to Sobell.

In 1893, at Frankfurt am Main, he married Agatha Scheper (born 30 December 1859) both were on the staff of Cecil Sharp's Hampstead Conservatoire of Music. His wife was a Dutch pianist of considerable wealth. He became an accomplished motorist, driving a 20 h.p. Daimler.

He sang Tannhäuser to the Elisabeth of Milka Ternina in 1901 to good notices.

He visited Australia in 1914, at the invitation of Professor George Marshall-Hall.

He returned to Australia, arriving in Sydney aboard Media in April 1915 as "Frank Sobell", with wife and son.

He became one of Melbourne's leading singing teachers and for many years was on the faculty of the Melbourne University Conservatorium. He died at South Yarra, Victoria.

== A review ==
Mr. Fischer Sobell, in my estimation, is one of the greatest singers and actors living. In the concert room his magnificent voice and finished art are always immensely effective. On the stage where these are reinforced by his fine talent for acting, the grandeur and beauty of his interpretations are beyond all praise. I have heard him sing many varied stvles of music at concerts, e.g., Schubert and Schumann lieder, Beethoven's Ninth Symphony, Wagner selections, etc.; I have heard and seen him in Wagner and other opera, and he has never missed bringing out all the possibilities of the music. He is one of the very few singers who can read and play the scores in which he takes part; and one always feels that besides knowing his own part he understands the music as a whole, and can help the other singers, instead of himself needing the help of the prompter and conductor.

== Family ==
Fischer married Mabel Burrows in Adelaide on 10 July 1889. They divorced in 1891. He married again, to Agatha Scheper in Frankfurt, on 5 April 1893. He married once more, to the (Petersham, NSW) pianist Viola (often Violet) Agnew in London, on 28 June 1913. His children include:

- Jack Fischer (4 May 1890 – )
- James Otto Sobell (6 April 1914 – ) known as a linguist
- (George) Hamish Sobell (20 January 1917 – )
