= Heinrich Schrader (sportsman) =

Australian sportsman

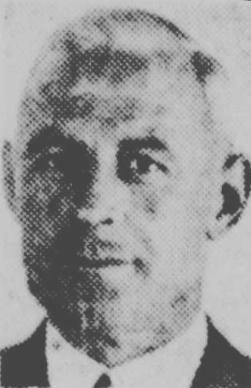

Personal information
- Full name: Heinrich Christian Schrader
- Born: 5 December 1893; East Prahran, Victoria
- Died: 10 June 1980 (aged 86); East Kew, Victoria
- Original team: Xavier College
- Height: 183 cm (6 ft 0 in)

Playing career^{1}
Years	Club	Games (Goals)
1914	University	13 (4)
- ^{1} Playing statistics correct to the end of 1914.

Heinrich Christian Schrader (5 December 1893 – 10 June 1980) was an Australian sportsman who played first-class cricket for Victoria and Australian rules football in the Victorian Football League (VFL) with University.

== Career ==
A Xavier College recruit, Schrader appeared in 13 games and kicked four goals for University in the 1914 VFL season but failed to play in a winning side all year.

Much later, in 1930, Schrader made his first-class cricket debut when he was picked as a right-arm medium pace bowler to take on Tasmania at the MCG. He took three wickets in the match and made 42 with the bat, despite coming in at number 11.

His second and only other first-class match came a year later against both the same opponents and on the same ground. Schrader took two wickets, including that of fellow dual VFL and cricket representative Laurie Nash.

He played for Prahran Cricket Club, and was made life member in 1938.

== Family ==
He was a son of musician Hermann T. Schrader, and served overseas during World War I as an Infantry Captain in the 1st AIF; briefly as Major. He married Violette Beatrice Kerr c. 1920.

== See also ==
- List of Victoria first-class cricketers
