= Prince Monolulu =

British horse racing tipster (1881–1965)

- Monolulu at a Grand National
- Born: Peter Carl Mackay; 26 October 1881; St Croix, Danish West Indies
- Died: 1 February 1965 (aged 83); London, England
- Occupation: Horse-racing tipster

Ras Prince Monolulu (26 October 1881 – 14 February 1965), whose real name was Peter Carl Mackay (or McKay), was a horse-racing tipster, and something of an institution on the British racing scene from the 1920s until the time of his death. He was particularly noticeable for his brightly coloured clothing; as a tipster, one of his best known phrases was the cry "I gotta horse!", which was subsequently the title of his memoirs.

== Family background and early life ==
Monolulu claimed to be a chief of the Falasha tribe of Abyssinia. In reality, he was born in St Croix, Danish West Indies, now part of the United States Virgin Islands. His baptism, as Peter Carl McKay, is noted in the records of the English Episcopal Church of the Danish West Indies. His father, whose name is not shown in the register, was William Henry McKay. His mother was Catherine Heyliger. His father and brothers were horse breeders, raisers and racers on St Croix.

According to his own account, he made his way from his birthplace to the African coast, where he was shanghaied on board a British ship: he styled himself a prince in the hope of receiving better treatment. His ship was shipwrecked on the Portuguese coast, from whence he made his way to New York. More plausibly, he travelled to New York via Puerto Rico. He had various jobs, on shore and at sea, and eventually reached London in 1902.

== Career as tipster ==
In 1903, Monolulu first went to The Derby and began to establish himself as a tipster. He adopted colourful robes, a plumed headdress, and the slogan "I've gotta horse!", sometimes alternating with "Black man for luck!". He continued to travel around Britain, and around Europe, for example visiting Saint Petersburg with an American "negro show". He was in Königsberg when World War I broke out, and was held in Ruhleben internment camp, near Berlin, for the duration of the war. He returned to London in 1919.

Great Yarmouth resident Maud Swallow remembered Prince Monolulu at Great Yarmouth Racecourse. "I thought I was placing a bet on a horse but my father told me afterwards that I had actually bought a tip from Monolulu instead of placing a bet".

Monolulu rose to prominence after picking out the horse Spion Kop in the 1920 Derby, which came in at the long odds of 100–6, and from which he personally made some £ 8,000, a vast amount of money at the time, equivalent to £ 400,000 in 2020.

== Personal life ==
Monolulu claimed to have been married six times. Five marriages are documented and reliable evidence exists for only three. He claimed to have been married first in a Jewish ceremony in Moscow in 1902, to a girl who was afterwards taken away by the police. His second claimed marriage was in a Catholic ceremony in 1903 to a German girl who was killed in a car accident.

More certain were his marriages to another German, Elizabeth Arnold, who accompanied him to England and whom he married in 1908, but who died in 1911; to Rhoda Carley in 1922, the marriage being dissolved in 1929; and to Nellie Adkins in 1931, a marriage which also broke down. In the 1950s he was romantically linked to an Austrian governess in London.

== Death ==
The biography of Jeffrey Bernard by Graham Lord relates Prince Monolulu's death in some detail. It describes how Bernard was working as a horse-racing journalist and visited Monolulu in the Middlesex Hospital to interview him. Bernard brought with him a box of Black Magic chocolates and offered Monolulu a "strawberry cream". Monolulu choked to death on it and Bernard bade him farewell.

== Media appearances ==
Monolulu frequently featured in newsreel broadcasts, and as a consequence was probably the best-known black man in Britain of the time. For example, in the 1939 newsreel London Carries On, Monolulu is shown encouraging a crowd of Londoners to wear their gas masks, changing his familiar saying from "I gotta horse!" to "I gotta gas mask to protect you!" The narrator comments that Monolulu had "evidently adapted himself to the new conditions."

In 1939, he appeared in a clip in the propaganda film by Alexander Korda, The Lion has Wings. Korda used him as an example of what Britain was, a nation at play and at ease with herself.

He appears briefly as himself throughout the 1930s, '40s and '50s in the films Wings of the Morning (1937), The Hundred Pound Window (1944), the 1952 film Derby Day, which is set around The Derby, Aunt Clara (1954), An Alligator Named Daisy (1955), The March Hare (1956), Make Mine a Million (1959) and The Criminal (1960).

In 1957, Monolulu appeared on the March 28th and April 4th episodes of Groucho Marx's quiz show You Bet Your Life.

== In popular culture ==
In the 1935 Will Hay film Dandy Dick, an extravagantly dressed black racing horse tipster appears. He is presumably inspired by Monolulu, to the extent that he is wrongly identified as playing the role by some websites.

Monolulu's name is referenced by the character Rigsby in the 1974 pilot episode of the UK comedy series Rising Damp, in humorous comparison to the new tenant Philip, who had stated he was the son of a chief.

Monolulu appears in Alan Moore's 2025 fantasy novel The Great When.

From 1991 until 2002, a pub in Maple Street, Fitzrovia was named The Prince Monolulu.

In 1956, a pub in Spencer Road, Hornsey, was named The Abyssinian after Prince Monolulu, also known as Peter Carl MacKay. It closed in 1965 and was demolished in 1971.

He appears as a character in the first two books of the Long London series, The Great When (2024) and I Hear a New World (2026), by Alan Moore.

A summary of his live and ability for storytelling is included in the book Erzählende Affen (meaning: homo narrans) by the German authors Samira El Ouassil and Friedemann Karig (2021) who call Monolulu the "uncrowned king of half-truths".

== Bibliography ==
- McConnell, Anita (2010) [First published 2004]. "MacKay, Peter Carl [called Ras Prince Monolulu] (1881–1965)". Oxford Dictionary of National Biography (online ed.). Oxford University Press. doi:10.1093/ref:odnb/76829. (subscription required)
- White, Sidney H. (1950). I Gotta Horse: the autobiography of Ras Prince Monolulu as told to Sidney H. White. London: Hurst & Blackett.
