= Second city of the United Kingdom =

City title in the United Kingdom

In the United Kingdom, the term "second city" is applied to the next most-important city after the capital and largest city of London. Traditionally it has been held by Birmingham, although the title has been disputed by the popular press in the 21st century with the city of Manchester, or with other candidates historically.

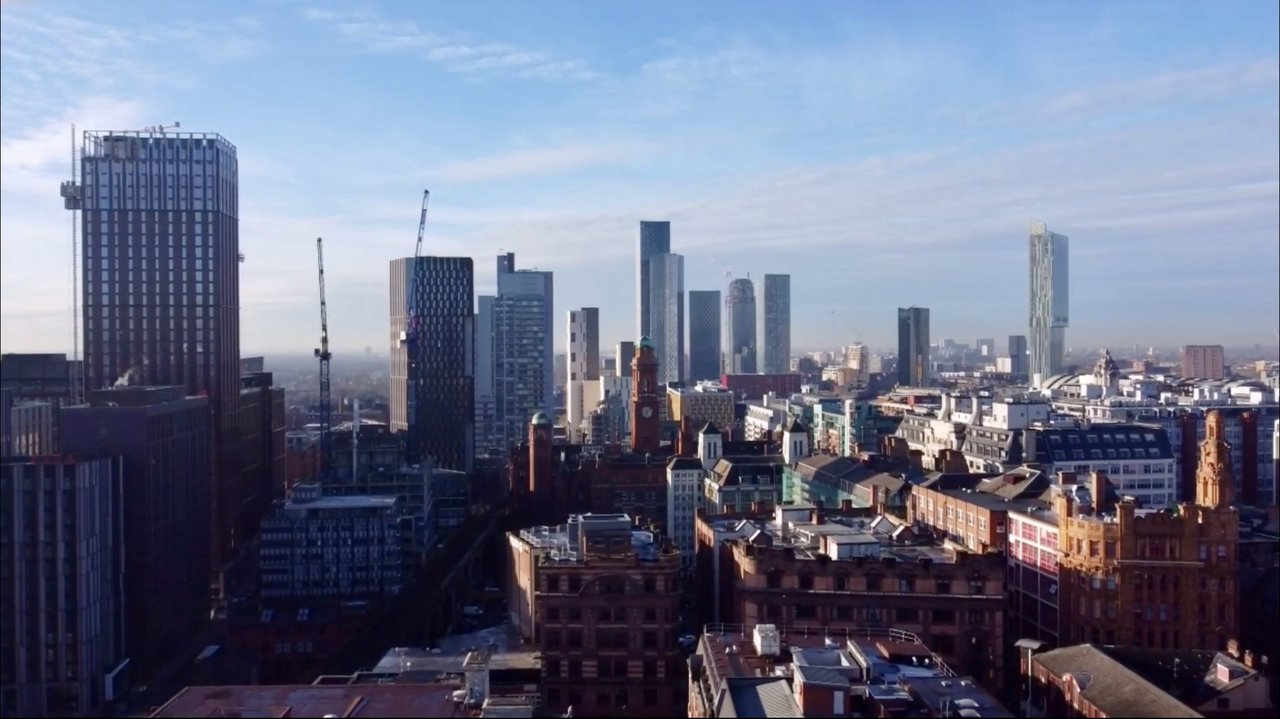
Manchester city centre in 2020

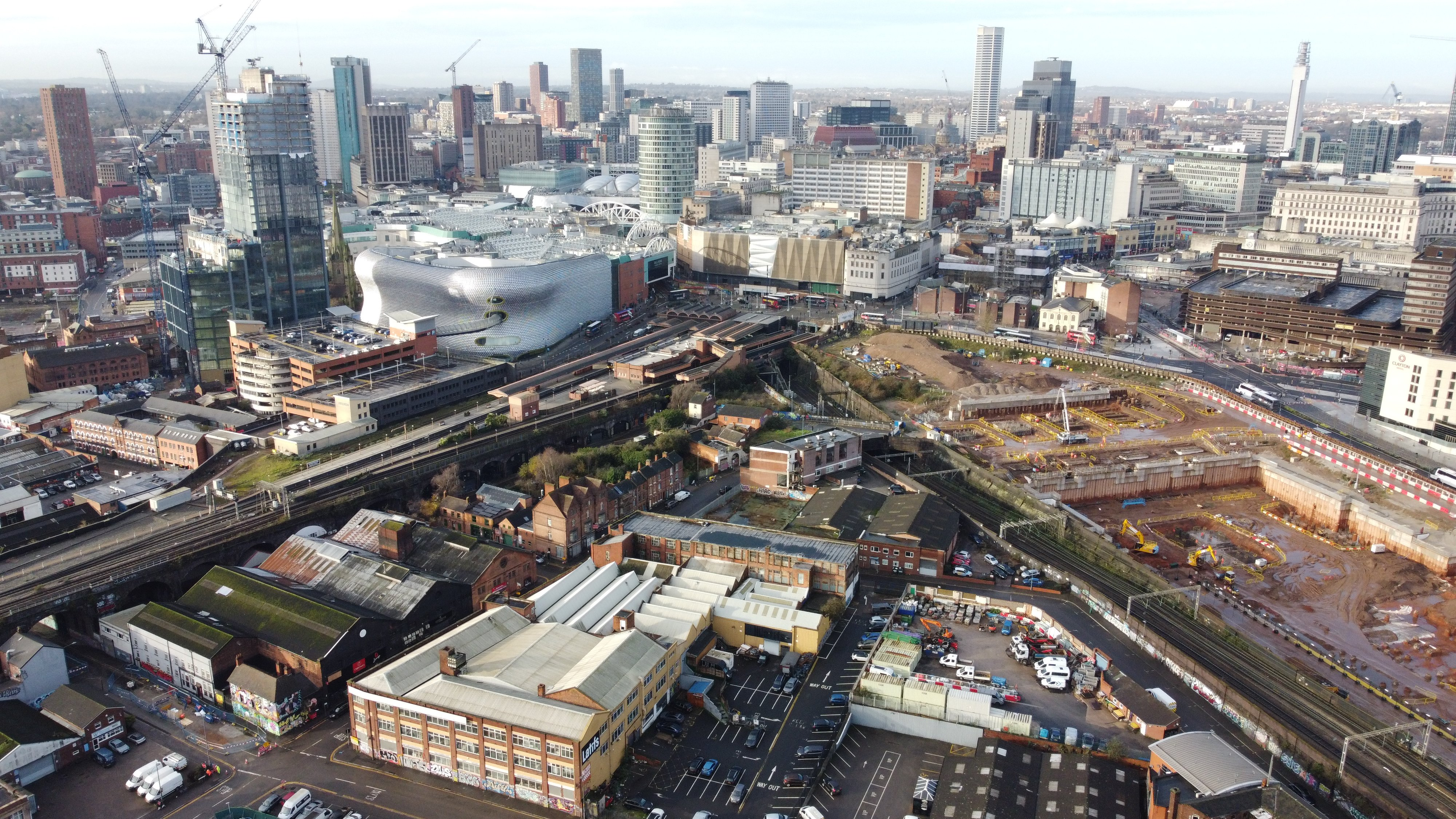
Birmingham city centre in December 2025

The United Kingdom has a primate city structure where London significantly surpasses other cities in size and importance and all other cities have much more in common with one another than with the capital, but various cities have held some claim to the title of second city through history. Eboracum (York), the northern capital of Britannia Inferior, would have been considered the second city by virtue of its prominence in Roman times. By the nineteenth century, the label "second city of the British Empire" had emerged and was widely applied to Dublin, the capital of Ireland. In later years, when broadened to "second city of the Empire" rather than "second city of the United Kingdom," the title was occasionally applied to Hong Kong, Calcutta, Bombay, or Melbourne. Dublin was eclipsed over the coming decades by several rapidly industrialising cities in Britain. Glasgow was sometimes described as the second city of the Empire during the Victorian era.

Currently, Manchester and Birmingham are both commonly referred to as the UK's second city. Edinburgh, Cardiff, and Belfast also have alternative claims due to their status as capital cities of the other countries of the United Kingdom: Scotland, Wales, and Northern Ireland respectively.

== History ==
York was named the second city in earlier centuries, by virtue of its prominence in Roman times as the northern capital, Eboracum, of the Roman province of Britannia Inferior.

The title Second City of the Empire or Second City of the British Empire was claimed by a number of cities in the 18th, 19th and early 20th centuries. Commercial trading city Liverpool was regarded as holding this title with its massive port, merchant fleet and world-wide trading links. Liverpool was constantly referred to as the New York of Europe. Glasgow (which continues to use the "second city" title as a marketing slogan), and (outside of Britain or Ireland) Calcutta (modern Kolkata) and Philadelphia were also claimed at various times to be second cities of the Empire.

Prior to the union with Scotland in 1707, from the English Civil War until the 18th century, Norwich was the second-largest city of the Kingdom of England, being a major trading centre, Britain's richest provincial city and county town of Norfolk, at that time the most populous county of England. Bristol was the second-wealthiest city in England in the 16th century; and by the 18th century, Bristol was often described as the second city of England. During the 19th century, claims were made for Manchester, Liverpool and York. By the early 19th century, Glasgow was frequently referred to as the second city; and during much of the 20th century it had a population of over one million, larger than that of Birmingham until the 1951 census. For example, the Official Census population for Glasgow was 0.784 million in April 1911; 1.034 million in April 1921; 1.088 million in April 1931 and 1.090 million in April 1951. However, slum clearance in the 1960s led to displacement of residents from the city centre to new communities located outside the city boundaries. This, together with local government reorganisation, resulted in the official population of Glasgow falling sharply. The Glasgow City Council area currently has a population of 600,000 although the surrounding conurbation of Greater Glasgow has a population of 1,199,629. In contrast, the population of the city of Birmingham has remained steady around the one million mark; its central population fell like Glasgow's, but the city boundaries were extended several times in the early 20th century. Occasional claims were made for Liverpool, Birmingham and Manchester.

== Modern points of view ==
Since the time of World War I, Birmingham has been generally considered the second city, although Manchester has become a serious contender for the title.

=== Population ===
Birmingham is the more populous city and is recognised as such by His Majesty's Government. However, confusion surrounding the correct way to define the two cities' populations, along with the publication of outdated, inaccurate, or estimated population statistics, has sometimes led to erroneous comparisons between them.

According to the 2021 United Kingdom census, the City of Birmingham is the most populous local government district (and therefore in terms of population actually the UK’s largest city-proper) with a population of 1.145 million — substantially larger than the City of Manchester, which at 552,000 is only the sixth-largest, behind Birmingham, Leeds, Glasgow, Bradford, and Sheffield.

However, municipal boundaries are problematic for comparing modern cities: many suburbs of Bristol, Birmingham, Glasgow, and Manchester fall outside city limits largely drawn up in Victorian times, and the surrounding conurbations and areas that can be considered part of each city are hard to define. Manchester is regarded as a particularly 'under-bounded' city, whose archaic boundaries no longer accurately reflect its true size. To reflect this, the City of Manchester is conflated with Greater Manchester, the metropolitan county and combined authority which includes the neighbouring City of Salford and eight other metropolitan boroughs that broadly define the conurbation. According to 2025 estimates, Greater Manchester had a total population of 2.86 million. The equivalent West Midlands metropolitan county, which Birmingham resides in, had a population of 2.92 million.

There are several drawbacks to this approach. The first is the arbitrary nature of the metropolitan county boundaries, which were drawn up in the early-1970s as administrative divisions and do not necessarily reflect the present state of either conurbation. A second drawback is the implication that each county is, in itself, homogeneous, thus ignoring the sensitivities of the distinct settlements which fall within the boundaries of the county but may not identify strongly with its principal city, for example the Black Country in the West Midlands, or Bolton in Greater Manchester. Relatedly, a third drawback is in the names of the counties themselves: Manchester has been able to leverage the name of its metropolitan county to build a cohesive "place brand", whereas Birmingham's comparative sphere of influence tends to be hidden within the West Midlands moniker.

In an attempt to circumvent the first of these drawbacks, the population of each city is sometimes taken to be the contiguous built-up urban area of their respective conurbations. According to a methodology defined by the Office for National Statistics in 2011, the Greater Manchester Built-up Area's population of 2.55 million is marginally bigger than that of the West Midlands conurbation, at 2.44 million. This disparity is explained by the area of green belt known as the Meriden Gap, which separates the City of Coventry from the rest of the West Midlands built-up area.

An alternative methodology, based around the concept of primary urban areas, is used by Centre for Cities to publish urban policy research. Primary urban areas are intended to allow economic and social comparisons between cities, using definitions less arbitrary than the administrative boundaries of local authorities, but avoiding some of the issues associated with agglomerating distinct urban settlements into single cities. According to the Centre for Cities Data Tool, Birmingham's population in 2020 was 2.56 million, marginally ahead of Manchester's 2.52 million.

At other times, the wider metropolitan areas of the two cities are considered. Compared directly, the Birmingham Metropolitan Area is the smaller of the two, with an estimated 2021 population of 4.34 million as opposed to Manchester's 7.42 million.

=== In the media ===
The media typically describes Birmingham as the second city.

Reporting on the Birmingham 2022 Commonwealth Games in July and August 2022, ten of the twelve nationally distributed daily newspapers in the United Kingdom published articles referring to Birmingham as the "second city" of either the United Kingdom, Britain or England: The Times, The Daily Telegraph, The i, The Guardian, The Independent, and The Daily Mirror. The same phrasing appeared in the freesheet press, including The Metro and City A.M., regional publications including The London Evening Standard, The Scottish Herald, The Northern Echo and The Yorkshire Post, special interest publications including The Voice, and a number of international publications including The New Zealand Herald, The Times Colonist and The National. Publications including the Financial Times and The Scotsman have also referred to Birmingham's second city status.

During the same period, the BBC published a "Brummies' guide to Birmingham and beyond" which contained the subheading "Something for everyone in the second city", while Sky published a piece discussing the concerns of "people who live in Britain's second city". Other national broadcasters whose websites have, at different times, referred to Birmingham as the second city include ITV, and Channel 4.

Since 2010, major international news providers including Reuters, the Associated Press, Agence France-Presse, Bloomberg News, CNN International, Al Jazeera and The New York Times Company have all referred to Birmingham as the second city of either Britain or England. In 2019, an article in The New York Times suggested that both Birmingham and Liverpool might lay claim to being England's cultural second city.

Travel and events publications including Lonely Planet, Rough Guides and Time Out refer to Birmingham as the second city.

=== Public opinion polls ===
As the second city is an unofficial title and one of subjective opinion, a number of polls have been conducted over the years. Despite Birmingham being viewed as the traditional second city, public polls have shown an slight preference for Manchester since 2000:

- A 2002 survey conducted by Ipsos MORI, commissioned by "Visit Manchester" (Manchester's tourism department), Manchester received the highest response for the category of second city at 34%, compared to Birmingham at 29%; and in the same poll, Manchester had the highest response for the category of third city with 27% of the vote, 6% more than the 21% for Birmingham. 85% of respondents put London as first City.
- A 2015 survey by YouGov showed that 30% thought Manchester was the second city, 20% thought Birmingham and 12% thought Edinburgh.
- A 2017 survey by BMG Research, commissioned by the Birmingham Mail, showed 38% preferred Manchester as the second city versus 36% for Birmingham. 16% choose Edinburgh with 10% for other cities. The opinion poll also found a stark generational divide with 44% of 18 to 24 year olds choosing Manchester as their preferred second city compared with only 19% who stated Birmingham and 25% of this age group also selecting Edinburgh over Birmingham. However, of those 65 and older, 40% preferred Birmingham and 38% preferred Manchester.
- A 2026 survey by YouGov found 34% of respondents selected Manchester, 30% selected Birmingham, and 12% selected Edinburgh, with no other city exceeding 5%. It also found significant generational and geographic divides. Among 18-24 year olds, 42% selected Manchester and 24% selected Birmingham, while among those aged 65 and over, 29% selected Manchester and 35% selected Birmingham. In Scotland, 36% considered Edinburgh to be Britain's second city, compared with 20% for Glasgow, 18% for Manchester, and 14% for Birmingham. Belief that Birmingham was the second city was concentrated around the West Midlands, whereas support for Manchester was more widespread across the North and South of England.

=== Ministerial statements ===
Although the government does not publish policy on the matter, ministers endorse Birmingham as the country's second city.

- In July 2022, Jacob Rees-Mogg, Minister of State for Brexit Opportunities and Government Efficiency, responded to a question about the city by stating: "Birmingham is the second city of the United Kingdom and London has got all the attention in recent decades but Birmingham has kept up, has been the next contender. And I think that's really important for balancing the United Kingdom, that Birmingham continues to be a strong, important and vibrant city as it is."
- In November 2016, Sajid Javid, then Secretary of State for Levelling Up, Housing and Communities, delivered a speech to Birmingham’s Asian Business Chamber of Commerce entitled: "A second city that's second to none", a claim he reiterated during his speech.
- In February 2015, then Prime Minister David Cameron stated "Birmingham is Britain's second city, it is a powerhouse." On 16 February 2016 he emphasised that "We recognise Birmingham’s status as Britain's second city". He repeated this claim on 16 March 2016 when he stated "Birmingham is the second city of our country" during Prime Minister's Questions.
- In February 2007, Digby Jones, Baron Jones of Birmingham, former Minister of State at the Department for Business, Enterprise and Regulatory Reform and the Foreign Office (former Director-General of the Confederation of British Industry (CBI) said "Birmingham is naturally the second-most important city in Britain after London because of where she is and how important she is as part of that crossroads".
- In March 2005, David Miliband, the former Secretary of State for Foreign and Commonwealth Affairs, and former Shadow Foreign Secretary said: "However, if you look at Birmingham, I think a lot of people would say that it's a city, Britain's second city..."

A notable exception was John Prescott, former Deputy Prime Minister and Member of Parliament for the constituency of Kingston upon Hull East, who concluded a conference speech in Manchester in 2007 with the words "...Birmingham – our second city", although this was later played down by his department, claiming they were made in a "light-hearted context". Prescott had previously declared Birmingham the second city while on a visit to the newly built Bullring Shopping Centre in 2003.

At different times, MPs representing constituencies in Manchester and Glasgow have spoken out in support of their respective cities' claims:

- Graham Stringer, MP for Blackley and Broughton, stated "Manchester has always been the second city after the capital, in many ways it is the first. Birmingham has never really been in the competition."
- Sandra White, former Scottish National Party MSP for Glasgow, claimed "Glasgow was always seen as the second city in the Empire, and Glasgow is still the second British city."

However, in 2007, Phil Woolas MP for the constituency of Oldham East and Saddleworth, former Minister of State for the Environment, appeared to concede the second city title to Birmingham, jokingly remarking: "And, of course, I, and colleagues in Manchester, am pleased to see its very sensible plans to relocate to Manchester – Britain's third city."

In 2021, Julian Knight, MP for Solihull, said that although people see Manchester as England's second city, "Birmingham is bigger, more diverse and frankly a more interesting place to be." He suggested that the Birmingham 2022 Commonwealth Games would cement Birmingham's place as England's second city.

== See also ==
- List of city nicknames in the United Kingdom
- List of towns and cities in England by historical population
