= Hermann T. Schrader =

Australian pianist, violinist and cellist

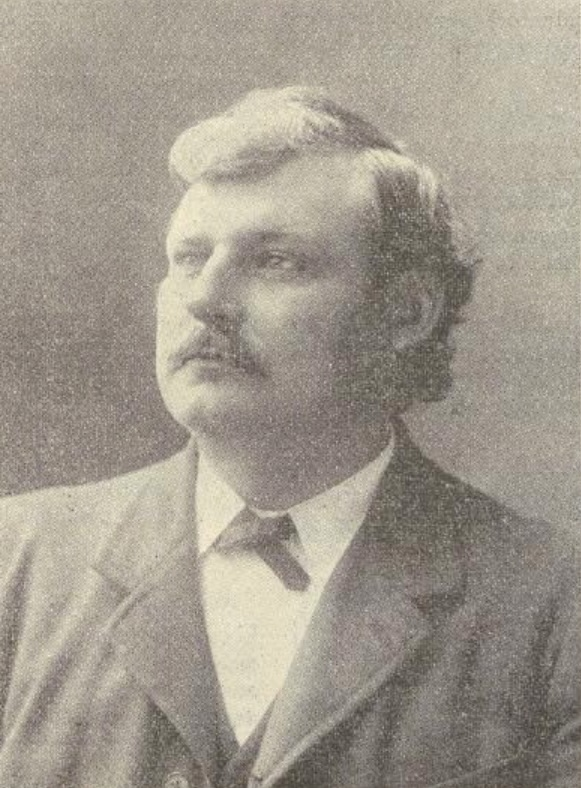
Schrader in 1897

Hermann Theodor Schrader (1860 – 9 July 1934) was a South Australian pianist, violinist and cellist, who had a later academic career in Victoria.

== History ==
Hermann was born in Adelaide, South Australia the second son of Heinrich Ludwig Christian Schrader (4 February 1832 – 21 February 1880) and his wife Wilhelmine "Menna" Schrader, née Oelmann (c. 1822–1910), who married in 1857. Hermann Schrader sen. arrived in Adelaide from Brunswick, Germany in 1857 and was from 1861 landlord of the Black Horse Hotel in Leigh Street, a singing teacher at the Deutsche Schule run by Leschen and Niehuus in Wakefield Street, and bandmaster with the Adelaide Regiment, Volunteer Force, then had his own private band. He played the cornet, contrabass tuba and cornopean. He also served on occasion as court interpreter.

Hermann was a student at the Deutsche Schule, Wakefield Street, followed by John Whinham's North Adelaide Grammar School. Around 1878 he left for Germany to study music under Hans von Bülow at the Königliche Musikschule in Munich, returning shortly after his father's early and unexpected death. He made his debut concert appearance in July 1880 at a reunion of the Liedertafel Society at the German Clubhouse in Pirie Street, followed in August by a "Monday Pops" concert in the Adelaide Town Hall, when he played one of Mendelssohn's Lieder ohne Worte and Schubert's Scherzo in F Minor, which were very well received. A month later he was the principal soloist at another Town Hall concert with support from Moritz Heuzenroeder, Minna Fischer and others. He and Heuzenroeder frequently shared the stage, usually on violin to Heuzenroeder's piano. In 1883 he was appointed University of Adelaide Examiner in Music with Cecil Sharp and Charles H. Compton, a board which, inter alia, selected Otto Fischer (later Otto Fischer Sobell) as recipient of the inaugural Elder Overseas Scholarship in Music.

He performed in 1881 and 1882 with the Adelaide String Quartet whose makeup varied, but revolved around John Hall on first violin and as leader; C. Barton or Chapman on 2nd violin; Frank Hailes or Hermann Schrader on viola; Frank K. M. Winterbottom on cello; and Hermann Schrader, Heuzenroeder, Jules Meilhan or W. R. Pybus on piano.

In February 1884 he left again on the Orient for continued studies in Leipzig returning in 1886. He was appointed pianist to the 1887 Adelaide Jubilee.

== Melbourne ==
In 1889 he fulfilled an engagement to play with the Melbourne Exhibition Orchestra,

Soon after, he was appointed professor of music at the Melbourne University Conservatorium, and before he left Adelaide a "Complimentary Farewell Concert" was held at the Town Hall in his honour.

He also took students at Geelong.

He taught music at Sacré Cœur School, Burke Road, Glen Iris

He was a member of a string quartet organisehttps://w.wiki/Mgngd by George Marshall-Hall.

He converted to Catholicism in 1927. He died on his way home after attending a concert.

It seems somehow fitting that Mr. Schrader should have been leaving a concert when Death slipped an arm under his and led him away. A man who had devoted his life to music might well ask that the last evening of his life be spent in listening to music.

== Compositions ==
- A march of his composition was played at the 1887 Jubilee.
- Song Wild wishes : written by Ethel M. Hewitt
- Song Arab love song dedicated "To May" : written by Francis Thompson (1859–1907)
- Song Bright was the Purple Dawning : written for Sacré Cœur
- Song Little blue pigeon : written by Eugene Field (1850–1895)
- Ave Maria : written for Xavier College 1930
- Mater Admirabilis a hymn, to words by Rev. M. J. Watson S.J.

== Family ==
Hermann was not the only child of Heinrich and Minna to become a musician: his brother Charles William Schrader (1870–1934), at one time manager for G. & R. Wills in Broken Hill, was an accomplished cornet player; his sister Anna Augusta Wilhelmina "Minna" Schrader married Frank Clausen; she was a well-known singer. Another brother, Arthur Frederick Schrader (1872–1922), was a violinist in Heinicke's Grand Orchestra. His eldest brother Heinrich Frederick Ludwig Schrader jr. (1858–1950) and another sister, Emilie Ottelie Clark (1866–1952) do not appear to have been musically inclined.

Hermann Schrader married widow Mary Elizabeth Patricia Dorney Walsh (c. 1862 – 16 November 1903) in 1896. They had a home "Wonga" at 50 Chatsworth road, East Prahran. Their children included:

- May Walsh Schrader (1 July 1887 – 21 April 1930) born in Ireland to William Walsh and Mary Elizabeth Dorney Walsh, served as nurse in World War I; never married.
- Herman Galway Schrader (c. February 1892 – 7 March 1948) married Mary Ethel Hunt on 15 February 1928. Secretary of Xavier College Old Scholars for many years.
- Heinrich Christian "Heine" "Henry" Schrader (5 December 1893 – 10 June 1980) married Violette Beatrice Kerr on 19 November 1919. Played for Prahran Cricket Club, made life member 1938.
- Herma Patricia Wilhelmina Schrader ( – ) never married, lived at "Wonga". She was a student at Sacré Coeur in 1914.
- Molleen Theodora Schrader (27 September 1901 – ) married Leon Lachal on 24 July 1930.

== Research documents ==
- The National Library of Australia has a collection of documents relating to H. T. Schrader.
