= The Criminal (1960 film) =

1960 British film by Joseph Losey

- Directed by: Joseph Losey
- Screenplay by: Alun Owen
- Story by: Jimmy Sangster (uncredited)
- Produced by: Jack Greenwood
- Starring: Stanley Baker; Sam Wanamaker; Grégoire Aslan; Margit Saad
- Cinematography: Robert Krasker
- Edited by: Reginald Mills
- Music by: John Dankworth
- Production company: Merton Park Studios
- Distributed by: Anglo-Amalgamated (UK)
- Release dates: August 28, 1960 (Edinburgh); October 28, 1960 (London)
- Running time: 97 minutes
- Country: United Kingdom
- Language: English
- Budget: £60,000

The Criminal (released in the United States as The Concrete Jungle) is a 1960 British neo-noir crime film directed by Joseph Losey and starring Stanley Baker, Sam Wanamaker, Grégoire Aslan, Jill Bennett, and Margit Saad. Baker plays Johnny Bannion, a recently paroled gangster who is sent back to prison after robbing a racetrack, with both the authorities and the criminal underworld looking for the money.

Alun Owen wrote the screenplay, from a story by an uncredited Jimmy Sangster. John Dankworth composed the musical score, with a title song sung by Cleo Laine. The ensemble supporting cast features Jill Bennett, Rupert Davies, Laurence Naismith, and Patrick Magee and Murray Melvin in their film debuts. The film, is noted for its harsh and violent portrayal of prison life which led it to be banned in several countries, including Finland and Ireland.

== Plot ==
Johnny Bannion is a career criminal with an entourage of minor criminals and fast girls. After being paroled from a three-year stint in prison, he begins planning his "comeback"–a racetrack heist for £40,000. He successfully plans and executes the robbery with the help of his partner, a well-connected American named Mike Carter. Unbeknownst to him, the racetrack is owned by another gangster. Word is spread of Bannion's responsibility, he's double crossed by his associates and he is sent back to prison, where he is a well-known figure.

In prison, Italian mob boss Frank Saffron takes Bannion under his wing and secures a move to a different cell block through claiming to be a Roman Catholic. He tells Bannion the outside world wants their £40,000 back but is prepared to give favours if he gets a cut. They make their plans whispering to each other during Sunday mass.

The death of an inmate triggers a prison riot. The other prison boss, the Irish O'Hara, is less sympathetic to Bannion. During the riot, Bannion opens the door to let the guards back in and wins favour of the prison governor. He is transferred to a low security prison for his assistance but is booed by fellow inmates as he leaves.

During the transfer, it is revealed that Bannion paid £40,000 for the riot and a "fast car". The car appears and drives the prison van off the road, rescuing Bannion. However, he has been double crossed. He is taken to a narrow boat where the criminals he robbed are waiting, also with his lover Suzanne as security. They flee, but Bannion is hit by a bullet as they escape. They reach a snowy field where Johnny shoots one of his three pursuers before being shot himself. He dies before being able to say where the money is.

== Cast ==
- Stanley Baker as Johnny Bannion
- Sam Wanamaker as Mike Carter
- Grégoire Aslan as Frank Saffron
- Margit Saad as Suzanne
- Jill Bennett as Maggie
- Rupert Davies as Edwards
- Laurence Naismith as Mr Town
- John Van Eyssen as Formby
- Noel Willman as Prison Governor
- Derek Francis as Priest
- Redmond Phillips as Prison Doctor
- Kenneth J. Warren as Clobber
- Patrick Magee as Barrows
- Robert Adams as Judas
- Kenneth Cope as Kelly
- Patrick Wymark as Sol
- Jack Rodney as Scout
- John Molloy as Snipe
- Brian Phelan as Pauly Larkin
- Paul Stassino as Alfredo Fanucci
- Jerold Wells as Warder Brown
- Tom Bell as Flynn
- Neil McCarthy as O'Hara
- Keith Smith as Hanson
- Nigel Green as Ted
- Tom Gerard as Quantock
- Larry Taylor as Charles
- Murray Melvin as Antlers
- Charles Lamb as Mr. Able
- Edward Judd as Young Warder

Uncredited

- Roy Dotrice as Dandy Nicholls
- Ronald Brittain as Kitchen Warder
- Tommy Eytle and Kenny Lynch as West Indian Prisoners
- Prince Monolulu as Himself

== Production ==
=== Writing ===
Joseph Losey said he was handed a ready-made script. "It was a concoction of all the prison films Hollywood ever made", he said. "Both Stanley Baker and I refused to work until they let us write our own script. Which is what we did." He says the producers wanted a sequence where the criminals rob a race track but he felt that had been done in Stanley Kubrick's The Killing (1956), so he filmed it taking place off screen.

According to Losey, the character Johnny Bannion was modelled on real-life Soho gangster Albert Dimes, whom Baker was acquainted with. Frank Saffron, the prison mob boss, was patterned after Charles Sabini.

=== Casting ===
The film was the debut for several of its actors, including Patrick Magee, Murray Melvin, Roy Dotrice, Neil McCarthy and Derek Francis.

=== Filming ===
Filming took place on-location in London, and at Merton Park and Shepperton Studios. The racecourse sequence was filmed at Hurst Park Racecourse. Notorious tipster Prince Monolulu makes a cameo appearance in the scene.

== Release ==
The film premiered at the Edinburgh International Film Festival on 28 August 1960, and was released theatrically in the UK on 28 October. Under the title The Concrete Jungle, it had a limited release in the United States in May 1962, but was “not shown at a major New York theatre.”

=== Home media ===
The film was released on Blu-Ray by boutique label Kino Lorber on 18 February 2020.

== Reception ==
=== Box office ===
According to Losey, the film was a commercial success. He said the film was initially banned in Ireland because so many of the prisoners were Irish Catholics. The film was reportedly very successful in Paris, with the Screenonline noting "The Criminal consolidated French cineastes' growing interest in Joseph Losey's work for its visual panache and sharp social commentary."

=== Initial critical response ===
A contemporary review in Variety called it "one of the toughest, most uncompromising of its kind", praising Losey's direction and Stanley Baker's performance.

=== Retrospective appraisal ===
Characterizing the film’s style as “vital and vulgar as ever,” critic Dan Callahan at Senses of Cinema offers this measured praise:

Losey’s command of atmosphere and his ability to build tension are outstanding here…The bursts of violence in The Criminal are orgasmic in their surety, in their explosive feeling of energy at last unleashed. Some scenes spill over the top, making an unconvincing mess, yet mournful soundtrack jazz and winter landscapes signal a darkening of Losey’s consciousness.

FilmInk described it as one of the most highly regarded crime films made by Anglo-Amalgamated.

Film historian Foster Hirsch described the film as a "'B movie prison melodrama redeemed by Losey’s skillful mise-en-scene."

== Themes ==
Foster Hirsch called the film "a naturalistic study of the way the environment both creates and entraps a criminal mentality."

Losey presents three major settings in the film: the penitentiary; Bannion’s apartment after his parole; and a desolate winter landscape where he’s hidden the heist money. None of these offer a refuge for the criminal. The first two domains appear as equivalents: the prison is merely the obverse of society at large, both of which impose repressive social hierarchies and inequities. The visual contrast of the final setting - a snow-covered countryside field - proves fatal:

[T]he whiteness of the landscape contains its own terror; it too is a threatening rather than nurturing environment, and it is here, against the icy, impersonal whiteness, that the criminal is killed.

== Sources ==
- Callahan, Dan. 2003. Losey, Joseph. Senses of Cinema, March 2003. Great Directors Issue 25.https://www.sensesofcinema.com/2003/greatdirectors/losey/#:~:text=The%20dominant%20themes%20of%20Losey's,love%20story%20in%20his%20films. Accessed 12 October, 2024.
- Hirsch, Foster. 1980. Joseph Losey. Twayne Publishers, Boston, Massachusetts. ISBN 0-8057-9257-0
- Palmer, James and Riley, Michael. 1993. The Films of Josef Losey. Cambridge University Press, Cambridge, England. ISBN 0-521-38386-2
- Sanjek, David. 2002. Cold, Cold Heart: Joseph Losey’s The Damned and the Compensations of Genre. Senses of Cinema, July 2002. Director: Joseph Losey Issue 21.https://www.sensesofcinema.com/2002/director-joseph-losey/losey_damned/ Accessed 10 October, 2024.
