= List of city and town nicknames in the United Kingdom =

This partial list of city and town nicknames in the United Kingdom compiles the aliases, sobriquets and slogans that cities and towns in the United Kingdom are known by (or have been known by historically), officially and unofficially, to locals, outsiders or their tourism boards or chambers of commerce. City nicknames can help in establishing a civic identity, helping outsiders recognize a community or attracting people to a community because of its nickname; promote civic pride; and build community unity.

Nicknames and slogans that successfully create a new community "ideology or myth" are also believed to have economic value. Their economic value is difficult to measure, but there are anecdotal reports of cities that have achieved substantial economic benefits by "branding" themselves by adopting new slogans.

Some unofficial nicknames are positive, while others are derisive. The unofficial nicknames listed here have been in use for a long time or have gained wide currency.

== A ==
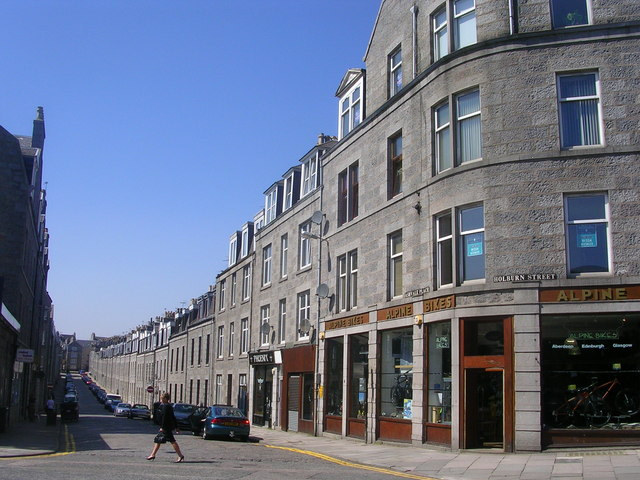
Granite is one of the principal materials used in the architecture of Aberdeen, to the extent that it has become known as "The Granite City"

- Aberdare
  - "Swît Byr-dɛ̄r (Gwentian Welsh), Sweet 'Berdare (English)" – A nickname remembered by the very old in the town, but no longer in general use. Popular in the late 1800s and early 1900s. Example of its use in 1916: "You do not hear a lot about us, but we are nevertheless doing our duty toward our King and country. I hope that I shall be spared to see Sweet 'Berdare once again. – I remain, B. J. Edwards. Sto. No. I. Mess, H.M.S. Colossus, c/o G.P.O. London."
- Aberdeen
  - "Energy Capital of Europe"
  - "Furryboots City" – a humorous rendering of the Doric, "far aboots?" ("Whereabouts?"), as in "Far aboots ye frae?" ("Whereabouts are you from?")
  - "The Granite City" – the most well-known, due to the copious use of local grey granite in the city's older buildings.
  - "Oil Capital of Europe" – there are numerous variants on this, such as "Oil Capital of Scotland" etc.
- Accrington
  - "Accy" – simple contraction of the name.

== B ==
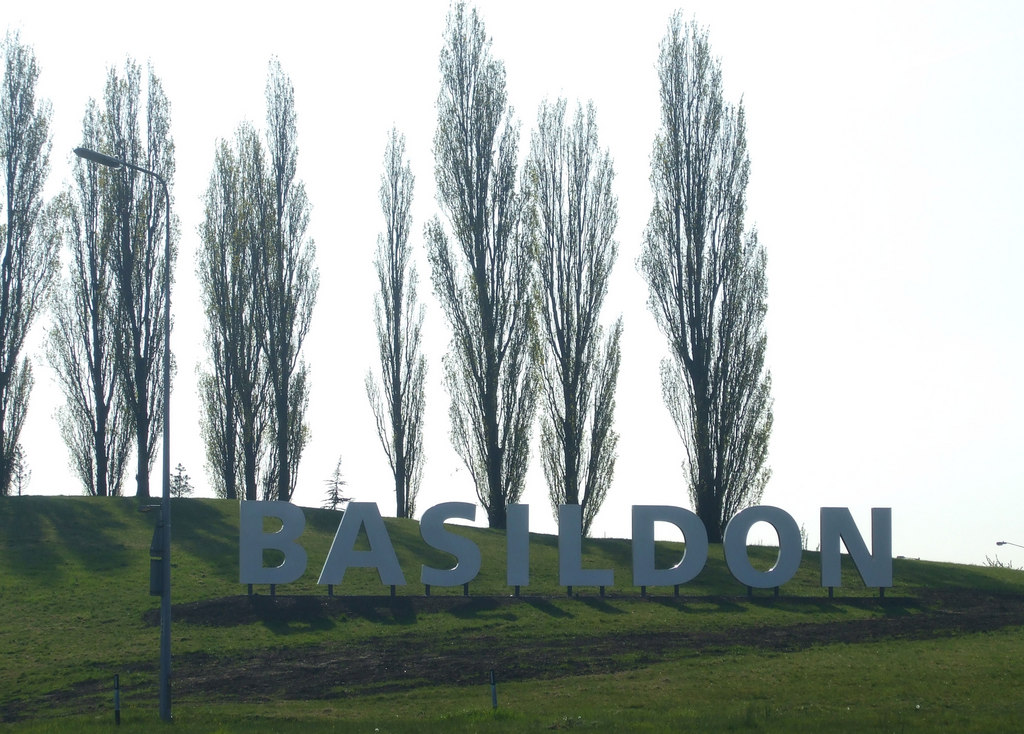
Basildon is called "Basilwood" or "Basil-wood" for a Hollywood-style road sign on the A127

- Basildon
  - "Bas Vegas" – derived from the town's festival leisure park, in reference to the American city of Las Vegas.
  - "Basilwood" or "Basil-wood" – derived from a Hollywood-style road sign for the town on the A127.
  - "Basildump" – commonly used by locals who disapprove of the town.
  - "Moscow on/down the Thames" or "Little Moscow on/down the Thames" - historic nickname for the town derived from its status as a left-wing, socialist stronghold for the Labour Party until the rise of Thatcherism in the 1980s.
- Bath, Somerset
  - "Aquae Sulis" – Latin name for the Roman baths, still used sometimes in modern day as an alternative name.
- Barnsley
  - "Tahn" or "Tarn" – derived from pronunciation of 'town' in the local dialect, although the term is often used with an increasing sense of irony given the relatively neutral accents of younger people in the town.
- Basingstoke
  - "Basingrad" – reference to a perceived resemblance of the town to the Stalinist-era architecture of similarly suffixed Soviet cities.
- Belfast
  - "Old Smoke" – reference to the observation that in the Victorian era, while much of Ireland (Dublin excepted) remained rural and agricultural, Belfast became the island's primary industrial city.
  - "Linenopolis" – a now largely defunct Victorian title given the city when it led the World's linen industry.
  - "Belshaft"
- Birmingham
  - "Brum" – shortened form of "Brummagem", a local form of the city's name. The derived term "Brummie" can refer both to the people of the area, and the local dialect and accent.
  - "City of a Thousand Trades" – with reference to the city's former industrial might.
  - "Venice of the North" – a name likening the city to Venice, Italy, in southern Europe, due to both having a large number of canals.
  - "Workshop of the world" – also a reference to the city's industrial heritage.
  - "Second City" – used by many traders, politicians, and is the popular name of the derby between the city's two football clubs, Aston Villa and Birmingham City
  - "The Pen Shop of the World" – Historical, in reference to Birmingham's huge pen trade in the 1800s.
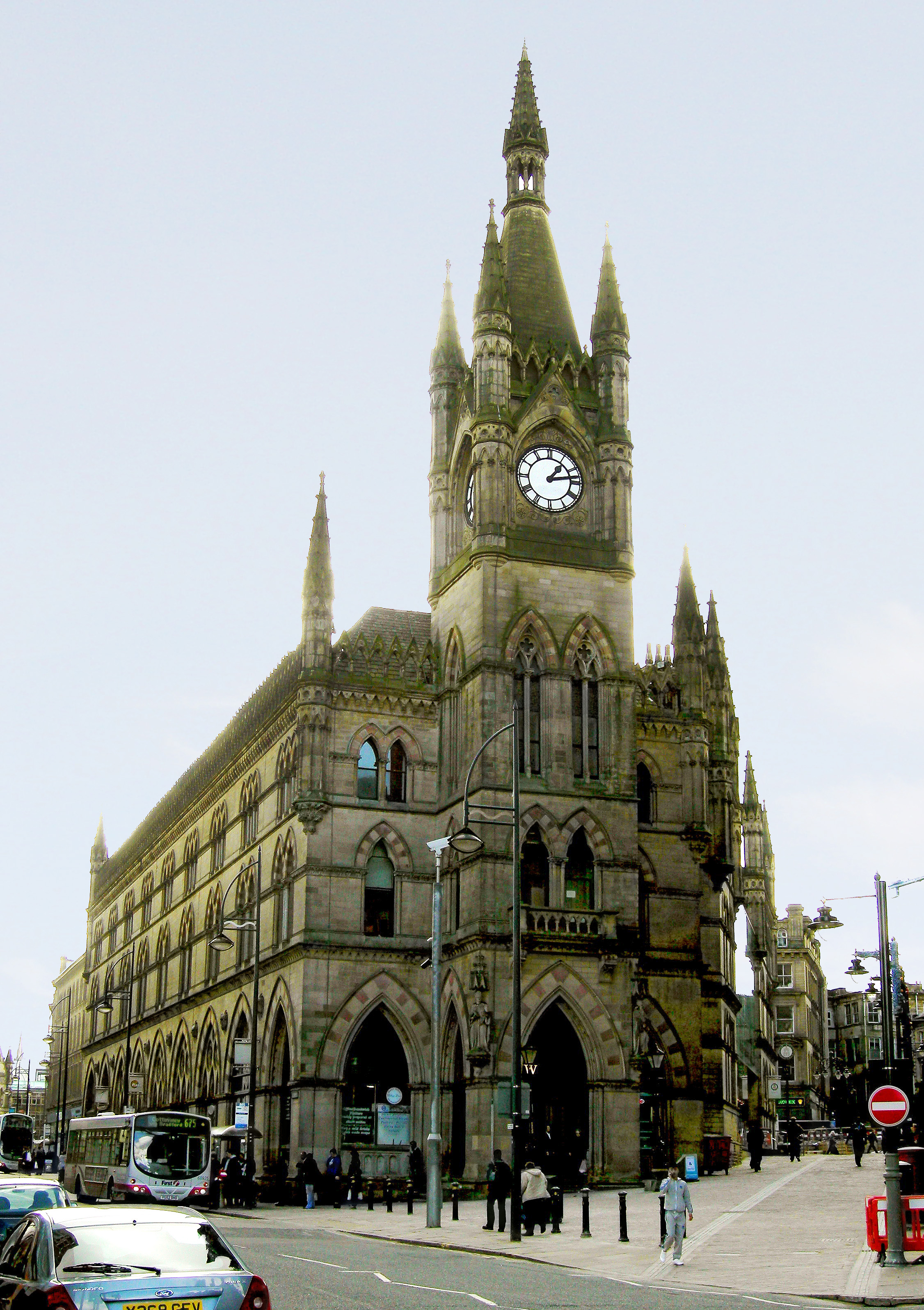
    The Wool Exchange, Bradford, reflecting the importance of the wool trade to the city
- Bognor Regis
  - "Little Poland" - Owing to Bognor Regis' large Polish and Eastern European population.
- Bracknell
  - "Cracknell" – denigratory reference to Bracknell's predominantly lower middle class population, many of whom are assumed to be drug dealers. However, there is no evidence to suggest that drug use is higher in Bracknell than in any other part of the country.
- Bradford
  - "Bratford" – the way "Bradford" is pronounced by some Bradfordians.
  - "Bradistan" – suffix -stan refers to the city's large Asian community, particularly from Pakistan. The nickname is used by white and Asian people alike, and came to many people's attention in the film East is East.
  - "Bruddersford" – name coined by J. B. Priestley for his fictional portrayals of Bradford.
  - "Curry Capital of Britain" or simply "Curry Capital" – a title gained by the city's rich history with curry. It won the Curry Capital of Britain (which ran from 2001 to 2016) a record seven times. It also hosts the World Curry Festival.
  - "Woolopolis" – reference to the Victorian era woolen industry in the city, in the style of Manchester's "Cottonopolis"
  - "Wool City" – same reason as above, as it was the former "Wool Capital of the World".
  - "Worstedopolis" – as above, but more frequently used.
  - "City of Film" or "Film City" – a title bestowed upon the city in 2009 when it became the first UNESCO City of Film. It has a long history with film and filmmaking, which started with inventors and pioneers of film in the late 19th and early 20th centuries. The city has many cinemas, and courses, festivals and other events to do with film. The city is often used as a location for film and TV productions, and is home to the National Science and Media Museum.
- Brighton and Hove
  - Brighton
    - "London-by-the-sea" - reference to the high number of Londoners who move to Brighton.
    - "The Queen of Watering Places" - owing to its perceived superiority as a seaside resort in Victorian times
    - "Skid Row-on-Sea"
  - Hove
    - "Hove actually" – imagined response distinguishing the area from Brighton.
- Bristol
  - "Bristle" or "Brizzle" – an unusual feature of the Bristol dialect, is the Bristol L (or terminal L), in which an L sound is appended to words.
  - The British Seattle

== C ==
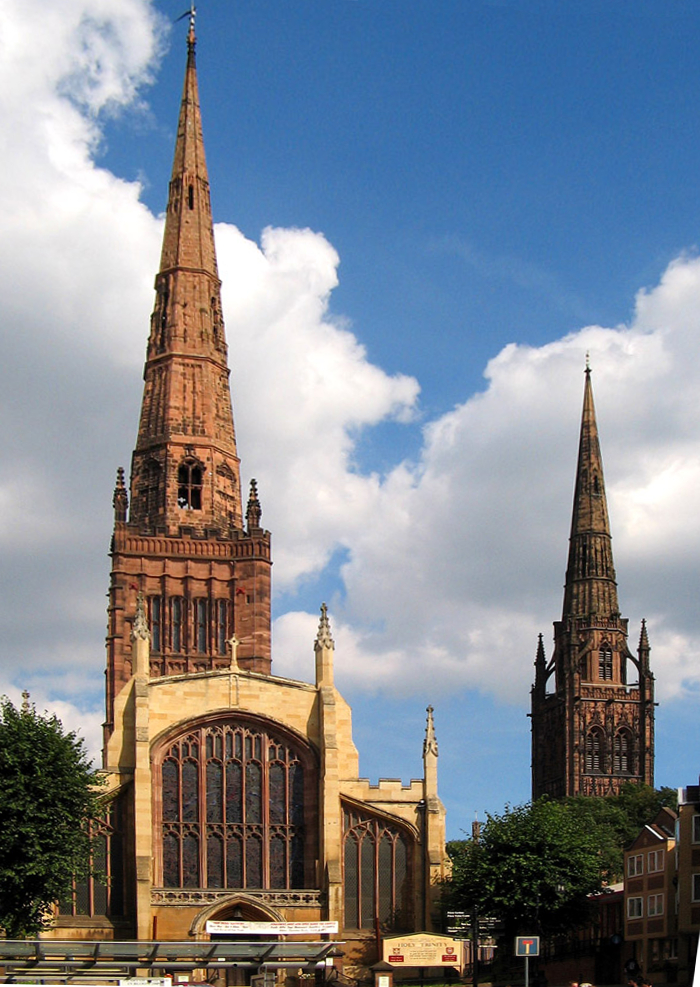
Two of the three spires of Coventry: Holy Trinity Church to the left, and the remains of the 14th Century St. Michael's Cathedral to the right

- Cambridge
  - "City of perspiring dreams" – by contrast with Oxford's nickname, "the city of dreaming spires". Coined by author and screenwriter Frederic Raphael in The Glittering Prizes. "Perspiring Dreams" was later the title of the Cambridge University Students' Union alternative prospectus.
  - "Silicon Fen" – often applied to Cambridge and the immediately surrounding region, because of the large number of high tech businesses in the area. The name alludes to similarities to Silicon Valley in California, and the city's location close to The Fens. In contrast to Scotland's Silicon Glen which relates to manufacturing.
  - "Cam"
- Cardiff
  - "Coalopolis" – Now fallen from use, but popular during the 19th and early 20th centuries when Cardiff experienced unusually rapid growth as a consequence of being the largest international exporter of coal.
  - "City of Arcades" – city has the highest concentration of Victorian, Edwardian and contemporary indoor shopping arcades in any British city – see List of shopping arcades in Cardiff.
  - "The 'Diff" – Developed from a shortening of the city's name.
- Chichester
  - "Chi" – shortened version of Chichester, pronounced 'Chy'.
- Chippenham
  - “Chips and Ham”
  - “Chip’numb”
- Coventry
  - "Cov" - abbreviation of Coventry.
  - "CoVegas"
  - "Britain's Detroit" – arising from its one-time status as the centre of UK car manufacturing; an appellation dating back to at least 1916.
  - "City of Peace and Reconciliation" – branding adopted from 2008 onwards, as part of the City of Sanctuary movement.
  - "City of three spires" – referring to the cathedral spire; Holy Trinity Church; and Christ Church's spire.
  - "Motor City" – as with "Britain's Detroit", an allusion to the city's motorcar industry.
  - "Poventry" - Portmanteau of poverty and Coventry - a denigratory reference to Coventry's societal deprivation, urban decay and uglification compared to other British cities.

== D ==
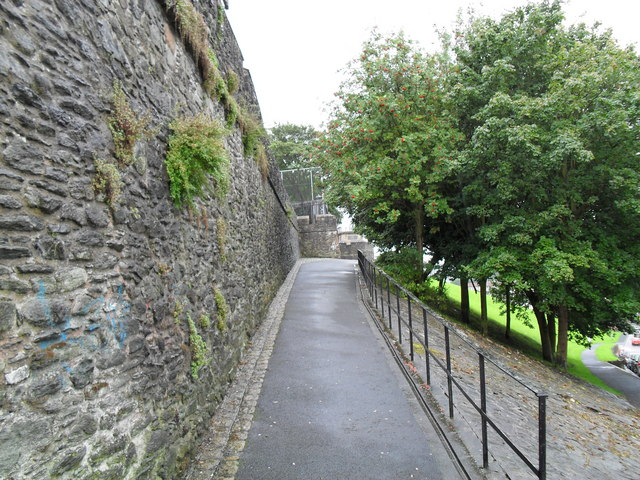
Part of the never-breached Walls of Derry, giving rise to the name "Maiden City"

- Derby
  - "Derbados" – portmanteau of Derby and Barbados
- Derry
  - "The Maiden City" – name allegedly attaches since the city's walls were never breached
  - "Stroke City" – referring to a normal form of presenting the two names of the city – Derry/Londonderry
- Doncaster
  - "Donny" – shortened version of Doncaster.
- Dumfries
  - "Queen of the South" - hence the name of the local football team
- Dundee
  - "City of Discovery" – name referring to the RSS Discovery, the sailing ship used by Robert Falcon Scott in his attempt to reach the South Pole – which was constructed in the city, and returned there in 1986.

== E ==
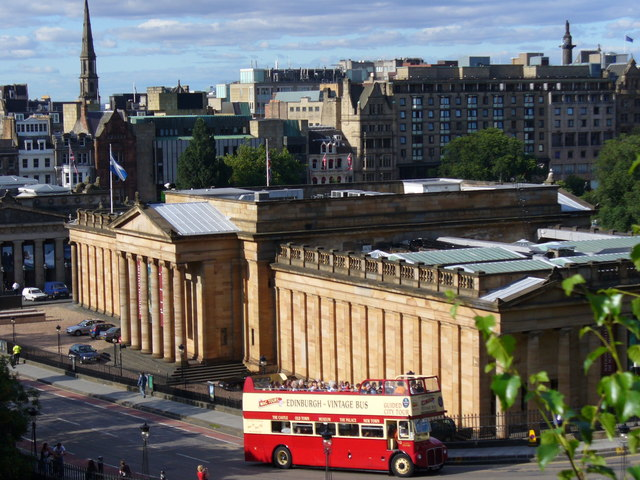
The National Gallery of Scotland, an 1859 neo-classical construction

- Eastbourne
  - "The Sunshine Coast"
- East Kilbride
  - "Polo Mint City" - referring to its estimated 600 roundabouts.
- Eastleigh
  - "Beastly Eastleigh"
- Edinburgh
  - "Athens of the North" – a reference to the many new public buildings of the Greek neo-classical style built in the eighteenth century, the most visually prominent of which, the incomplete National Monument, was modelled on the Parthenon.
  - "Auld Reekie" (Scots for Old Smoky) – because when buildings were heated by coal and wood fires, chimneys would spew thick columns of smoke into the air.
- Ely
  - "The Ship of The Fens" – referring to the size of the city's cathedral, and that due to the area's low-lying topography, it can be seen from miles around.

== G ==
- Glasgow
  - "Dear Green Place" – from one interpretation of the Scottish Gaelic name Glaschu. The name has older British Celtic (Brythonic) roots, reflected in modern Welsh as Glas-coed or -cae. (Green wood, or hollow). The Britons of Strathclyde (Ystrad Clud) were gradually displaced by the Dal Riata Scots, originally from Ireland, in the sixth and seventh centuries.
  - "Red Clydeside" – based on a post-World War I reputation as a centre of left-wing activity
  - "Second City of the Empire" – reference to the Victorian era industrial past of the city.
  - "Shipbuilding capital of the world" – another reference to the Victorian period in which the Clydeside shipyards were one of the foremost builders in the world.
- Great Yarmouth
  - "Yarco" – simple contraction of the name.

== H ==
- Hartlepool - British West Hartlepool. Disparaging nickname likening the town to a far-flung colonial outpost.
- Hebden Bridge
  - "The lesbian capital of the UK"
- Huddersfield
  - "Hudds" – shortened version of Huddersfield.

== I ==
- Inverness
  - "Capital of the Highlands"
  - "Inversnecky" and "The 'Sneck"

== K ==
- Kendal
  - "The Auld Grey Town" due to the use of grey Cumbrian limestone in its buildings.
- Kingston upon Hull
  - "Hull" – very commonly used shortening of the full name.
  - "Hull on Earth" – pun on the phrase "Hell on Earth".

== L ==
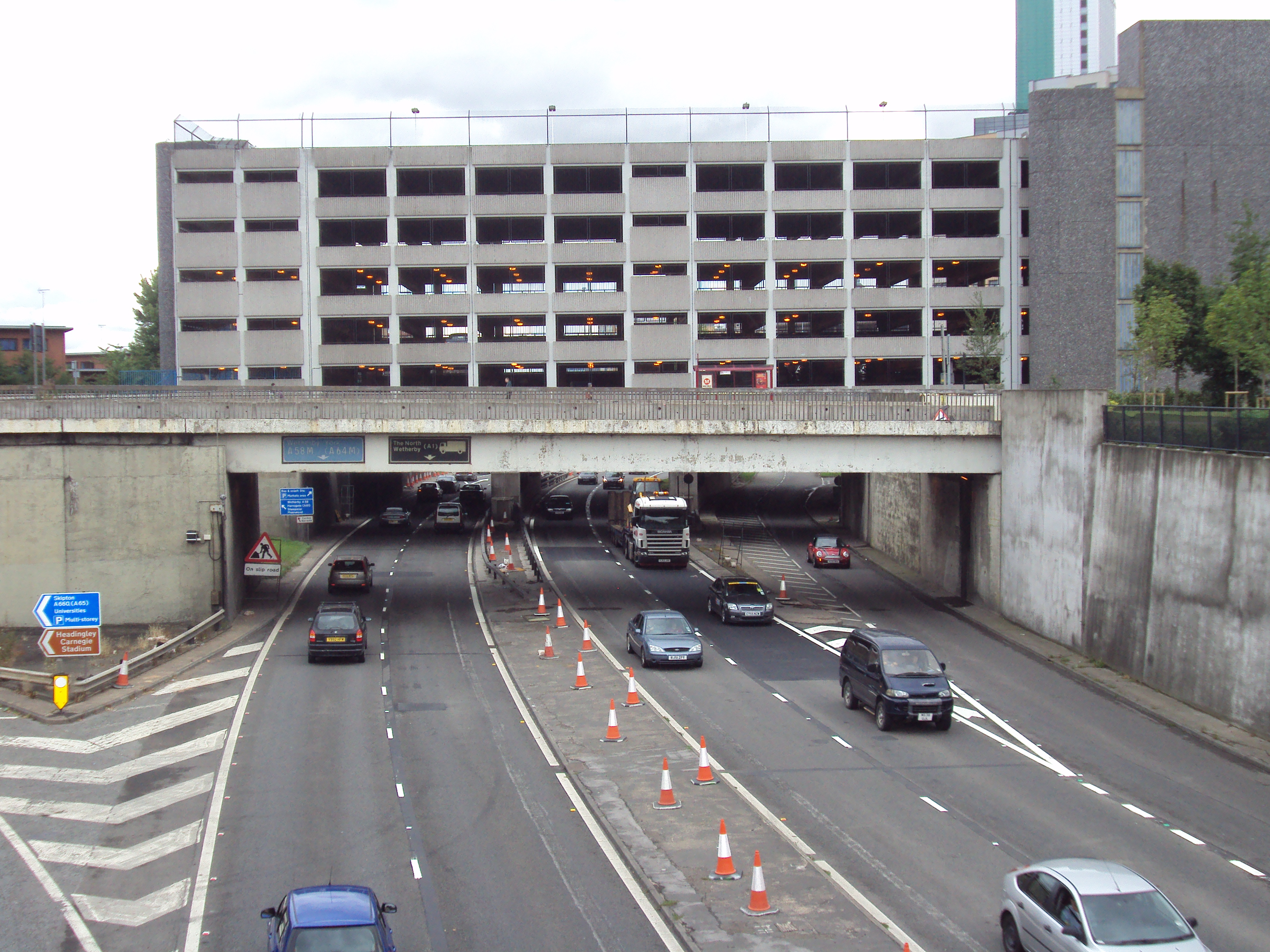
The construction of inner-city motorways in Leeds such as the Inner Ring Road (pictured) and the M621 in the 1970s led to its nickname motorway city of the 1970s

- Leeds
  - "Capital of the North"
  - "Gotham City"
  - "Gothic City"
  - "Knightsbridge of the North"
  - "London of the North"
  - "Motorway City of the Seventies"
- Leicester
  - "City of Kings" due to Leicester being the burial place of Richard III and King Leir (legendary/mythical founder of the city, after whom the city is said to have been named, and inspiration for King Lear) and, tongue in cheek, of the ghost of Lady Jane Grey the "Lady King" who is said to haunt Bradgate Park, just North of the city.
  - "King of the Midlands" from the time when Leicester was reputed to be the second richest city in Europe.
  - "Centre of England" due to the geographical centre of England being in a field just to the West of the city.
- Lichfield
  - "Lich Vegas"
- Liverpool
  - "The Second Capital of Ireland" or "Ireland's Second Capital"
  - "The World in One City"
  - "The Capital of North Wales"
  - "The World Capital of Pop"
  - "Scouseland"

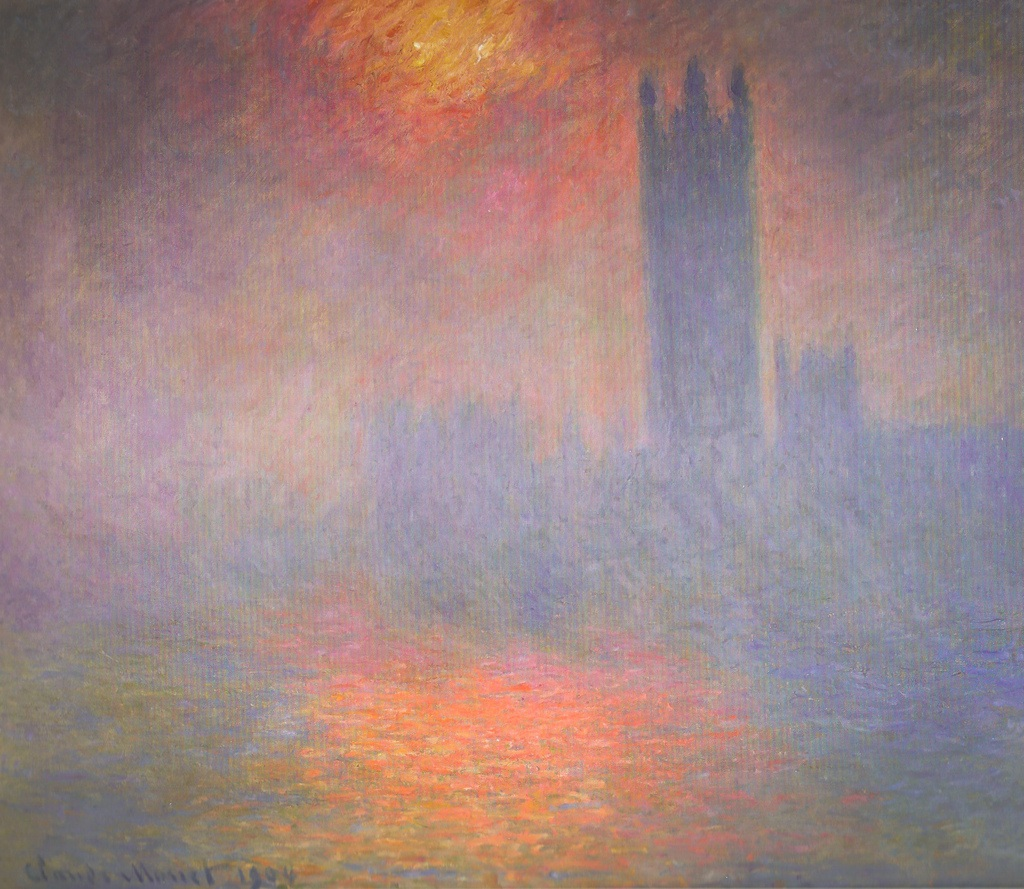
London's smogs inspired its nickname "The Smoke", as well as this work by Claude Monet

- City of London
  - "The City"
  - "The Square Mile" – reference to the area of the City. Both these terms are also used as metonyms for the UK's financial services industry, traditionally concentrated in the City of London.
- London
  - "The Great Wen" – disparaging nickname coined in the 1820s by William Cobbett, the radical pamphleteer and champion of rural England. Cobbett saw the rapidly growing city as a pathological swelling on the face of the nation.
  - "The Smoke" / "The Big Smoke" / "The Old Smoke" – air pollution in London regularly gave rise to pea soup fogs, most notably the Great Smog of 1952, and a nickname that persists to this day.
  - "Londongrad" due to its popularity with Russian oligarchs.
  - "Moscow on Thames" for the same reason.
  - "The London Laundromat" due to the role of its financial service companies in enabling financial crimes.

== M ==
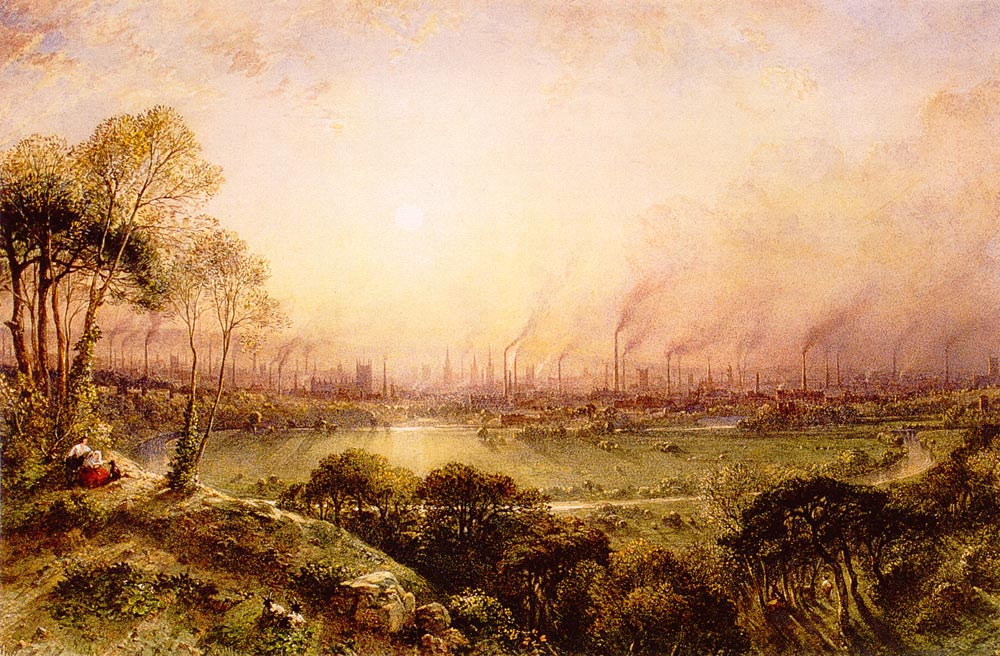
Manchester earned the nickname "Cottonopolis" in the 19th century due to its large number of cotton mills, as shown in this 1857 painting Manchester from Kersal Moor

- Manchester
  - "Cottonopolis" – originated in the 19th century, in reference to the predominance of the cotton industry there.
  - "Capital of the North" – the Greater Manchester Built-up Area is the largest metropolitan area in Northern England.
  - "Granadaland" – coined from the region's commercial TV operator, Granada Television, which is based in the city at Granada Studios, it was also used as a moniker for Manchester itself, especially in the media world.
  - "Gunchester" – name attached to the city by media in the 1990s because of the high incidence of gun crime in south Manchester.
  - "Madchester" – the name arising from a musical scene in the city in the late 1980s and early 1990s; and which has been attributed to Shaun Ryder, of the Happy Mondays
  - "Manc" - abbreviation of Manchester.
  - "Manny" - slang for Manchester used by non Mancunians.
  - "Manchesterford" – portmanteau of Manchester and Salford, began as a fictional setting for Victoria Wood's 1980s series of sketches on BBC TV, Acorn Antiques, but gained colloquial popularity, especially on the gay scene and was immortalized in iron and song lyrics during a 2005 staging of a stage musical version of the TV sketches.
  - "Rainy City" – Manchester is often perceived to have rainy weather.
  - "Warehouse city" – also emerged as a nickname in the 19th century thanks to the large number of warehouses constructed (1,819 by 1815), particularly concentrated in a square mile around the city centre. Many of these were noted for their scale and style.
  - "Mancunia" – the place that Mancunians, people from Manchester, reside and call home. Commonly used by proud Mancs when asked where they are from. Originates from the word "Mamucium" which was the Latin name for Manchester back in the day when the Romans conquered Britain.
  - "The Second City" – commonly used by Mancunians and Manchester enthusiasts, suggesting that the city of Manchester is the second most important city in England after London, not in size, but in quality of nightlife, culture, atmosphere, history, football clubs, music, etc.
- Middlesbrough
  - "Boro" – shortening of "borough", originally used to refer just to Middlesbrough F.C.
  - "Ironopolis" – from the city's former role in the iron industry.
  - "The Steel River" – not a specific nickname for Middlesbrough itself but rather the River Tees owing to the areas expansive steel industry on both sides of the river.
- Morecambe
  - "Bradford-on-Sea" – because of the numbers of people from Bradford who holidayed at the resort.
- Musselburgh
  - "The Honest Town".

== N ==
- Newcastle upon Tyne
  - "(The) Toon" – Geordie dialect meaning the Town (i.e. Newcastle) and hence the name Toon Army for supporters of the local football club.
- Newport
  - "The Port" – named after the Newport Docks which have been historically vital for the city and the region, and its football team who adopt the moniker.
  - "Black and Ambers" – the traditional colours of the city, based on its steelworks history, and the name of its rugby team Newport RFC.
- Norwich
  - ”Narch"/“Nodge” - the way some Norwich folk pronounce the name of their fine city.
  - "The Capital of East Anglia" - Norwich is the traditional regional capital of East Anglia.
  - "Norridge" - the way "Norwich" is pronounced by many Norvicans.
  - "The City of Stories" – rebranded by Norwich City Council as of 2014, after being awarded England's first UNESCO City of Literature.
- Nottingham
  - "Queen of the Midlands"
  - "Shottingham" in relation to the cities higher than average levels of gun crime.
  - "Robin Hood Country" Nottingham and the wider county of Nottinghamshire are often referred to as "Robin Hood country" because of its association with the legendary figure Robin Hood. According to folklore, Robin Hood was an outlaw who lived in Sherwood Forest in Nottinghamshire and was known for robbing from the rich to give to the poor. The stories of Robin Hood have been popularized in various ballads, stories, and films, cementing Nottinghamshire's connection to the legendary outlaw.
  - "City of Caves" due to Nottingham's abundance of catacombs and extensive cave networks.

== O ==
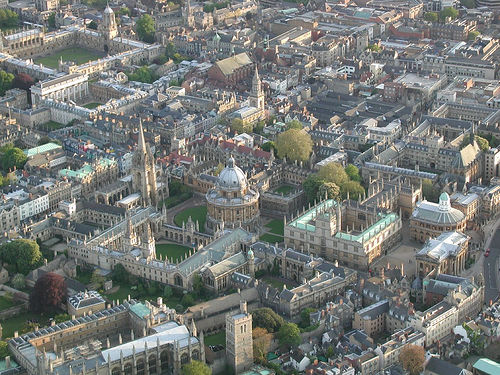
An aerial view of Oxford city centre, showing some of the spires that give the city its nickname

- Oxford
  - "The City of Dreaming Spires" – a term coined by poet Matthew Arnold in reference to the harmonious architecture of Oxford's university buildings.

== P ==
- Padstow
  - "Padstein" – in reference to celebrity chef Rick Stein's impact on the town
- Perth
  - "The Fair City" – in reference to Sir Walter Scott's novel The Fair Maid of Perth
- Plymouth
  - "Ocean City" – rebranded by Plymouth City Council as of 2013.
  - "Spirit of Discovery" – local council backed tag for the city, which relates to the Pilgrim Fathers, who departed from Plymouth for America in the 17th century.
  - "Guzz" – naval term, from a south Asian word for a measurement (yard – dockyard – homeport – Devonport – Plymouth).
  - Coventry-on-Sea
- Pontefract
  - "Ponte Carlo" – ironically alluding to the dissimilarity with Monte Carlo
  - "Ponty"
- Portsmouth
  - "Pompey" – thought to have derived from shipping entering Portsmouth harbour making an entry in their logs as Pom. P. in reference to Portsmouth Point. Navigational charts also use this abbreviation. Other derivations of the name exist, and the city's football club is also nicknamed "Pompey".
- Preston
  - "Proud Preston" – this nickname was said by Edmund Calamy to have been common in 1709, and it remains in use to this day. A common misconception is that the "PP" on the city's coat of arms stands for "Proud Preston", though the city council states that it actually stands for "Princeps Pacis" (Prince of Peace).

== S ==
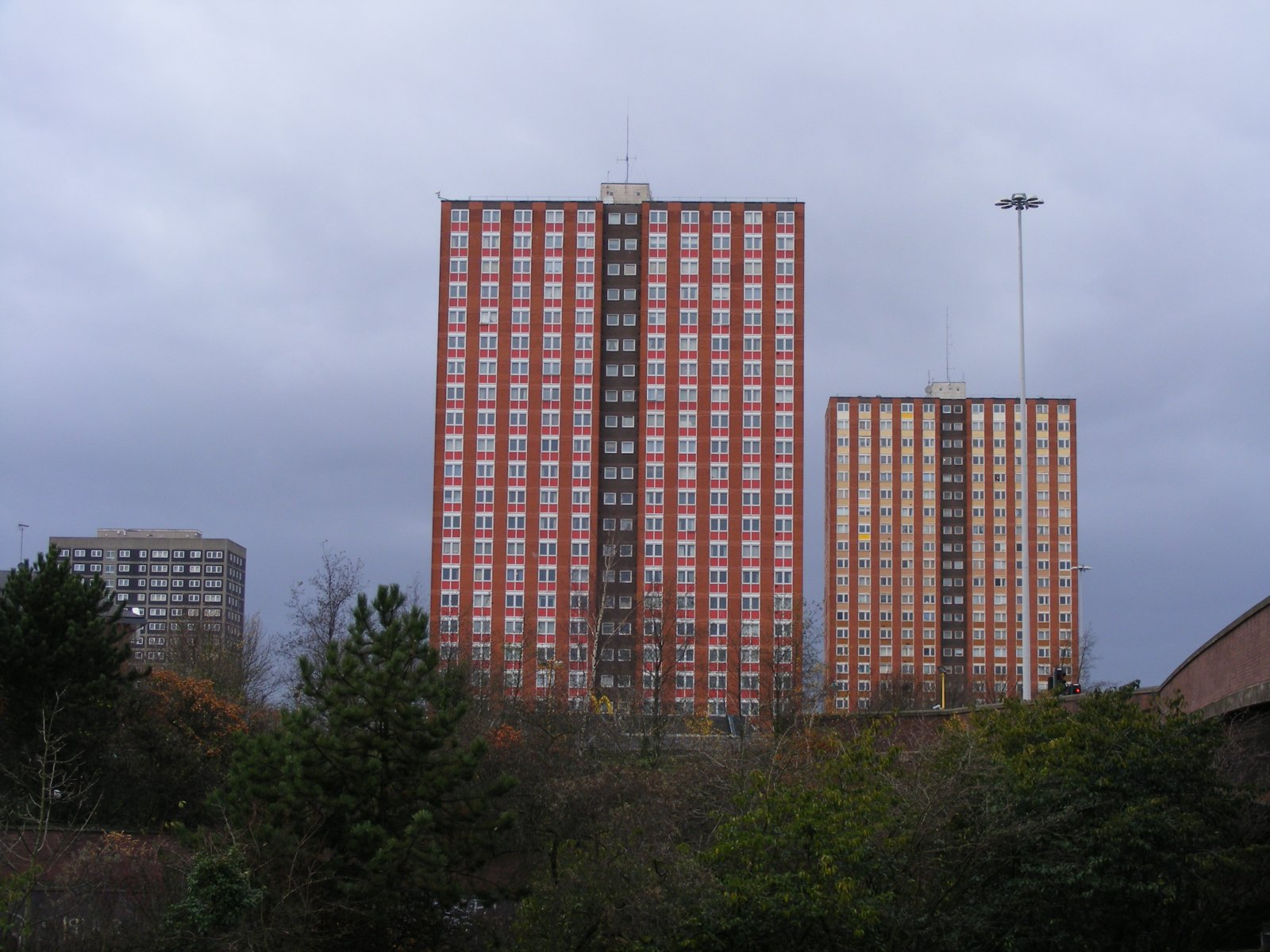
Tower blocks in Salford

- Salford
  - "Dirty Old Town" – song written by Ewan MacColl about the city, and made popular by The Pogues.
  - "Sunny Salford" – alliterative nickname and sarcastic remark referring to the city's near-constant grey and sunless skies.
  - "Costa del Salford" – another ironic nickname used in good humour to mock how unpleasant Salford's weather is, and how much of a holiday resort it would not make due to the unattractive and rundown look of the city, lack of things to do and lack of sights to see. Costa del Sol and Costa del Salford also sound similar.
- Salisbury
  - "New Sarum" - Alternative name linked to Old Sarum
- Scunthorpe
  - "Sunny Scunny" – ironically called due to the town's reputation for miserable weather.
  - "Scumthorpe"
- Sheffield
  - "Steel City" – reference to the dominant industry in Sheffield in the nineteenth and twentieth century.
  - "Sheff" - Abbreviation of Sheffield, typically used by residents of neighboring towns.
  - "People's Republic of South Yorkshire" (or Socialist Republic of...) – reference to the left wing politics of the city from the 1980s onwards.
  - "England's largest village" – term coined locally to reflect indigenous pride in the perceived inherent friendliness of the City's inhabitants and its low crime rates.
  - "Blunkettgrad" - in reference to the People's Republic of South Yorkshire
- Skegness
  - 'Sheffield by the Sea', on account of people from said city visiting the seaside resort during the Summer months.
  - "Skegvegas, SkeggyVegas"
- Southampton
  - "Soton" – from the shortening of Southampton to So'ton on road signage
- St Austell
  - "Snozzle"
- Stanford-le-Hope
  - "Stanford-no-Hope"
- Stoke-on-Trent
  - "The Five Towns" or "The Six Towns" – in the novels of Arnold Bennett the area that was to become the city is referred to as "the Five Towns"; Bennett felt that the name was more euphonious than "the Six Towns" so Fenton was left out.
  - "The Potteries" – after the city's former main industry.
- Swansea
  - "Copperopolis" – due to the city's past as a centre of the copper industry.

== T ==
- Torquay
  - "The English Riviera" – dates from Victorian times after people compared the Torbay area to the French Riviera.
  - "Torbados" – mockingly used to compare Torquay to Barbados.
- Trowbridge
  - "TrowVegas"
- Tilbury
  - "Island of Red in a Sea of Blue" – historic nickname for the town and the wider borough of Thurrock derived from their status as strongholds for the Labour Party and working class, radical left activity in Essex when the rest of the county turned to the Conservative Party with the rise of Thatcherism in the 1980s.
- Tiverton
  - "Tivvy“

== W ==
- Wakefield
  - "The Merry City" – dates from medieval times.
  - "Shakey Wakey" due to its liveliness.
  - "Wakey" - abbreviation.
- Whitby
  - "The Bath of the North"
- Winchester
  - "The City of Kings and Priests" – reputation as the historic capital founded by King Alfred the Great, as well as being an important religious foundation.
  - "Wenta" – shortened version of the city's original name when first established, Caerwenta.
- Worcester
  - "The Faithful City" – reference to the English Civil War.
- Wolverhampton
  - "Wolvo" – Referred to by locals.

== Y ==
- York
  - "Chocolate City" — reference to York's history of confectionary manufacturing.
  - "Ebor" — shortening of the city's former Roman name, Eboracum.

== See also ==
- City status in the United Kingdom
- List of adjectival and demonymic forms of place names#Cities
- Second city of the United Kingdom

General:

- Lists of nicknames – nickname list articles on Wikipedia
