= John Millard Dunn =

Australian church organist and choirmaster

John Millard Dunn (5 January 1865 – 3 March 1936) was an Australian church organist and choirmaster, notable for his long-standing tenure at St Peter's Cathedral, Adelaide, where he served for 44 years.

== History ==
John Dunn, born in North Adelaide as a twin son of John Charles Dunn and Lydia Charlotte Dunn née Smithson, of Barnard Street, North Adelaide, received his education at John Whinham's North Adelaide Grammar School. His early musical training included piano studies under Miss Francis of Glenelg, and later, with E. Smith-Hall and Herr Boehm. A choirboy at St Peter's Cathedral under Arthur Boult, Dunn was recognized as a featured soloist. He studied organ under Boult and, in 1882, became his assistant due to his remarkable proficiency. Despite being a finalist for the inaugural Elder Overseas Scholarship to the Royal College of Music in 1883, he did not secure the scholarship, which was won by Otto Fischer (later Otto Fischer Sobell). Dunn also held full-time positions with Francis Clark & Sons and the Bank of Australasia. In 1888, he sailed for London to study with W. de Manby Sergison, organist at St. Peter's, Eaton square, London, and in 1889, he continued his studies under Sir Frederick Bridge, the renowned organist of Westminster Abbey. Upon his return to Adelaide, he taught at the Adelaide College of Music (later Elder Conservatorium) under Cecil Sharp and I. G. Reimann. Appointed organist at the cathedral on 1 November 1891, he officiated at the inauguration of the new organ in 1930; the last service at which he presided occurred just a week before his death at the age of 71 years. His successor was the Rev. (later Canon) H. P. Finnis.

== Other activities ==
Dunn served as the conductor for the Adelaide Orpheus Society and as president of the Adelaide Society of Organists.

He composed the music for the stage musical The Mandarin with libretti by Harry Congreve Evans, performed at the Theatre Royal, Adelaide in 1896.

Dunn was a successful teacher of the organ; two of his students, Arthur H. Otto and Horace Weber, gained recognition in their own right. Otto, in particular, occasionally filled in as assistant organist. Dunn also taught music theory at Tormore House, a school for girls in North Adelaide.

== Recognition ==
A newspaper once nominated him as one of the 15 notable South Australian musicians of the late 19th and early 20th centuries, alongside figures like Frederick Bevan, Charles Cawthorne, E. Harold Davies, Thomas Grigg, and others.

== Family ==
John M. Dunn had four brothers: Frank C. Dunn (his identical twin), a banker in Sydney who retired to Mount Lofty; Walter C. Dunn of Launceston, Tasmania; Dr. Spencer S. Dunn, of Bournemouth, England; and George V. S. Dunn, a mining engineer in Isleworth, Middlesex, England.

On 29 August 1906, John M. Dunn married Gertrude Josephine Ann Henning (d. 15 May 1939) of North Adelaide. They had two children:

- Seymour Dunn, who moved to London and married Hazel Griffith in 1937
- Evelyn Young Dunn (10 March 1910 – ), who married Donnell Downey and lived at Thorngate

They were not closely related to the early settler Dunns of SA.
