= Clara Serena =

Australian operatic singer

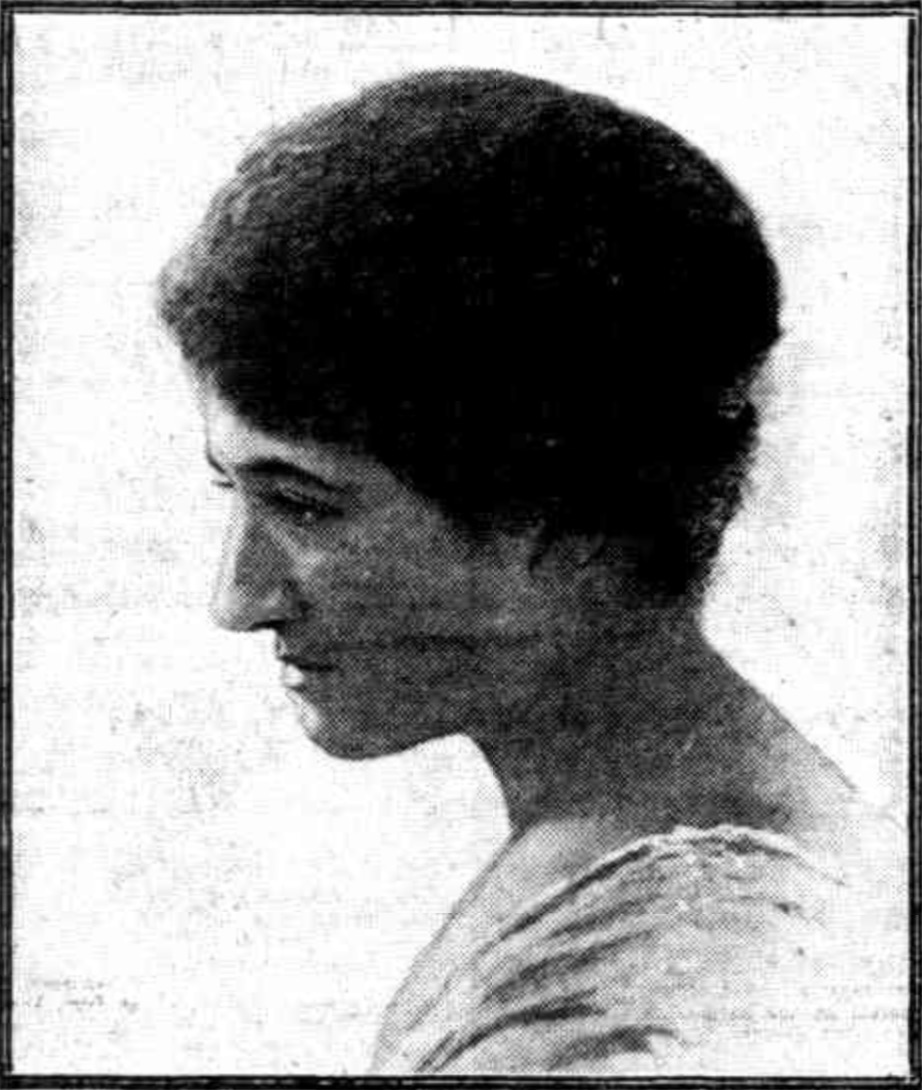
Clara Serena in 1915

Clara Serena Kleinschmidt (9 June 1890 – 11 August 1972) was an Australian operatic contralto singer, professionally known as Clara Serena. She had a successful career in London and in Europe, which was interrupted by the World War I, and resumed in 1923 with Roy Mellish, her accompanist and husband. They retired to South Australia in 1951.

== History ==
Kleinschmidt was born in Lobethal, South Australia, to German-born immigrants Hermann Franz Kleinschmidt (c. 1862 – 7 July 1939) and his wife Ida Kleinschmidt, née Seiler (c. 1866 – 15 September 1951)

She was well known in the district for her singing voice, but her career as a singer began in 1904, when Arthur Laughton and his friend David Waite, son of pastoralist Peter Waite, were at Oakbank for the Easter race meeting. Kleinschmidt was staying with her aunt and uncle, blacksmith Edward Marks opposite the lodgings where Waite and Laughton were staying. They heard her singing, crossed the road and asked to be introduced to the owner of the beautiful voice. (Note: A later retelling by Kleinschmidt herself is similar, except she has three young men, not two, and they were less polite.) As a result of this meeting, Clara was enrolled with the Elder Conservatorium, where she won a scholarship and was trained under Guli Hack, while living at the Waites' family home, "Urrbrae House".

In 1908 she won an Elder Overseas Scholarship to study for three years at the Royal College of Music, London. A great deal of money was needed to ensure Kleinschmidt made the most of this opportunity, and a trust fund was set up with £1,000 capital, raised by selling 1,000 £1 shares in a syndicate called the "Serena Trust Fund Ltd.". The terms of the agreement with Kleinschmidt's parents were that the fund would be repaid from her earnings in excess of £300 per annum, for ten years from when she left for London. and after it was paid off, one fifth of her income for the remainder of the ten-year period was to be divided among shareholders. (Note: The trust was wound up voluntarily in 1929; Andrew Laughton was the secretary and liquidator. It is likely that, due to the War, the repayment agreement was renegotiated to start in 1919, but no details have been found.) David Waite, Fred Basse, and Elizabeth Waite formed a board to safeguard Kleinschmidt's interests. As a spur to potential investors, an exclusive concert was held in the Lady Colton Hall, Hindmarsh Square, on 16 November 1908.

A "complimentary concert" was held for her on 12 December 1908 at the Adelaide Town Hall, which was filled to overflowing, and she left for England on 4 February 1909, with Elizabeth Waite as her chaperone and constant companion for the next eight years. Kleinschmidt was diligent in her studies and impressed all the professors with her progress. Those most involved in her tuition were singing teachers John Henry Blower and Albert Visetti, and the director, Sir Hubert Parry. She graduated ARCM and gained further experience on the Continent under professors Schulz-Doenburg and Bloch, preparing for her debut in grand opera as Clara Serena. In November 1912 Peter Waite offered to purchase all shares in the Serena Trust at face value plus five per cent. Fred Basse died on 17 April 1913 and David Waite died c. 25 May 1913. (Note: David Waite was discovered missing from the SS Wiltshire, presumed lost overboard in the Gulf of Suez, en route to England.)

=== Return to Australia ===
On 2 October 1914, with the Great War affecting everyone's lives, she and Elizabeth left London by the RMS Mongolia, were met at Fremantle by Peter Waite and arrived in Adelaide on 6 November 1914. Kleinschmidt returned to her parents in Lobethal. On 17 November she was surprised and delighted when the Lobethal Harmonia Club under M. F. Lauterbach, serenaded her.

She made her Adelaide debut as Clara Serena at a couple of Town Hall concerts on 1 and 4 May 1915. Supporting artists included Robert Jones, William Silver and Harold S. Parsons. Her accompanist was Roy Mellish. She may have been living with the Waites at "Urrbrae" again. Concerts at Broken Hill followed on 5 and 7 June 1915, when she was suffering from a cold, but was received enthusiastically. Soloists W. A. Robyns (basso) and Parsons were excellent, and Mellish was praised for his tasteful accompaniment. Melbourne followed on 26 June, to excellent notices, though one critic thought she strained for effect. A benefit for the Red Cross Society followed at the Adelaide Town Hall on 23 October, when Mellish conducted a 60-piece orchestra, and guest soloists were Silver and Parsons. This year was little different from those that followed throughout the War years; a few recitals at the Town Hall, concerts for a few patriotic or charitable causes (notably Red Cross), and each year a concert at Broken Hill, Mellish's home town. Elizabeth Waite married James MacMeikan on 10 February 1915. Serena and Mellish were engaged in 1917 and Peter Waite cut them out of his and his family's life. Undeterred, they married on 3 November 1917. She had successful concerts at the Adelaide Town Hall with the NSW Conservatorium Orchestra under Henri Verbrugghen on 12 May 1921 and 21 May 1921.

=== Off to London ===
Serena had a farewell concert on 6 December 1921 and they were given a complimentary concert on 21 March 1922 by the Adelaide Glee Club, at which artists included Sylvia Whitington, Fred Stone, George Pearce and Capt. Hugh King. Peter Waite died on 4 April 1922. Roy Mellish's last duty before leaving was to adjudicate at the musical section of the Easter Eisteddfod held at Maryborough, Queensland, as he had done the previous year. On his return to Adelaide the couple sailed for London on the steamer Nestor on 27 April.

On 27 February 1923 she appeared in concert at Wigmore Hall alongside her friend and mentor Ada Crossley, who came out of retirement for the event, and sang three duets with Serena. The London newspapers gave positive reviews, also praising Mellish, who played entirely from memory, including his own arrangement of "Drink to Me Only with Thine Eyes". (Note: A notable arrangement of this song was written by one Colonel Mellish (1777–1817). Coincidence?) Other engagements followed. She undertook further training in Milan with the baritone Mario Sammarco and on return to London sang 'Delilah' in Samson and Delilah with the National Grand Opera Company.

In January 1924 she created Alkestis, the title role of an opera by Rutland Boughton for the British National Opera Company at Covent Garden. The Morning Post said it was not much of a challenge for her, as it "consisted mostly of dying gracefully". She sang with the Royal Choral Society the contralto solos of Handel's Messiah at the Royal Albert Hall on Good Friday under Edward Bairstow, followed by an appearance at the Bournemouth Easter Festival for Sir Dan Godfrey. She sang at the Anzac Day service, at St Clement Danes church, (Note: Immortalized in the nursery rhyme "Oranges and Lemons") where Arthur Mason was organist, but Mellish presided for Serena's solo "Abide with Me". In April 1927 she gave a recital in Vienna at a Beethoven festival.

In 1927 Roland Foster, of the New South Wales Conservatorium, made a survey of conditions in England for aspiring Australian musicians, and reported that, thanks to the rise of radio broadcasting and the jazz craze, the British appetite for opera and concerts had diminished, and those who found work were not receiving the same fees. At the same time demand for tuition by singers had never been higher, with a consequent swelling of available local talent, and agents were closing their books.

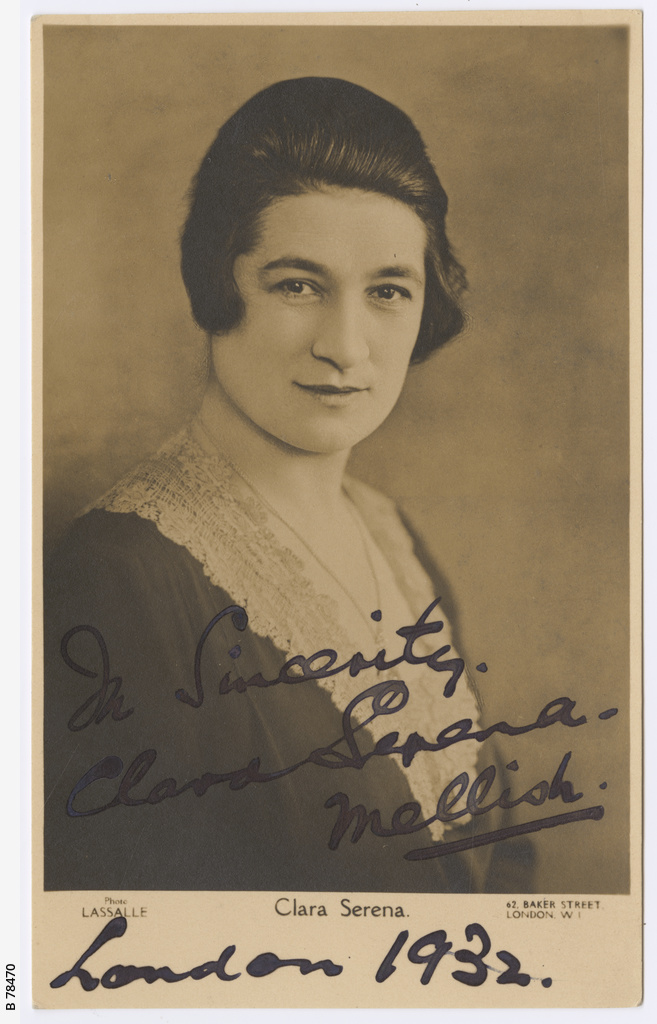
Signed photo of the Australian contralto Clara Serena (1890-1972), dated in London in 1932.

Serena and Mellish were seemingly immune: she sang in Götterdämmerung, Parsifal and Das Rheingold in May 1927 and prepared as understudy to Maria Olszewska for the part of Amneris in Verdi's Aida. In November 1927 she took the role of Amneris Aida with the British National Opera at the Golders Green Hippodrome, again to good reviews. In March 1928 she took the principal role in Handel's Solomon at the Queen's Hall under Sir Thomas Beecham. She was privately presented to the King and Queen during intermission, and to Sir Edward Elgar afterwards. and in July reprised her role in Aida at Covent Garden.

Elizabeth MacMeikan, née Waite, died on 5 April 1931. Of her £72,000 estate, she left £10,000 (many millions in today's currency) to her old friend Clara Serena née Kleinschmidt.

=== Return to Australia ===
In 1951 Serena and Mellish returned to South Australia on board the Strathaird, arriving 16 February 1951.

== Family ==
Clara Hulda Serena Kleinschmidt had two siblings: Friedrich Wilhelm Kleinschmidt and Elsa Ida Kleinschmidt, later Koster. She married Roy Mellish (1886–1970) on 3 November 1917. They had no children.

Clara Serena Mellish died on 11 August 1972 at Aldersgate Village, Felixstow, South Australia.

Brenton Langbein's mother was, reportedly, closely related to Clara Kleinschmidt, but no familial connection has yet been found.

== Roy Mellish ==
Mellish was born 21 February 1886 in Spalding, South Australia, to John Thomas Mellish (c. 1857 – 15 December 1939) and Margaret Mellish (née Ross), who married on 6 May 1885. He was the eldest of seven surviving children; the others were born in Broken Hill. The family moved to Adelaide in 1907 His siblings were:

- Hector Mellish, born in Broken Hill, 1890
- Peter Mellish, born in Broken Hill, 1892
- John Stephen 'Jack' Mellish (1894 – June 1980), born in Broken Hill.
- Isabella "Belle" Mellish
- Grace A. Mellish

All were proficient musicians and formed the "Mellish Melody Makers", which toured South Australia October–December 1908 to great acclaim; John was the "star", a boy soprano with the St Peter's Cathedral choir, receiving many awards. Mellish appeared with several of these family members in at least one concert at the Adelaide Town Hall in 1909, supporting organist Horace Weber. His three brothers enlisted with the First AIF and served overseas, John with distinction. Their mother was named as next of kin on their enlistment forms in 1916, living at Brougham Place, North Adelaide, in 1939 listed as 156 Kermode Street, North Adelaide; occupied by Grace Mellish in 1962.

Before becoming Serena's accompanist, Mellish was

- conductor, Adelaide Philharmonic Society in 1912
- a member of the Adelaide Glee Club, took over as conductor from Arthur Williamson when the latter enlisted in 1916.
- organist of Chalmer's Church, (later Scots Church, Adelaide) 1910–1919.

While in London, Mellish was a member of the Savage Club, and after they retired to South Australia, he was an active member of Adelaide's musical establishment. He was judge of "The News Aria Contest" in 1950, and praised Allan Giles for his work as accompanist to the contestants. He was a member of the Adelaide Male Voice Choir.

== Collections ==
The State Library of South Australia holds several items relating to the life and career of Clara Serena, including a three-page letter from Mellish to Clifford C. Jungfer: p.1 p.2 p.3 and audio recordings.

== Recordings ==
This is a sample, and not exhaustive:

For Vocalion

- "O Don Fatale" from Don Carlos (Verdi) and "Voce Di Donna O D'Angelo" from La Gioconda (Ponchielli) K-05227

For Columbia

- Vocal Gems from "Merrie England" Miriam Licette, Clara Serena, Francis Russell, Dennis Noble, Robert Carr, and chorus. Columbia 05026 (1930)
- Vocal Gems from "Maritana" Miriam Licette, Clara Serena, Heddle Nash, Dennis Noble, and a grand opera company chorus (1930). This set of recordings has been cited as Columbia 05026.
- "Just For Today"; "There is no Death." Sung by Clara Serena, contralto, Mellish, accompanist. (Columbia 01776) 1930
- Mendelssohn’s Elijah: Isobel Baillie as the widow, Clara Serena as the angel, Parry Jones as Obadiah, Harold Williams as Elijah, and the BBC national chorus and orchestra, conducted by Mr. Stanford Robinson. (14? 18? discs) 1930
- "Alas, those Chimes", and "Sainted Mother", duet with Miriam Licette

== Recognition ==
The Clara Serena Memorial Scholarship for vocalist students is awarded annually by the Lobethal Harmony Club. Serena Place, in the Canberra suburb of Chisholm, is named in her honour.
