= Ariel Shearer =

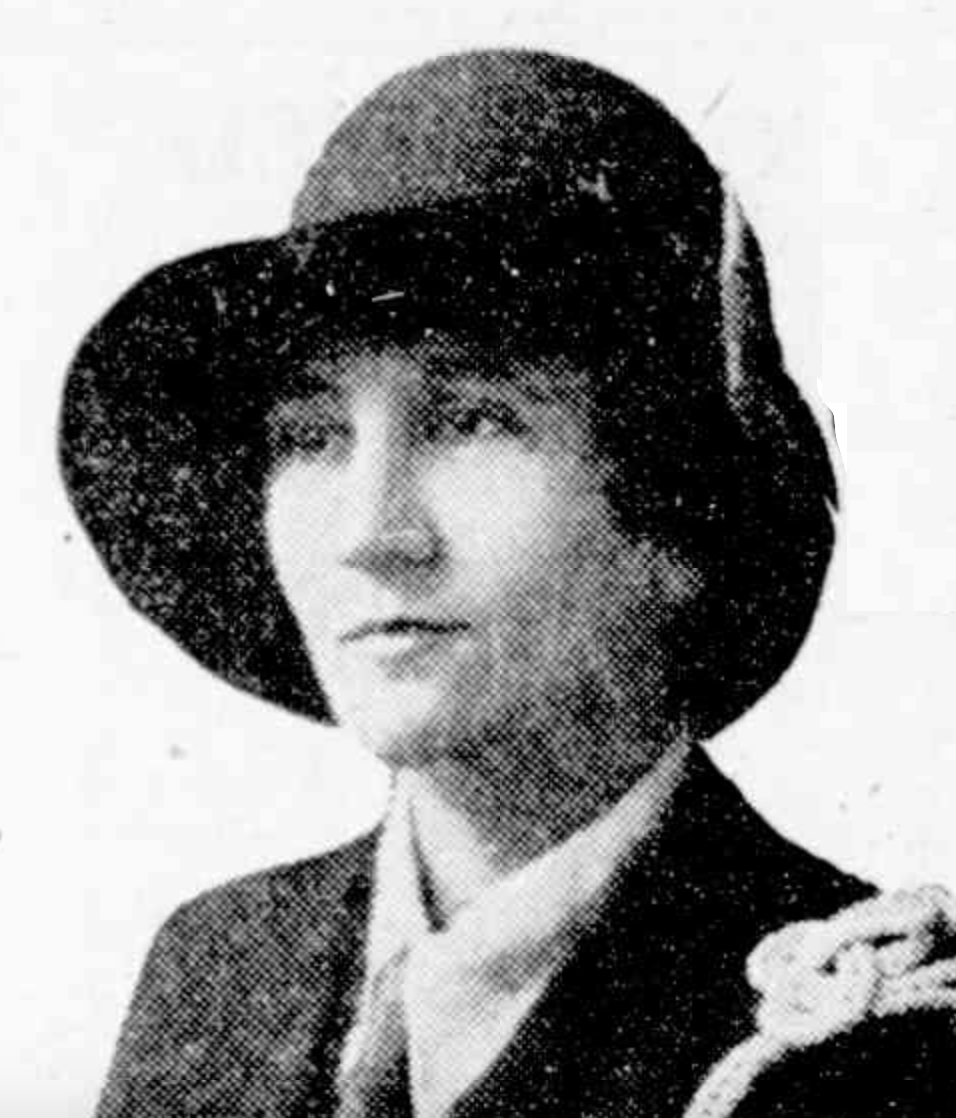
- Ariel Shearer, Girl Guide choral liaison commissioner, 1931

Background information
- Born: 1905; Australia
- Genres: Classical
- Instrument: Piano

Ariel Shearer (c. 1905 – ?) was an Australian composer and classical pianist.

She learned piano under William Silver (born March 1878), who also trained Elder Scholars Merle Robertson, John Bishop, Miriam Hyde and Ruth Naylor.

She left Adelaide in 1924 to study at the Royal College of Music. On her departure for London, Charles Cawthorne organised a benefit concert for her in the Adelaide Town Hall, which featured William Silver, George Pearce, Charles Schilsky, Harold S. Parsons, Harold Wylde FRCO, Vera Thrush AMUA, Hilda Gill AMUA, F. Stone, and basso Richard Watkins. She returned to Adelaide three years later, and was reported as having appreciated the experience, but was handicapped by a shortage of money and having to board with a family who were not musically inclined, or perhaps did not appreciate the artist's need to practise for hours on end.

In 1931, she and Charlotte Grivell (mezzo-soprano), a fellow student in London, were appointed choral liaison commissioners for Girl Guides in South Australia. The two held joint concerts during the ensuing decade then appear to have retired from the stage. They were also keen equestrians, and neither married. Her sister, Charlotte Annie "Lottie" Creedy, née Shearer, (12 December 1894– ), was a successful piano teacher.

== Compositions ==
- The Lady of Shalott, a song first performed by Charlotte Grivell and Ariel Shearer in 1928
- The Beacon, a song composed for Elsie Woolley to perform at the 1930 Ballarat competitions.
- Ode of Welcome, first performed by 1,000 Girl Guides for Lady Baden-Powell for her visit in 1931
- Bush Singing, Camp Fire and Green Frog, Girl Guide campfire songs, to words by Thelma Smith.
- Silver, which, sung by Vivian Axford, won the Australian composition prize at the Bendigo competitions in 1937.
