= The Great Wen =

Derogatory nickname for London, England

The Great Wen is a disparaging nickname for London. The term was coined in the 1820s by William Cobbett, the radical pamphleteer and champion of rural England. Cobbett saw the rapidly growing city as a pathological swelling on the face of the nation. (A "wen" is a sebaceous cyst.) The term is quoted in his 1830 work Rural Rides: "But, what is to be the fate of the great wen of all? The monster, called, by the silly coxcombs of the press, 'the metropolis of the empire?'"

== See also ==
- List of city nicknames in the United Kingdom
