= H. Winsloe Hall =

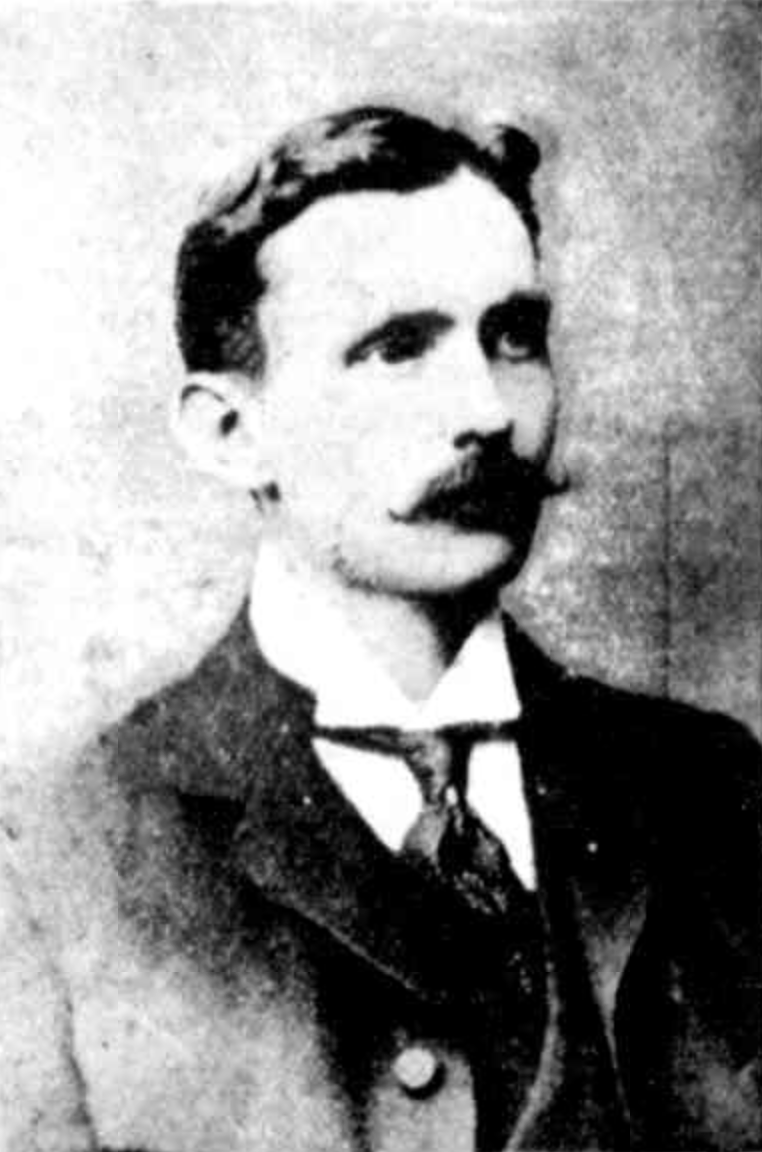
H. Winsloe Hall in 1910

Harry Winsloe Hall (1869 – 29 April 1936) was a conductor and singing teacher in Adelaide, South Australia.

== History ==
Hall was born in India, the fourth son of Major-Gen. Lewis Frederick Hall, and was educated at Lancing College, Sussex, and Magdalen College, Oxford University. He studied composition under Sir Hubert Parry and Sir Charles Stanford at the Royal College of Music, London. He studied singing with M. Jacques Bouhy in Paris.

He was deputy conductor and chorus master for Stanford's opera Shamus O'Brien in London under Sir Henry Wood, and for ten years was professor of singing at Blackheath Conservatorium.

In 1910 he accepted an invitation to join the staff of the Elder Conservatorium as a teacher of singing, and during his 25 years at the Conservatorium he trained some of the State's most successful singers, including Edna Lawrence, Stella Sobels, Muriel Day, Vera Thrush and Reginald Thrush, Alan Coad, Richard Watson and Jack Fischer.

He became an integral part of Adelaide's musical life, as a conductor of the Adelaide Orchestra, assembled by Sylvia Whitington AMUA to raise money for war charities 1915–1918. He was guest conductor with the South Australian Orchestra and the Conservatorium women's part singing class for a number of years, and also acted as musical director to the opera class. In 1913 his cantata for female voices and soloists A Garden of Flowers was presented at the Conservatorium, and his "fairy operas", The Ugly Duckling and Lochinvar were produced at the Theatre Royal in 1922 and 1929 respectively.

In 1936 he instituted a couple of scholarships for male and female singers, named for himself and his wife. He died at his home at 25 Thornber Street, Unley Park.

== Family ==
Hall married Georgina Delmar Cavendish in 1897; they had a son,

- Frederick Winsloe Hall (1899 – 24 June 1953) married Sybil Helen Fisher (born 1903) in 1933
