= Alfred Edward Simpson =

Australian architect (1868–1940)

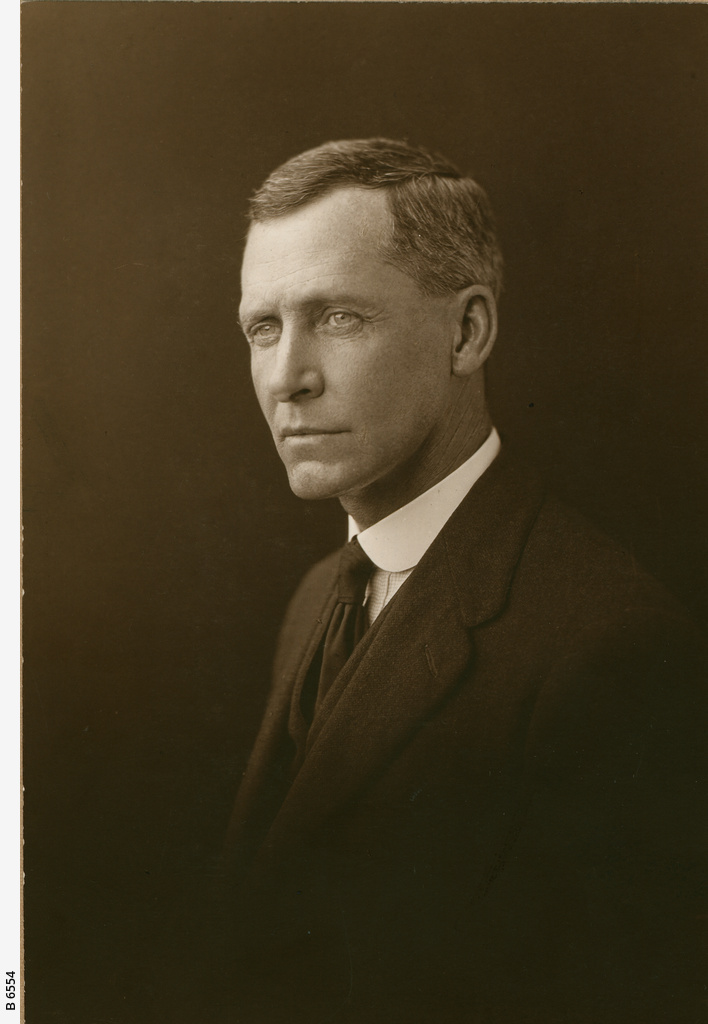
- Education: Prince Alfred College; University of Adelaide
- Occupation: Architect
- Practice: Architect in Chief for South Australia
- Projects: Parliament House, Adelaide; Adelaide Teachers' College

Alfred Edward Simpson (29 June 1868 – 9 September 1940) was an architect in South Australia, for 18 years that State's Architect in Chief.

== History ==
Simpson was born in Woodville, South Australia, the only child of Edward Robert Simpson (c. 1833 – 11 July 1900) of the South Australian Company and Jane Mossman "Jeanie" Simpson née Davie (c. 1837 – 15 April 1910) who married on 28 February 1865. Jeanie married again, to William Gilbert MP on 14 April 1904.

Simpson was educated at Prince Alfred College and the University of Adelaide before being articled to D. Garlick & Son architects. He was elected a Fellow of the Institute of Architects and on 17 March 1890 joined the S.A. Works and Buildings Department as a draftsman, and was promoted to Deputy Superintendent of Public Buildings in November 1917 and Superintendent in 1920.

Simpson was elected a Fellow of the South Australian Institute of Architects in 1914. He was also a Fellow of the Royal Australian Institute of Architects. He was awarded the Imperial Service Order in June 1936.

He retired in June 1938 and died two years later.

== Notable works ==
- Completed Parliament House, Adelaide, also added east wing
- Two-storey extension to Magistrates' Court, Victoria Square 1921, also a three-storey extension 1933.
- Adelaide Teachers' College Kintore Avenue 1927
- "Melrose Wing" extension to Art Gallery of South Australia 1936, also added classical facade and entrance foyer.

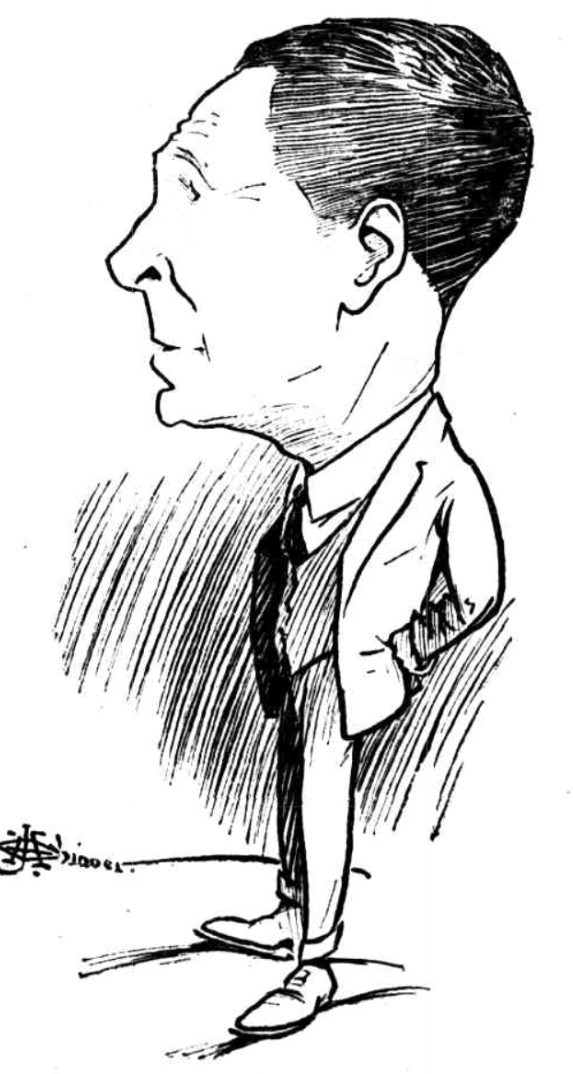
caricature by J. H. Chinner

== Family ==
Simpson married Frances Isabella Kell (died 7 November 1946 at vicarage, North Adelaide) on 7 September 1898.

- Brian Kell Simpson (1899–) married Elsie Gwendoline Sandford Colquhoun (1901–) in 1927
- Dorothy Mary Kell "Mollie" Simpson (10 March 1903 – 19 May 1970), one of South Australia's first physiotherapists, married Rev., later Canon, Horace Percy Finnis (died 1960) on 6 January 1945.
- Bessie Hope Kell Simpson (1905–) married Eric Alfred Burden (1903–1944) in 1935
  - John Edward Burden (b. 27 December 1935)
  - Robert Michael Burden (b. 25 May 1937) married (1) Margaret Anne Leahy (1937-1996) and (2) Margaret Stewart-Jones on 30 June 2000
    - Michael John Burden (Michael Burden) (b. 14 March 1960)
    - Alison Anne Burden (b. 4 October 1961)
  - Catherine Mary Burden (b. 27 May 1942)

They had a home in Watson Avenue, Toorak Gardens. They were not clearly related to the South Australian family of industrialists.
