= Finnis =

Finnis is an English language surname. Notable people with this name include:

- Benjamin Finnis (born 1937), British modern pentathlete
- Dorothy Kell Finnis (1903–1970), South Australian physiotherapist
- Edmund Finnis (born 1984), British composer of classical and electronic music
- Frank Finnis (1851–1918), British Royal Navy admiral
- Henry Finnis (1890–1945), British officer in the Indian Army
- Horace Percy Finnis (1883–1960), Anglican clergyman and organist in South Australia
- John Finnis (born 1940), Australian legal philosopher
- John Finnis (captain) "Captain Finnis" (1802–1872), seaman and overlander in South Australia
- Matt Finnis, chief executive officer of the St Kilda (Australian rules) Football Club
- Michael Finnis, British materials scientist
- Rachel Finnis, aka Rachel Brown (born 1980), footballer (women's soccer), married to Ian Finnis, pro golf caddie
- Valerie Finnis (1924–2006), British photographer, lecturer, teacher and gardener

== See also ==
- Finniss (disambiguation)
