= Finniss =

Finniss may refer to:

== People ==
- B. T. Finniss (1807–1893), Premier of South Australia

== Places ==
- Electoral district of Finniss, an electoral district in South Australia
- Finniss, South Australia, a small town
- Finniss Conservation Park, a protected area in South Australia
- Hundred of Finniss (Northern Territory), a cadastral unit
- Hundred of Finniss (South Australia), a cadastral unit

== See also ==
- Finnis, a related surname
- Finniss River (disambiguation)
