= St. Michael's Primary School =

St. Michael's Primary School may refer to:

- St. Michael's Primary School, Finnis, Finnis, County Down, Northern Ireland
- St. Michael's Primary School, Mowhan, Mowhan, County Armagh, Northern Ireland
- St. Michael's Primary School, Newtownhamilton, Newtownhamilton, County Armagh, Northern Ireland
- St Michael's Primary School, Winterbourne, Gloucestershire, England
- St Michael's Primary School, also known as St Michael's Parish School, Ashburton, Victoria, Australia
