= Old Parliament House, Adelaide =

Historic building in South Australia

Old Parliament House
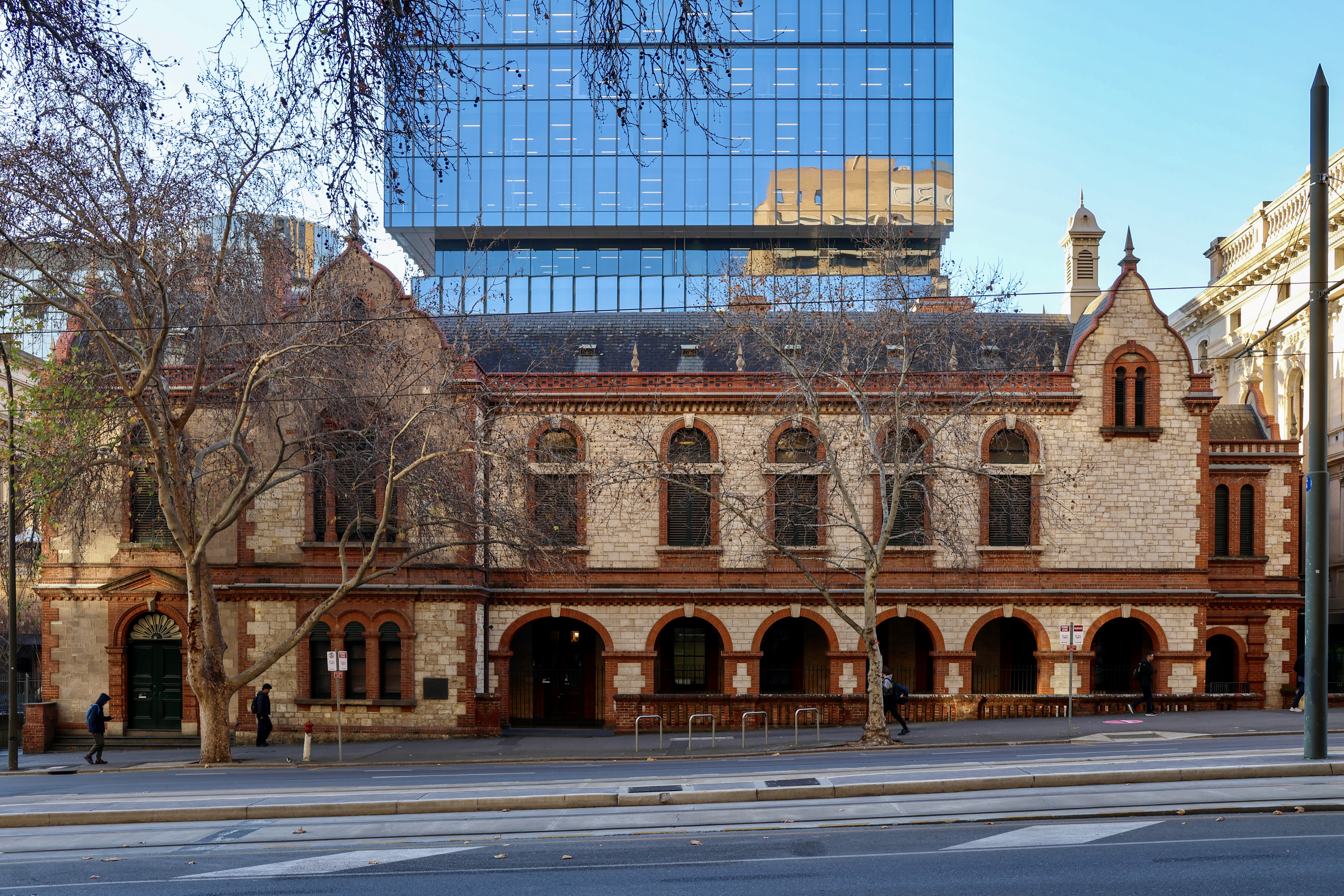
- Front view of Old Parliament House, 2026

General information
- Type: Parliament
- Architectural style: Elizabethan
- Location: North Terrace, Adelaide, South Australia
- Coordinates: 34.9213°S 138.5981°E
- Year built: 1854–1855
- Inaugurated: 22 April 1857
- Cost: A£17,550
- Client: Parliament of South Australia
- Owner: Government of South Australia

Technical details
- Material: Brick, limestone and sandstone
- Floor count: 2

Design and construction
- Architect: William Hayes
- Other designers: Edward Hamilton and Edward Woods
- Main contractor: English & Brown; I. W. Perryman

Australian National Heritage List
- Official name: South Australian Old and New Parliament Houses
- Designated: 26 January 2006
- Reference no.: 105710

South Australian Heritage Register
- Official name: Former Legislative Council Building Complex
- Designated: 28 May 1981
- Reference no.: 10874

Old Parliament House is the former seat of the Parliament of South Australia, located on North Terrace in the Adelaide city centre. It housed the House of Assembly from 1857 to 1889 and the Legislative Council from 1855 to 1939. It was entered on the South Australian Heritage Register in 1981 and the Australian National Heritage List in 2006.

The development of Old Parliament House came about due to the increase in legislative councillors in the 1850s. This is after the passage of the Australian Colonies Government Act 1850 and Ordinance No. 1 of 1851, which increased the number of members of the Legislative Council from 11 to 24. Thereafter, there was a design competition for the construction of a new parliamentary house, which was won by William Bennett Hayes, who was appointed the Colonial Architect in 1852. Construction work had been hindered by the effects of the Victorian gold rush, and consequently, a two-story building was erected by English & Brown from 1854 to 1855. The building was first used by the Legislative Council on 1 November 1855.

After the introduction of responsible government and a bicameral legislature through the constitution of South Australia of 1856, additional changes were introduced to cater for the House of Assembly. The existing structure was built on the present site between 1856 and 1857 through the contractor I. W. Perryman, and consequently the bicameral Parliament of South Australia met for the first time on 22 April 1857. Additional extensions and renovations were undertaken in the subsequent decades, which included construction works carried out by architect Edward Woods in 1875–1876, aimed at enlarging the House of Assembly Chamber and creating more offices. Following the erection of the west wing of the new Parliament House in 1889, all the activities of the parliament gradually moved to the new building, except for the Legislative Council, which stayed in the old building until 1939.

== Background ==
Between 1836 and 1843, South Australia was governed by a Legislative Council consisting of the governor and four nominated officials, which met in a room at Government House. The passage of the British Parliament's South Australia Act 1834 expanded the Legislative Council from five to eleven members and required its proceedings to be held in public, creating the need for a purpose-built Legislative Council Chamber with a public gallery. Construction of the chamber on the present Parliament House site began in July 1843 under the supervision of Jacob Pitman and was finished before the start of proceedings for the new legislature on 10 October 1843.

The original Council Chamber, completed in 1843, was a small single hall measuring about 10 metres (33 ft) long, 6.1 metres wide and 5.2 metres high, with a gallery accommodating about 50 people. Built as an annexe to the timber-framed Resident Magistrate's Office on North Terrace under Governor George Grey's policy of fiscal restraint, the building aligned with its construction budget of A£200 and featured two semi-circular windows on the southern side and a slate roof with a skylight for natural lighting. The new Council Chamber opened on 10 October 1843, when non-official members took their seats for the first time, and served as the Legislative Council's meeting place for the following 12 years. On 3 September 1843, The Observer commented that the building compared unfavourably with the neighbouring Government House and Bank of South Australia, while its report of 14 October noted that the chamber and gallery were filled during the opening proceedings, with an estimated attendance of about 200 people.

== History ==
=== Development and planning (1851–1852) ===
The Australian Colonies Government Act 1850 and Ordinance No. 1 of 1851 restructured the Legislative Council, expanding its membership from 11 to 24 members comprising 16 elected members and 8 nominees appointed by the governor. The governor ceased to sit in the council, and a speaker was elected from among its members. Under the new electoral arrangements, male adults who owned property valued at £100 or paid annual rent of at least £10 were eligible to vote for the 16 elected members. Eligibility to stand for election was more restrictive, requiring ownership of property valued at £2,000 or payment of annual rent of at least £100. As a result, about two-thirds of the state's adult male population were excluded from voting. The enlarged council created the need for a larger parliament building, and a design competition was held in 1851.

The competition was won by William Bennett Hayes, then a clerk of works in the Colonial Engineer's Department. After being appointed Colonial Architect on 1 January 1852, Hayes prepared revised plans for the new building. In accordance with William Light's plan for Adelaide, the parliament building was intended to be constructed on the south-west corner of Victoria Square as the centre of government administration. Construction, however, was delayed by the impact of the Victorian gold rush of the 1850s, during which many South Australians left for the goldfields.

=== Construction and extensions (1853–1868) ===
By 1853, when plans for a new parliament building were revived, the Legislative Council anticipated further changes to the government structure for South Australia, including the possible introduction of a bicameral parliament. Hayes was deputed to draw up arrangements for a House of Assembly comprising two chambers, one for 36 members and another for 12 members. Owing to uncertain economic conditions, no contractor was willing to submit a fixed price or construction timetable. In January 1854, a contract was awarded to English & Brown to construct a two-storey building adjoining the 1843 Council Chamber. The building was completed in July 1855 at a cost of £17,550, replacing accommodation that had become inadequate following the expansion of the Legislative Council to 24 members.

On 1 November 1855, the Legislative Council met for the first time in the upper chamber of the new building, having relocated from the original 1843 Council Chamber. In June 1856, the Constitution of South Australia received royal assent, establishing a bicameral parliament consisting of an 18-member Legislative Council and a 36-member House of Assembly. Voting for the Assembly was extended to men aged 21 years and over, while voting for the Legislative Council remained subject to property qualifications. Although proposals for a larger Parliament House continued, no agreement had been reached on its location. Following the death of Hayes in 1856, Edward Hamilton assumed responsibility for the project.

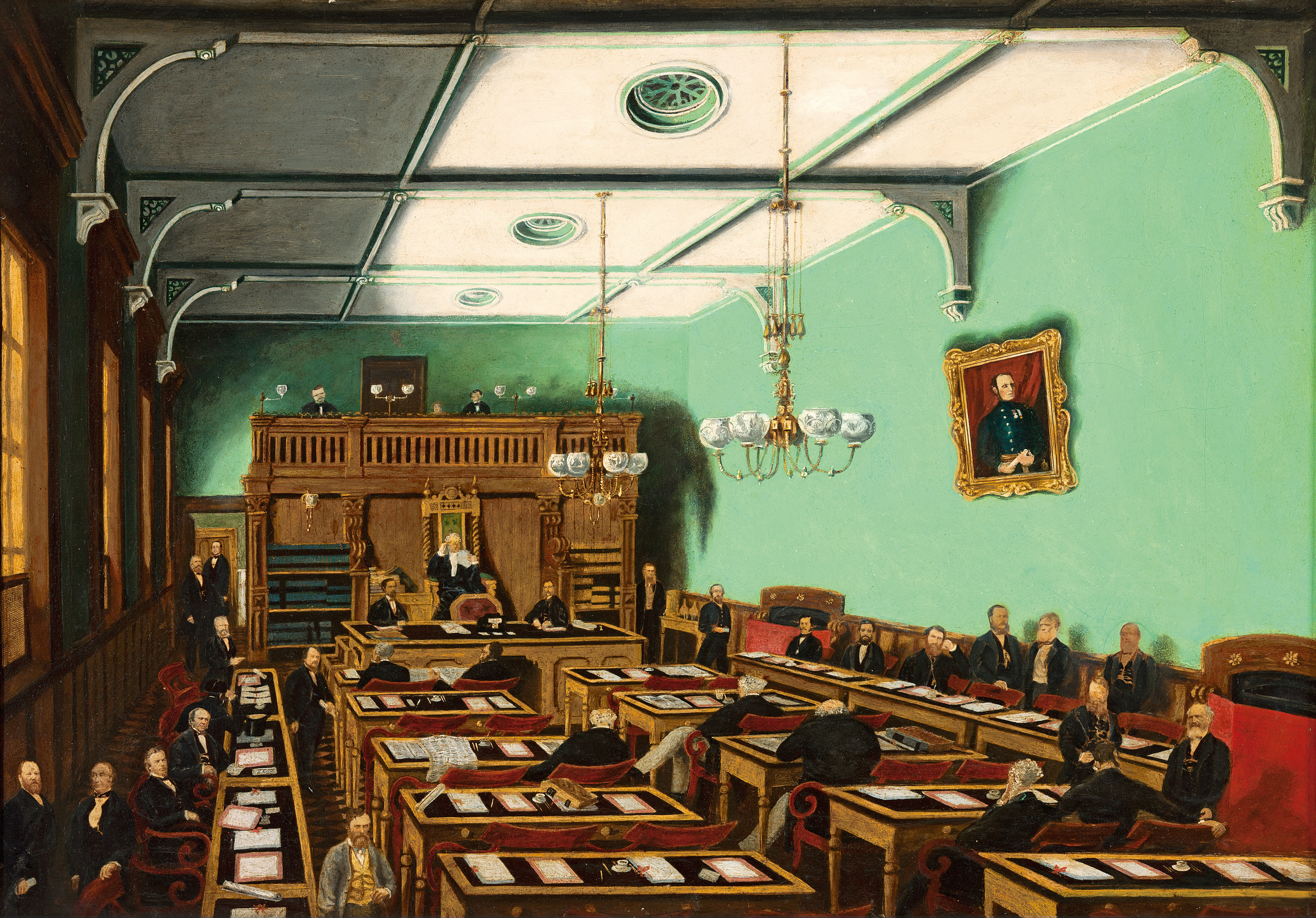
A House of Assembly sitting inside Old Parliament House, c. 1867

Construction of a lower house chamber on the present Parliament House site commenced in 1856 under contractor I. W. Perryman and was completed in ten weeks, allowing South Australia's first bicameral parliament to assemble on 22 April 1857. The extension incorporated two walls of the original 1843 Council Chamber, with the remainder of the building demolished. Between 1856 and 1858, additional facilities, including a wash house, lean-to shed, refreshment room and caretaker's quarters, were added to the increasingly confined complex. A refreshment room was added on the eastward side of the Legislative Council Chamber in 1861, followed by a library in 1865 to the north-west of the chamber. In 1868, the windows on the North Terrace elevation of the House of Assembly Chamber were widened and given rounded heads.

=== Expansion and decline (1872–1970s) ===
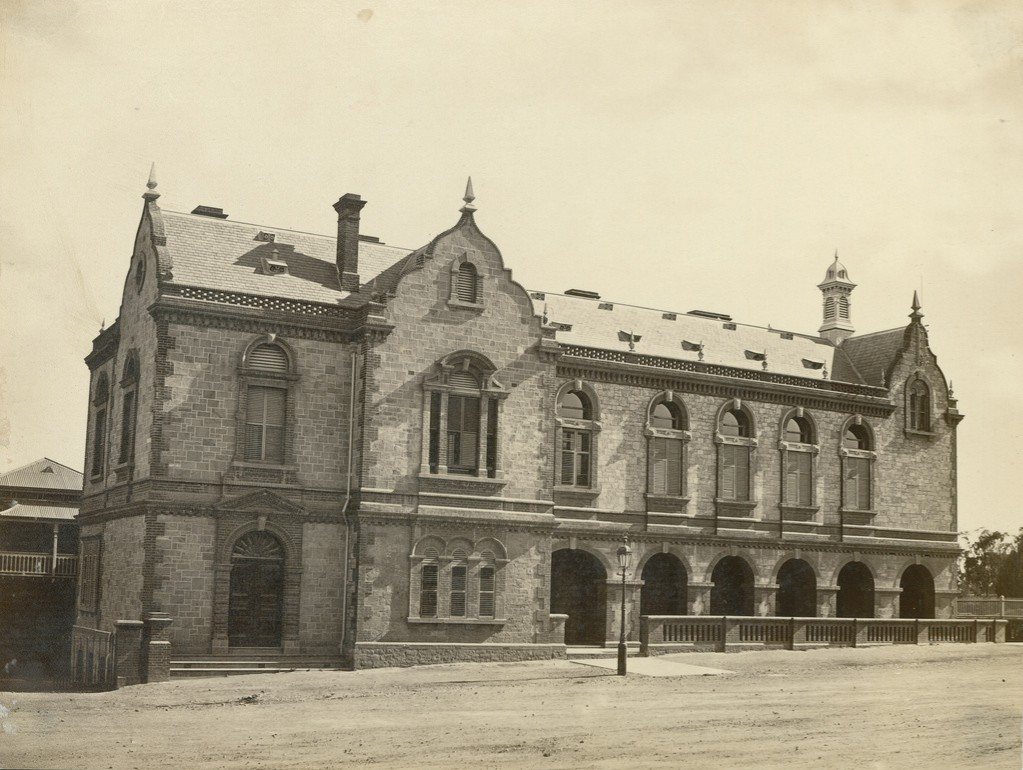
Old Parliament House viewed from North Terrace, 1872

In response to the growing population of the colony, the 1872 South Australian legislation added ten members to the Assembly as from 1875, creating a need for additional parliamentary accommodation. A design competition was subsequently held for a new parliamentary building, which later formed the basis of the new Parliament House. In the meantime, architect Edward Woods carried out alterations to the existing Old Parliament House, including the construction of a larger House of Assembly Chamber, a new staircase, additional offices through a westward extension, and two subterranean rooms in 1875. The works also included improvements to the ventilation system, and the extension was constructed using Mitcham sandstone, which is particularly visible on the south-west façade. Further additions to the south-west front were completed in 1876. Although demolition of the former parliamentary building had been considered after the end of construction work on the new House, the proposal was not carried out due to economic and other circumstances.

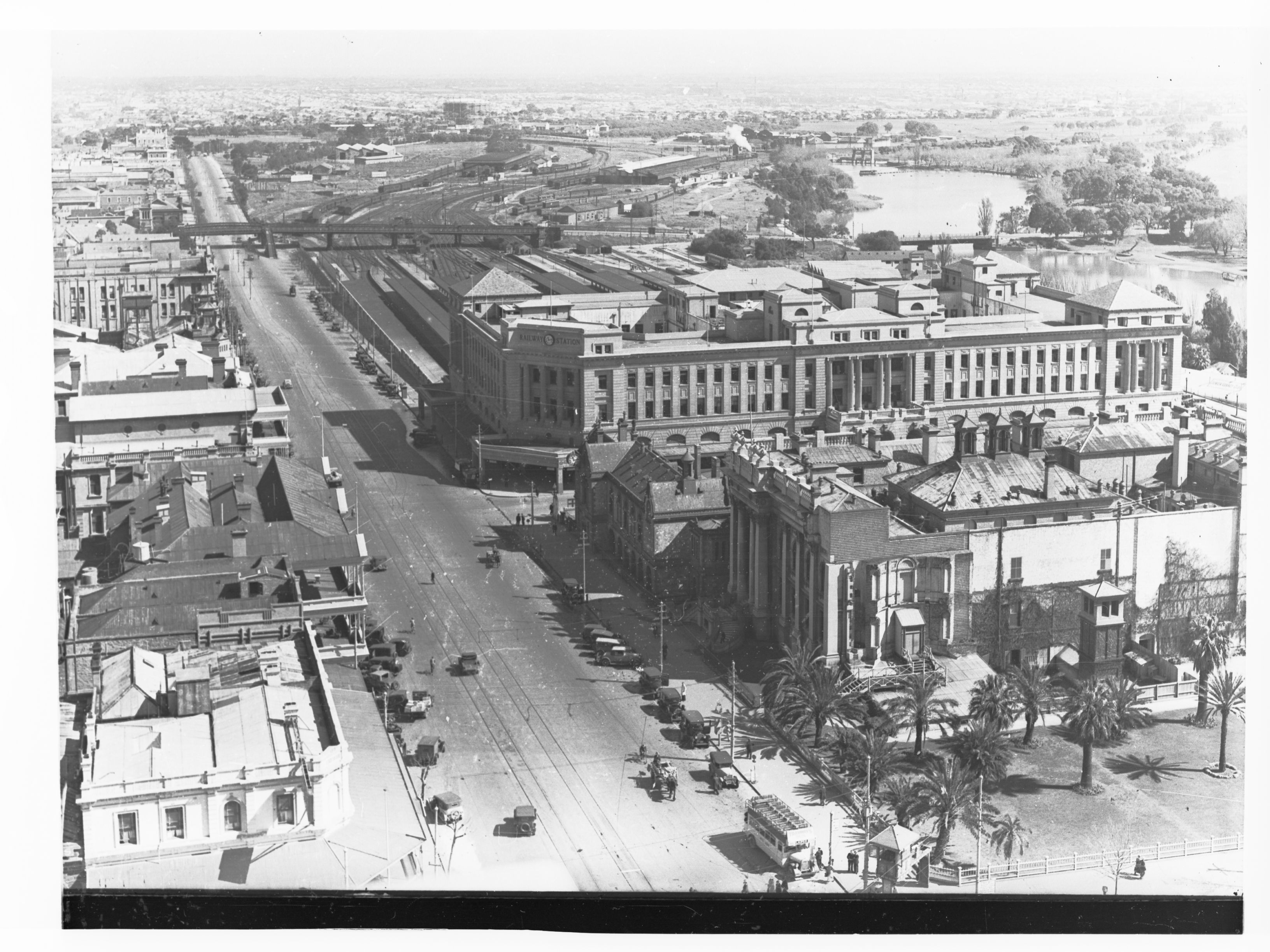
Photograph of North Terrace showing Old Parliament House beside the West Wing of the new parliament building Parliament House, c. 1935

In early June 1889, the new Parliament House was formally opened in the presence of about 1,200 guests. Following completion of its West Wing later that year, the House of Assembly relocated there, while the Legislative Council remained in the 1857 chamber of Old Parliament House. The former House of Assembly chamber was converted into a library, and an overhead passage was constructed to connect the two buildings. In 1894, the Legislative Council moved into the former House of Assembly chamber, where it remained until relocating to the East Wing of the new Parliament House in 1939. Although Premier Thomas Playford IV proposed demolishing the building after the opening of the new Parliament House, it was retained after serving as a Royal Australian Air Force recruiting office during the Second World War. In the post-war period, before its historical significance was formally recognised, the building was used for a range of government functions because of accommodation shortages. It later underwent a number of alterations, including the removal of a gallery and its slate roof in 1967, and by the mid-1970s had fallen into a poor state of repair.

=== Restoration and later developments (1970s–present) ===
In 1978, Premier Don Dunstan announced that Old Parliament House would be retained as a museum of constitutional history. Restoration works undertaken between 1978 and 1980 aimed to return the building as closely as possible to its 1875 appearance. Initial proposals by the Department of Publicity and Design Services included a computer-operated automated tour of South Australian history, but these were revised to incorporate research staff and dynamic exhibits. Dunstan also supported restoring the former Legislative Assembly Chamber, prompting a reassessment of the building's proposed museum function. The Constitutional Museum was established in Old Parliament House on 31 July 1980 and operated under that name from 1979 to 1986. The building was entered on the South Australian Heritage Register on 28 May 1981, and following the passage of the History Trust of South Australia Act in 1981, responsibility for the museum was transferred to the History Trust of South Australia, which commenced operations in 1982.

As visitor numbers declined, the Constitutional Museum closed in 1995, when parliament resumed occupation of Old Parliament House after outgrowing Parliament House. The building was unsuitable for modern parliamentary use because of its complex internal layout, multiple floor levels, narrow corridors, non-compliant stairways, ageing infrastructure, damp and deferred maintenance. It was consequently used only to a limited extent for parliamentary business, and alterations were made to some historically significant areas. The building was renamed Old Parliament House in 1986, while its façade had been maintained and restored during the museum conversion to reflect its 1875 appearance.

Old Parliament House continued to provide additional facilities for the Parliament of South Australia, including ministerial offices and meeting rooms for parliamentary committees. On 26 January 2006, Old Parliament House and the current Parliament House were jointly included on the Australian National Heritage List. The building was subsequently closed for nearly two years for a A$14.4 million renovation funded through the September 2010 state budget, which attracted criticism because it coincided with reductions in government services and employee entitlements. The project, which required approval from Cabinet and the Public Works Committee, involved renovating the 1843 building, including upgrading its plumbing and electrical systems, improving accessibility for people with disabilities, and constructing a new lift shaft. The building later reopened to the public through guided tours conducted by the Parliament of South Australia and during South Australia's History Festival. By 2026, Old Parliament House was one of the few significant government buildings constructed before 1860 that remained in Adelaide.

== Description and features ==
The Old Parliament House complex featured an Elizabethan-style façade constructed of white limestone and two-toned red brick. The limestone was obtained from a quarry, owned by the government, near the River Torrens. This also supplied the stone for Government House, Adelaide Gaol and Holy Trinity Church, while the later library was built of Dry Creek stone and the south-west extensions were constructed in Mitcham sandstone. The building included cellars beneath the ground-floor offices and refreshment room, and a large parliamentary chamber on the first floor with the speaker's chair and reporters' gallery on the west side and the strangers' gallery on the east. A ventilation turret provided air movement and thermal regulation for the chamber, and the House of Assembly Chamber was constructed using materials similar to those of the nearby Institute Building. Calcrete was also used in the construction of Old Parliament House.

== Gallery ==
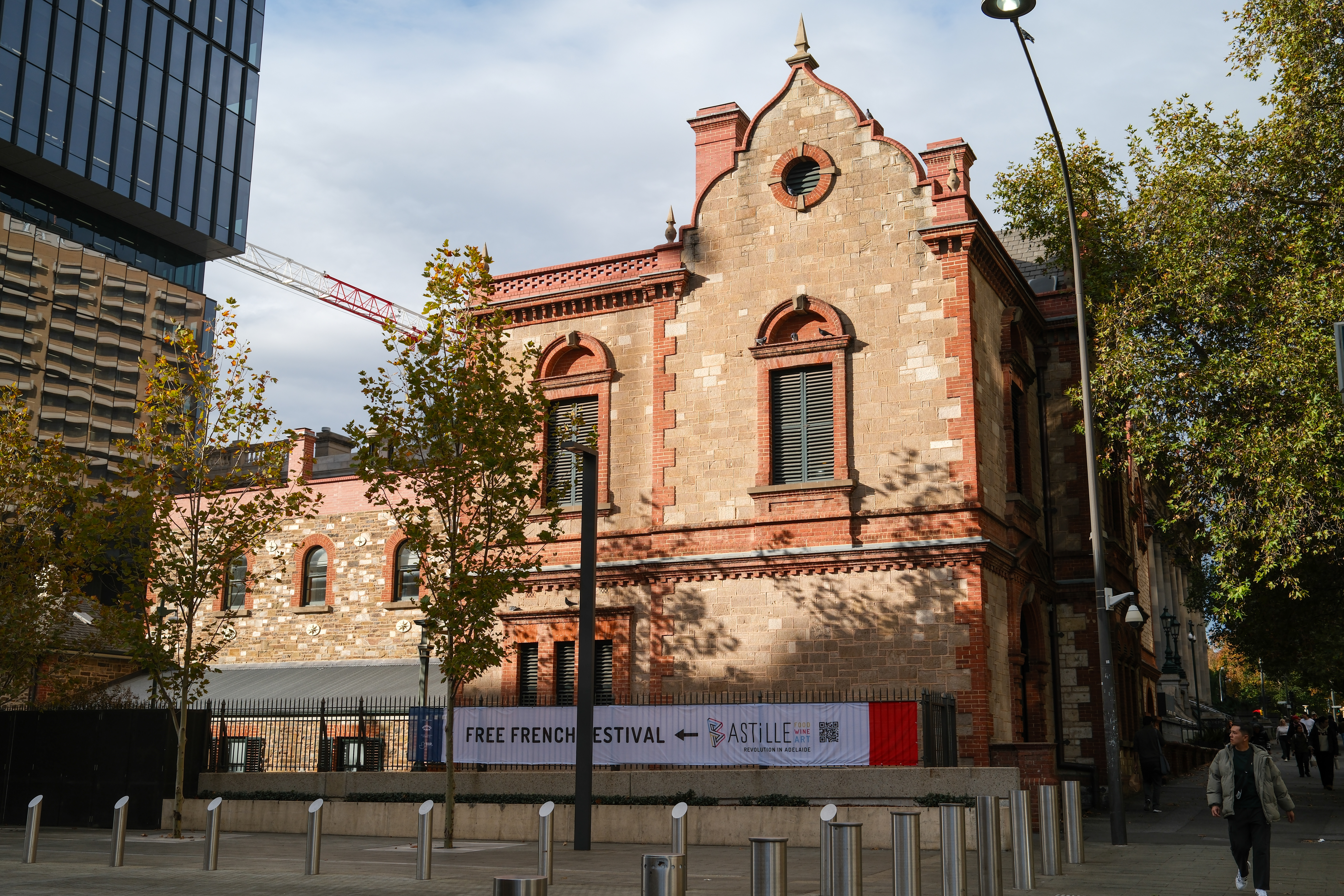
West façade of Old Parliament House, showing the chimneys and courtyard

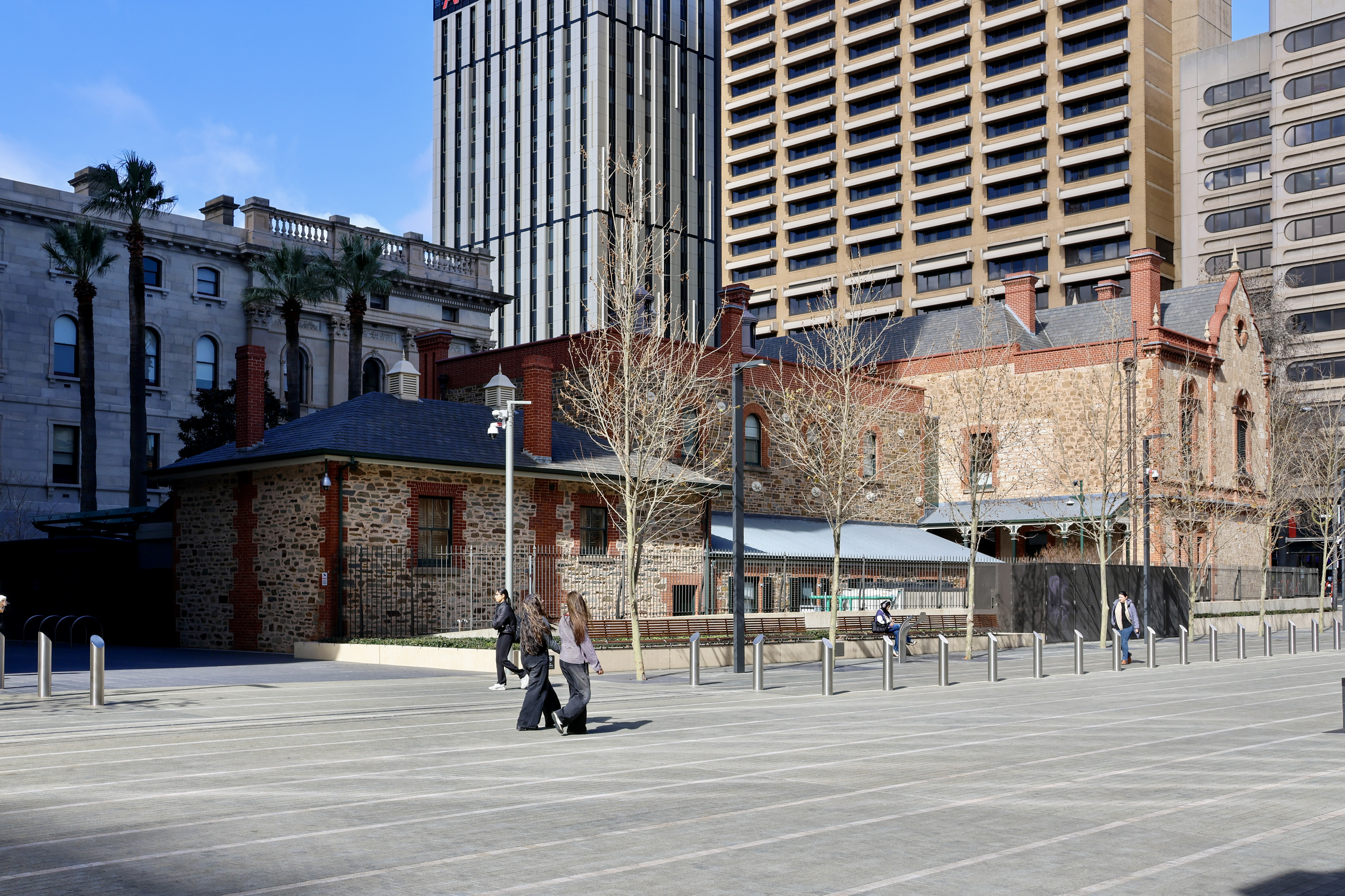
North-west façade of Old Parliament House

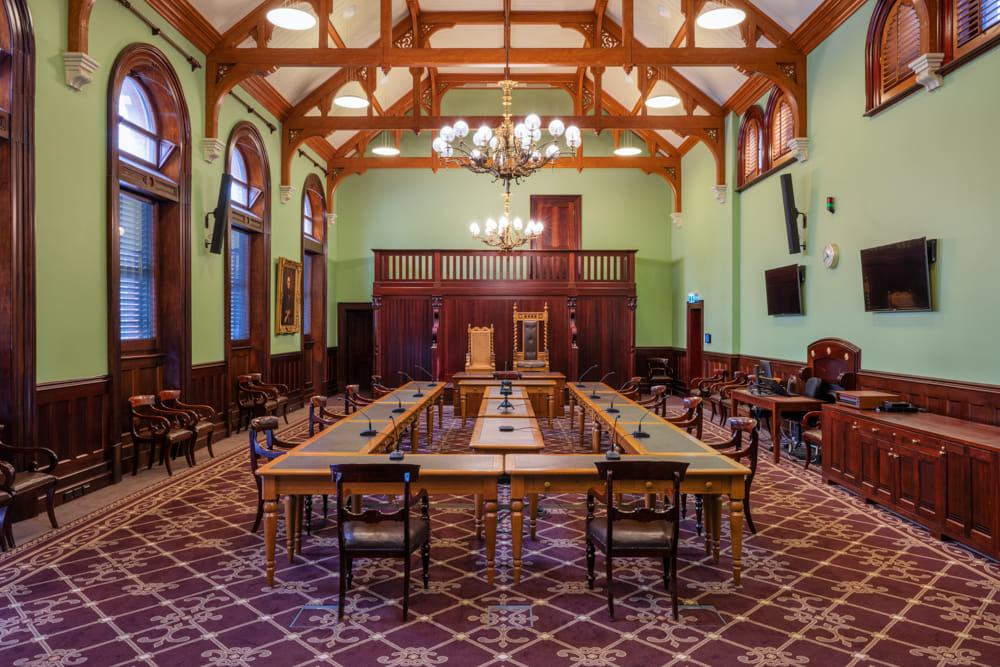
Fully furnished House of Assembly Chamber, facing west

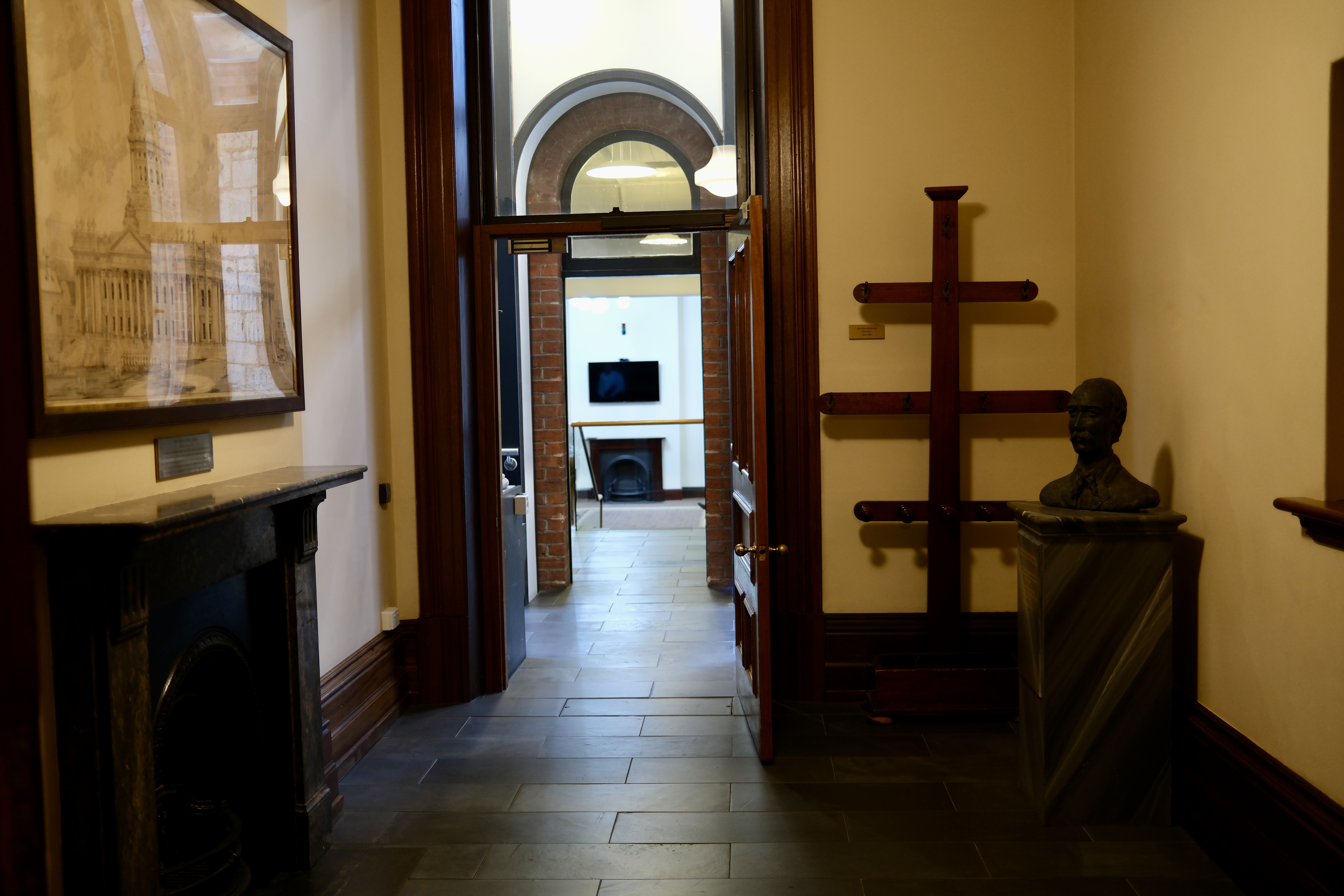
Corridor connecting new Parliament House with the Old Parliament House

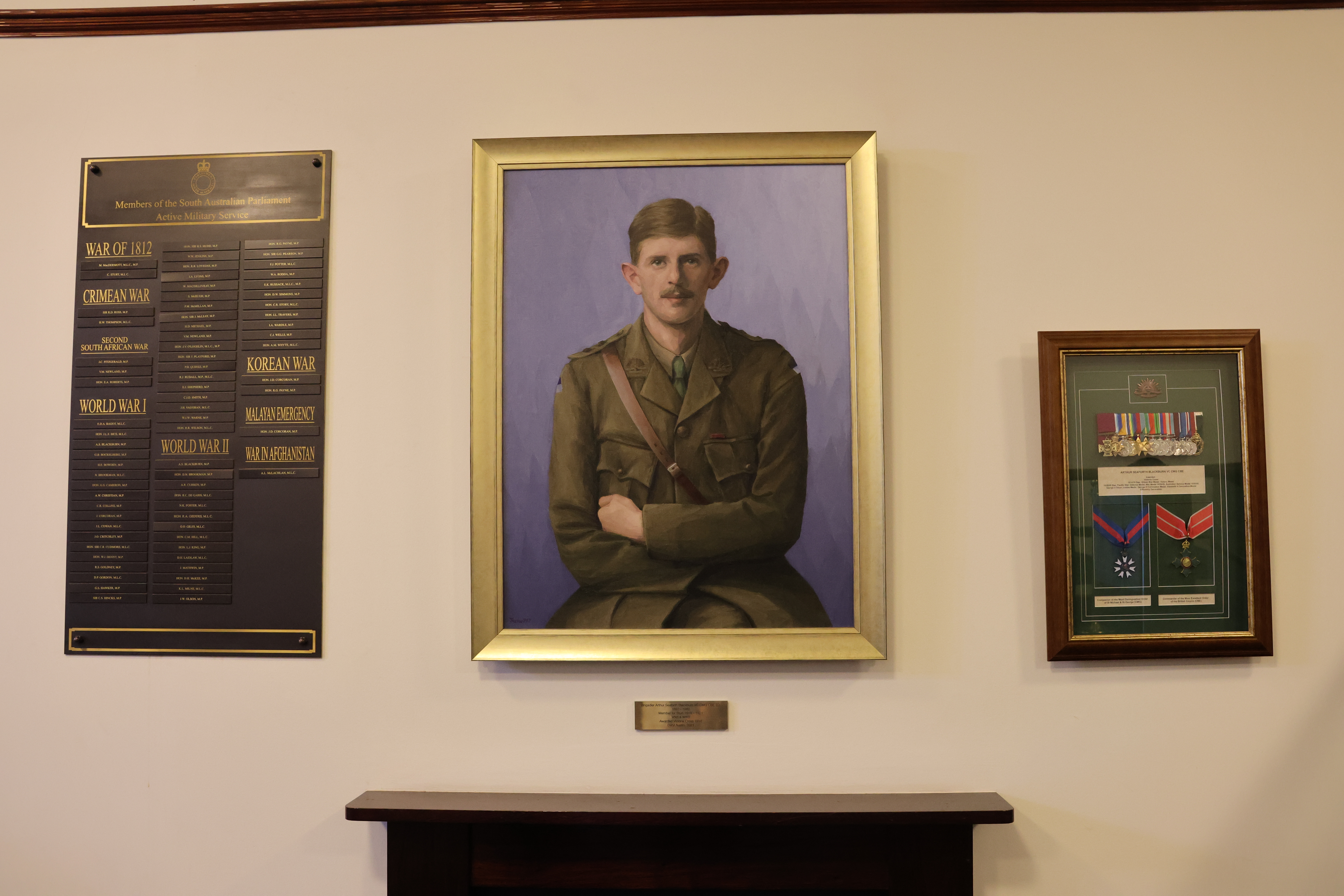
Plaque dedicated to military parliamentarians and portrait of Arthur Blackburn

Plaque commemorating the first parliamentary sitting under responsible government
