= Walter Everson Gardner =

Australian mining engineer and surveyor

Walter Everson Gardner (11 May 1873 – 14 March 1943) was an Australian mining engineer, surveyor, and manager in Broken Hill, New South Wales.

== History ==
Gardner was born in New Jersey in 1873, the youngest son of son of Charles Gardner JP (died c. 24 June 1933) and Sarah Gardner née Tallant (1849 – 4 May 1927) of "Bassein," Kew, Victoria. Charles was mayor of the City of Kew in 1896. His father was a representative of Cassell & Co., book sellers, and was for a time stationed in America. The family moved to Victoria, Australia in 1884 to establish a presence for the company.

He was educated at Kew High School, where he was Nichols' prizeman in 1886, and Scotch College, Melbourne, where he won a scholarship to Ormond College, Melbourne University. There he had a distinguished academic career, graduating MA and MSc in 1897, and in 1898 Bachelor of Civil Engineering, which included mining.

He moved to Broken Hill in 1897 to take up a post of assistant surveyor with BHP, which involved a great deal of underground survey work.

In 1900, he was appointed chief surveyor and draughtsman on the Block 10 mine, then in June 1903 was appointed assistant manager of the Central mine. On 9 April 1906 a sudden release of toxic gas occurred in the Block 11 mine, killing two immediately and trapping many more. Gardner made several attempts to get down to the trapped miners but was on each occasion driven back by fumes. He was one of those presented with a medal from the Royal Humane Society for his efforts.

Around June 1923, fire broke out among the shoring timbers of the Central mine. Firemen were unable to approach the seat of the fire, and efforts to flood the area through the old Kintore shaft and through holes left be the ground creeping came to nothing. By February 1924 6-inch bores were, under Gardner's direction, being made to the assumed location of the fire, and water poured in. By April 1924 work could be resumed underground but in September it was still burning. Manager James Hebbard retired at the end of 1924 and Gardner was appointed in his place, remaining there for the rest of his working life.

In 1928, with metals prices and demand plummeting, he sought a six month variation to the terms of labour employment to reduce the cost of operating the mine. Gardner retired when the mine shut down in 1940. He returned to Melbourne, living at Box Hill where he died.

== Other interests ==
- Gardner was one of the first radio amateurs in Broken Hill.
- He was a member of the Australasian Institute of Mining and Metallurgy

== Family ==
On 20 August 1903 at Exeter, South Australia, Gardner married Ethel Maud Dunn (1874–1965), second daughter of Mrs. John Dunn, of "Westward Ho," Semaphore, South Australia, previously of Hackney, South Australia. Their family included:

- Thelma G. Gardner ( – ) married Owen Thomas Morris only son of Mrs. O. H. Morris, of "Moorakyne", Mount Gambier, on 21 April 1927 at Sulphide Street Methodist Church, Broken Hill.
- Lynore Gardner ( – ) married R. H. von der Borch
- (Charles) Everson Gardner ( – ) married Lynette Elisabeth Finnis, second daughter of Rev. H. P. Finnis of North Adelaide.
- (John) Kelvin Gardner (c. 1911–1986) married Vivienne Belton Daniel of Bairnsdale, Victoria on 22 March 1943
- Joan Elizabeth Gardner ( – ) married Patrick C. "Pat" Peoples of Broken Hill
- Marie Gardner ( – ) engaged to be married to Charles Dunn of Princes Risborough, Buckinghamshire, England, July 1948

They had a home at 14 Fowler street, Box Hill, Victoria where he died.
