= Parliament House, Adelaide =

State parliament building of South Australia

Parliament House
- View of Parliament House from the corner of King William Street and North Terrace, 2026

General information
- Type: Parliament
- Architectural style: Neoclassical
- Location: North Terrace, Adelaide, South Australia
- Coordinates: 34°55′16″S 138°35′56″E
- Current tenants: Parliament of South Australia
- Year built: 1874–1939
- Inaugurated: 5 June 1939
- Owner: Government of South Australia

Technical details
- Material: Granite and marble
- Floor count: 2

Design and construction
- Architects: Lloyd Tayler and Edmund Wright
- Other designers: Alfred Simpson and Edmund Woods
- Main contractor: Kapunda Marble Company; James Shaw & Company; A. Slater

Website
- www.parliament.sa.gov.au

Australian National Heritage List
- Official name: South Australian Old and New Parliament Houses
- Designated: 26 January 2006
- Reference no.: 105710

South Australian Heritage Register
- Official name: Parliament House
- Designated: 24 July 1980
- Reference no.: 10845

Parliament House is the seat of the Parliament of South Australia, located on North Terrace in Adelaide city centre, and since 1889 the House of Assembly has been based at the building, with the Legislative Council being housed in the East Wing since 1939. The building was entered on the South Australian Heritage Register in 1980 and, together with Old Parliament House, was added to the Australian National Heritage List in 2006, which discusses the significance of these locations in respect of voting rights.

A parliamentary select committee recommended building a new Parliament House on land adjacent to King William Street, in 1864. A commission formed in 1874 under Governor Anthony Musgrave reviewed designs submitted through an architectural competition and accepted the proposal by Edmund Wright and Lloyd Tayler, although construction was postponed due to cost pressures and uncertainty over the preferred site. During the 1870s, further commissions and debates examined alternative locations, and in 1877 legislation authorised the use of park lands at North Terrace and King William Street. After additional design competitions in 1879, Parliament decided in 1881 to proceed with construction, assigning responsibility to the Architect-in-Chief's office under Edmund Woods, who adapted the earlier design.

Construction of the West Wing commenced in 1885 using local materials, but was halted due to a dispute, with the government subsequently changing the contractor that was originally selected to complete the build. Funding constraints also led to the planned towers and dome not being built. Consequently, the West Wing was finished in 1889 providing rooms for the House of Assembly with the Legislative Council still meeting in Old Parliament House. Plans for the construction of the East Wing were prepared in 1913 but progress stalled in 1914 due to World War I. The plans were revived in the 1930s by Architect-in-Chief Alfred Edward Simpson and funding was helped by a donation from John Langdon Bonython, with the construction starting in 1936. The East Wing together with the chamber for the Legislative Council was completed in 1939.

Parliament House has hosted significant political and constitutional events. The Australasian Federal Convention met there from March to May 1897 to debate a draft constitution for the proposed Australian federation. The building was also used for the proclamation of the end of the Second Boer War in 1902 and for the announcement of the Armistice of 11 November 1918. In addition, the formal announcements, in South Australia, of the accession of monarchs are made at the building.

== History ==
=== Development and planning (1855–1883) ===
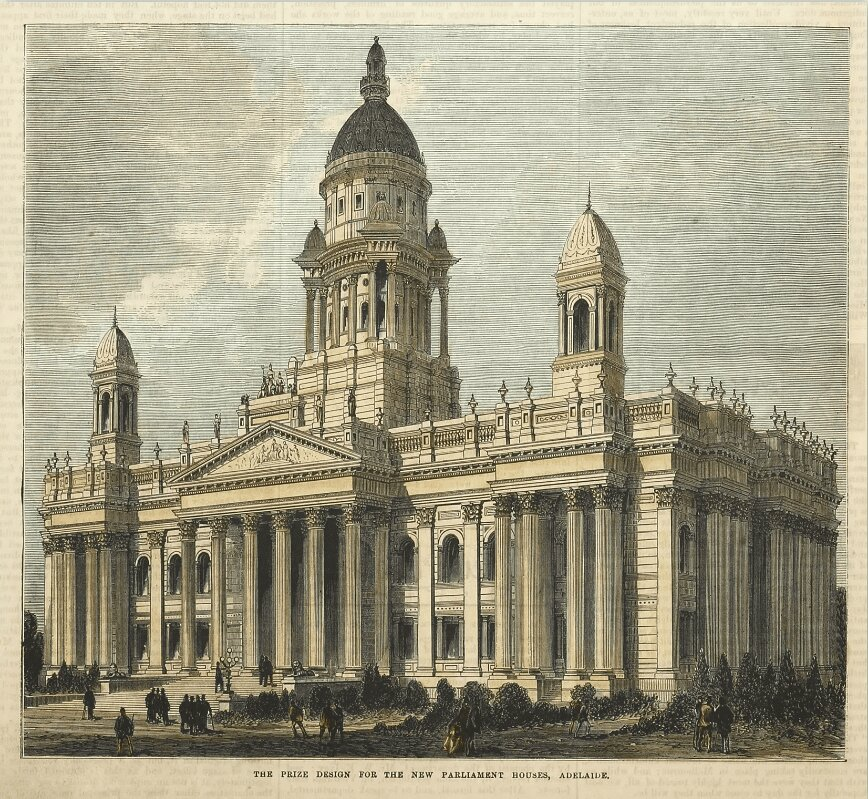
1874 sketch of the proposed building featuring the towers and dome

Criticism of the overcrowded and poorly ventilated environment of Old Parliament House emerged soon after its completion in 1855. In 1864, a parliamentary select committee recommended inviting designs for a new Parliament House to be constructed on vacant land located between what is now known as the Old Parliament House and King William Street (then known as City Bridge Road). In 1874, Governor Anthony Musgrave appointed a commission to examine the designs submitted in the architectural competition for the proposed building. Although the winning design prepared by Edmund Wright and Lloyd Tayler was accepted, site difficulties and financial constraints prevented construction from proceeding immediately.

In 1874, a commission was appointed to consider the site and design for a new Parliament House. Debate over its location divided opinion, with proposals including sites west of Victoria Square, on the Government House grounds west of the Institute Building, east of the Legislative Council, and at the junction of North Terrace and King William Street. Some supported the North Terrace site because it would preserve opportunities for future railway expansion elsewhere. Following continued debate and the appointment of additional commissions, legislation was passed in 1877 that approved the usage of park lands at the junction of North Terrace and King William Street as the site of the new building. In 1879, the government invited competitive designs for the proposed Parliament House, although the selected design was not built. Parliament resolved to proceed with construction in 1881, and, in an effort to reduce costs, responsibility for the project was transferred to the Architect-in-Chief Edmund Woods's office. In early 1883, Woods was instructed to prepare specifications despite opposition from some members of the House of Assembly. Woods subsequently revised the earlier design prepared by Wright and Tayler, and although he is generally credited as the building's architect, the revised plans were based on their original design.

=== West Wing (1885–1889) ===
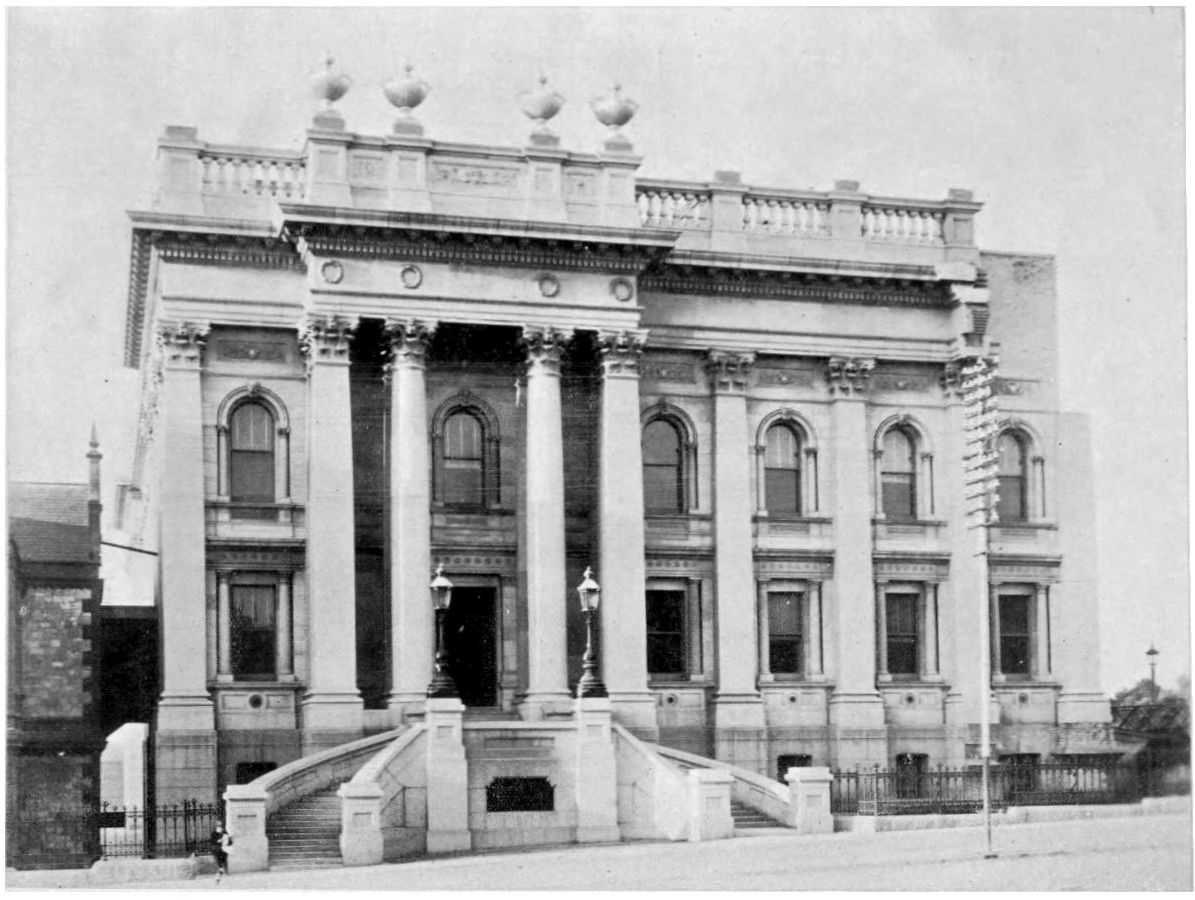
Photograph of the West Wing, 1901

Local materials, including Kapunda marble and West Island granite, were selected to support South Australian industries. The government awarded a A£102,000 contract to the Kapunda Marble Company to construct the West Wing. The company's work on the foundations and basement was initially described as satisfactory. However, disputes subsequently arose over the quality of the workmanship, and the contract was terminated in 1885. Construction was temporarily suspended, leaving more than 100 workers unemployed. In February 1886, the contract to complete the building was awarded to James Shaw & Company for £98,000, with approximately 95 workers employed on the construction site and a further 60 at a government-leased marble quarry.

The anticipated expense of the project resulted in further opposition; however, supporters argued that the building would provide a suitable commemoration of Australia's centenary in 1888. To reduce costs, the towers and dome included in earlier designs were omitted from the final building. The completed West Wing accommodated the House of Assembly chamber and associated offices, while the Legislative Council continued to meet in Old Parliament House. The total cost of constructing and furnishing the new House of Assembly was £165,404.

Construction was completed in March 1889, three months after the contractual completion date. The West Wing was officially opened on 5 June 1889 by Algernon Keith-Falconer, 9th Earl of Kintore during an "at home" reception hosted by Henry Ayers and John Cox Bray, attended by more than 1,000 guests. The House of Assembly first met in the new chamber on 6 June 1889.

=== East Wing (1913–1939) ===
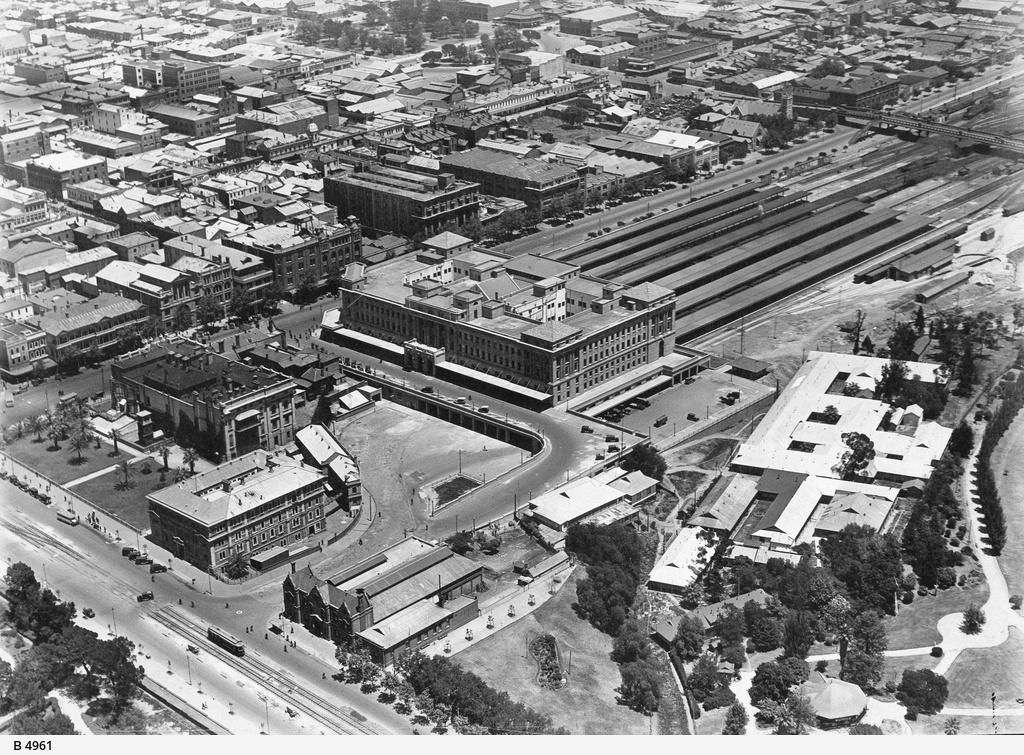
West Wing (far left) in 1928, with the vacant site of the East Wing next to it and Adelaide railway station (centre)

Proposals for the East Wing were not revisited until 1913, when the Architect-in-Chief's Office prepared sketch designs that omitted the originally proposed towers and dome. The plans were endorsed by a joint parliamentary committee but were suspended following the outbreak of World War I in 1914, leaving Parliament House incomplete for approximately 50 years.

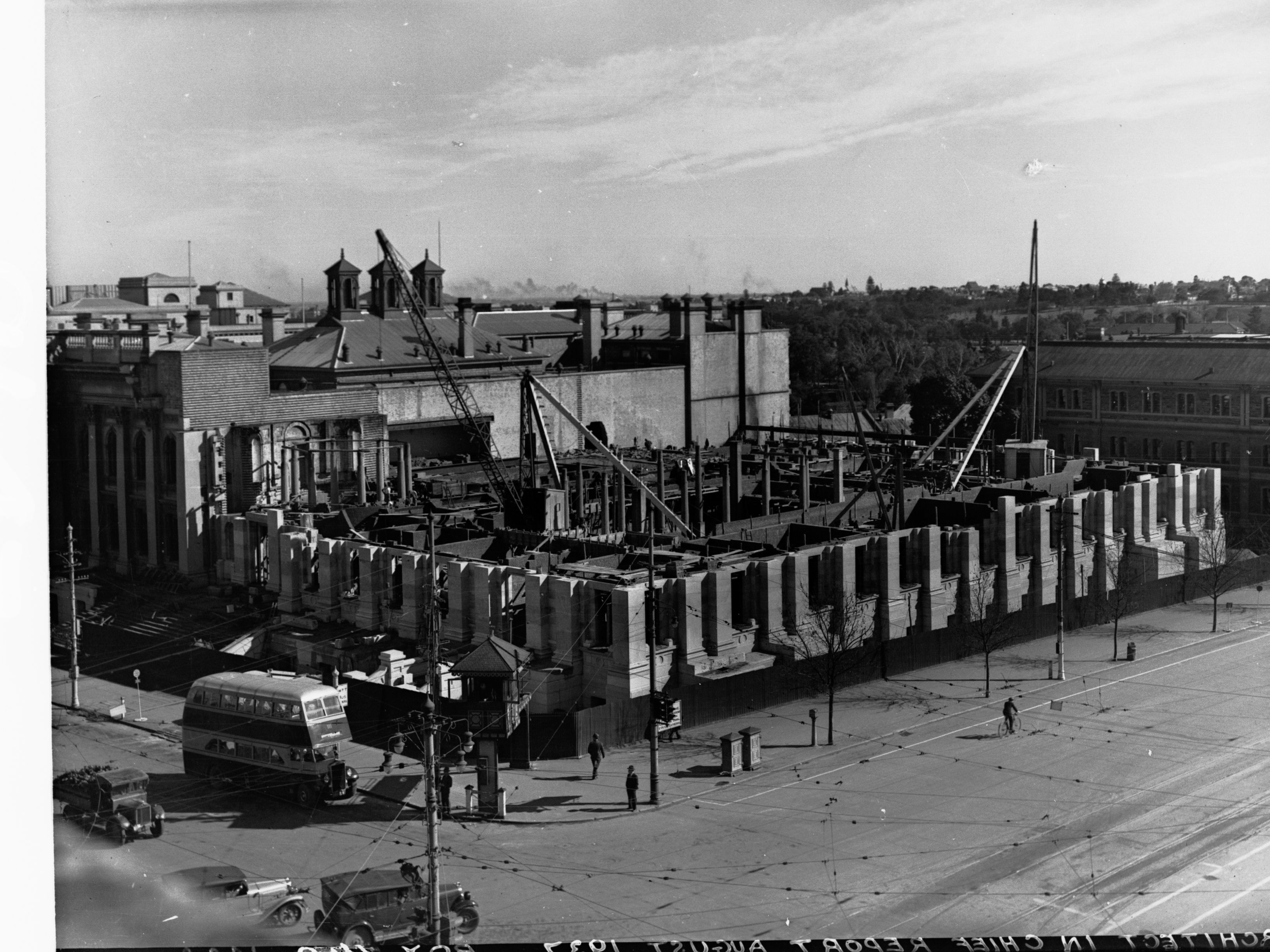
East Wing under construction, 1937

The proposals to complete Parliament House were revived in 1934 during preparations for South Australia's centenary celebrations in 1936, with the project promoted both as a commemorative initiative and as a source of employment during the Great Depression. Construction of the East Wing commenced in March 1936 after a £100,000 donation from John Langdon Bonython. Architect-in-Chief Alfred Edward Simpson prepared a revised design based on the 1913 plans, with A. Slater of Kilkenny appointed as the building contractor.

The East Wing, including the new Legislative Council chamber, was completed at a cost of £241,887. Parliament House was officially opened on 5 June 1939, marking the fiftieth anniversary of the opening of the West Wing. The ceremony was conducted by Governor-General Alexander Hore-Ruthven, 1st Earl of Gowrie, who had previously served as the state governor. Around 450 official guests representing governments and legislatures across the British Commonwealth attended, while approximately 6,000 spectators witnessed the ceremonial proceedings. The celebrations concluded with an afternoon tea for approximately 2,500 guests at Government House.

== Description and features ==
=== Architecture ===
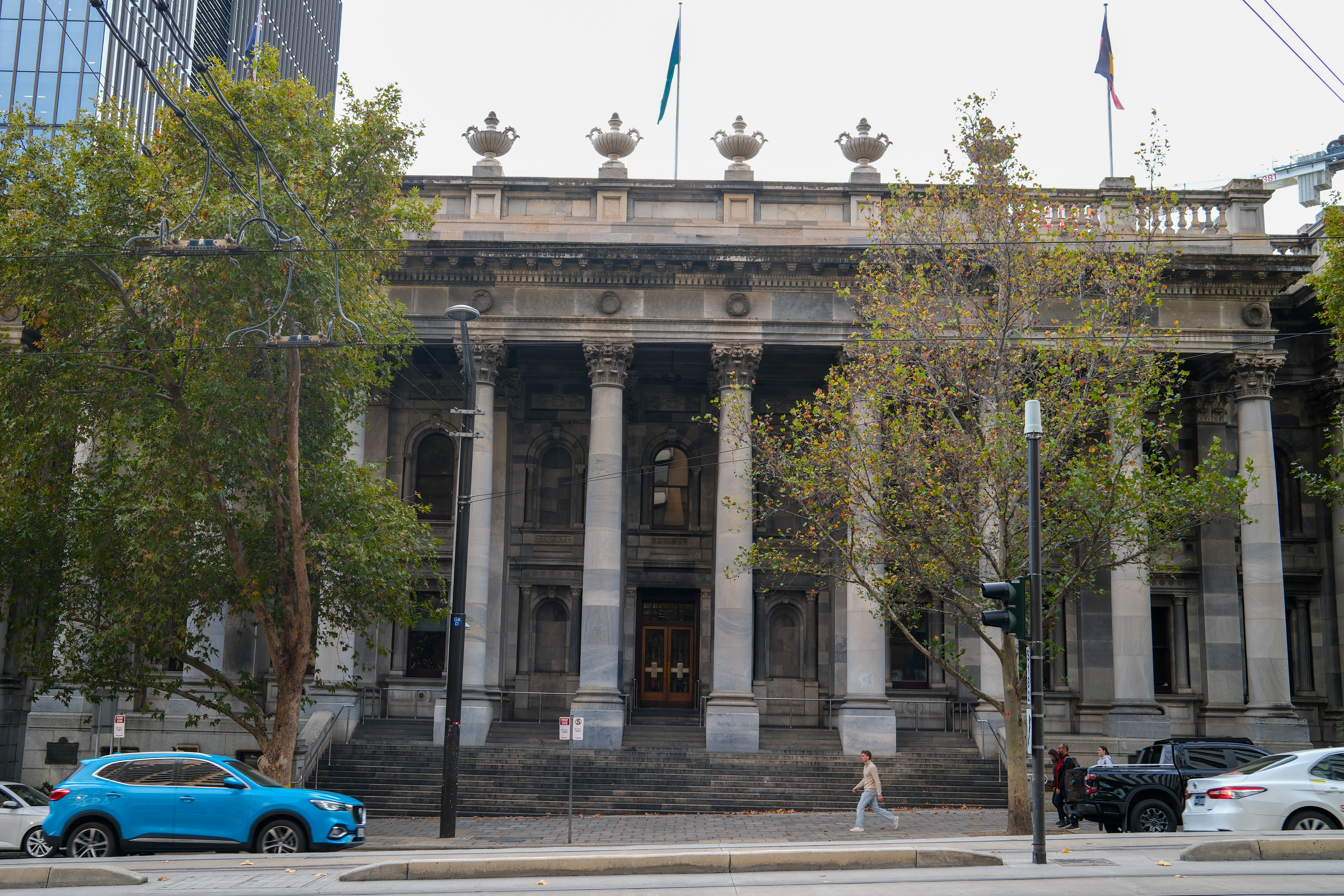
Front view showing colonnaded facade, 2026

The original design prepared by Wright and Tayler adopted the Victorian Academic Classical style and featured a central portico supported by Corinthian columns, a dome-capped tower, and smaller towers above projecting colonnaded wings. The completed Parliament House, located immediately east of the Old Parliament House, retained the Classical character of the earlier design but omitted the proposed central tower and dome. Constructed of granite with marble, the two-storey building has a granite basement, a principal façade with four Corinthian columns supporting the entrance portico, and a balustraded parapet surmounted by four urns. The principal entrance on North Terrace is approached by marble stairs flanked by cast-iron gas lamps manufactured by G. E. Fulton & Co., with marble also used throughout the internal staircases. The West Wing incorporated a mechanical ventilation system, gas lighting with provision for future electrical wiring, and electric call bells and messenger buttons. The East Wing includes a colonnaded south façade facing North Terrace, a complementary east façade facing King William Road, and a simplified north façade designed to harmonise with the West Wing. It accommodates the Legislative Council Chamber, Parliamentary Library, committee rooms, parliamentary offices, and Hansard offices. Cambrian flagstone from Mintaro was used for the corridor floors.

=== Parliamentary chambers and layout ===
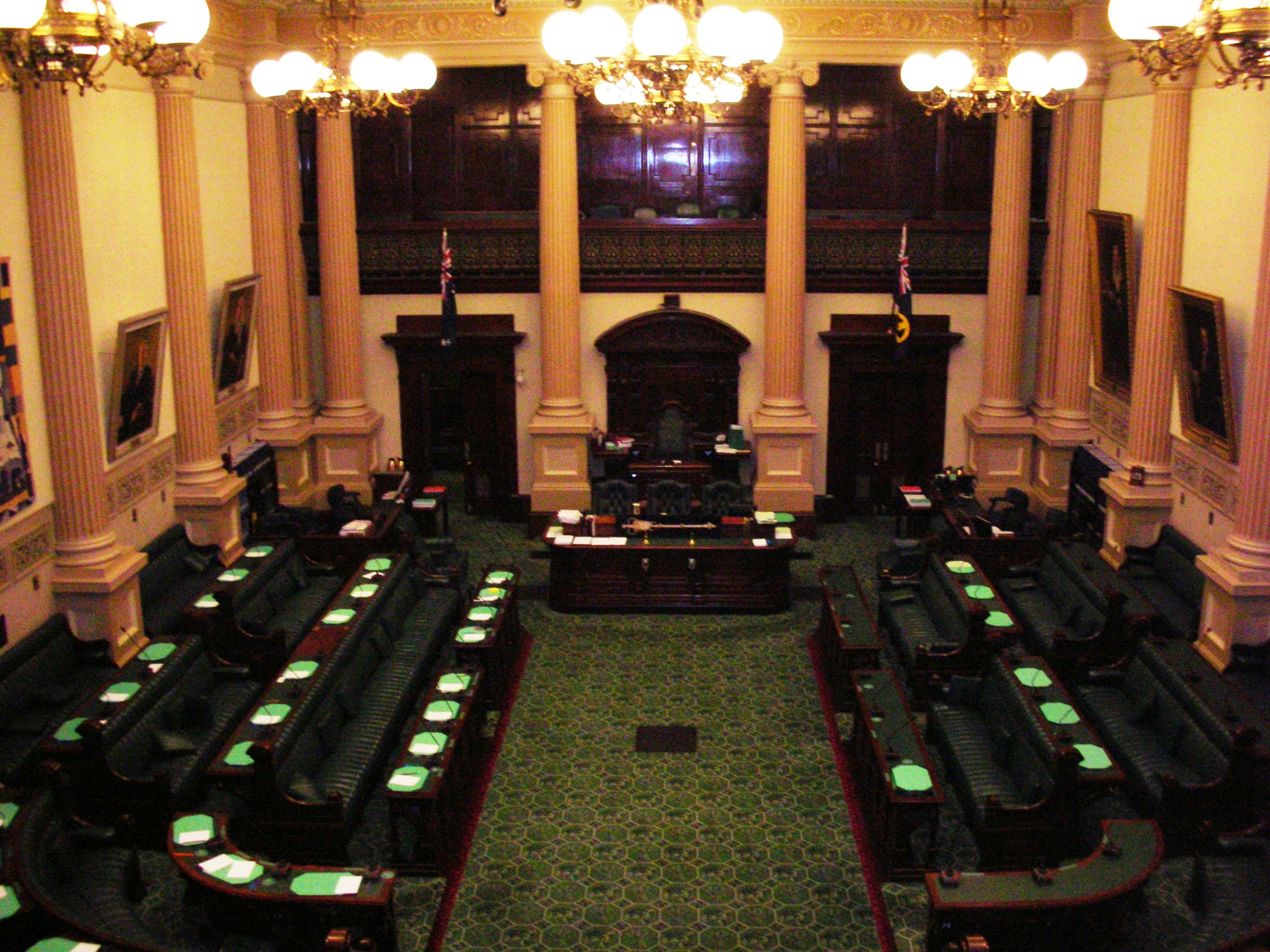
House of Assembly Chamber

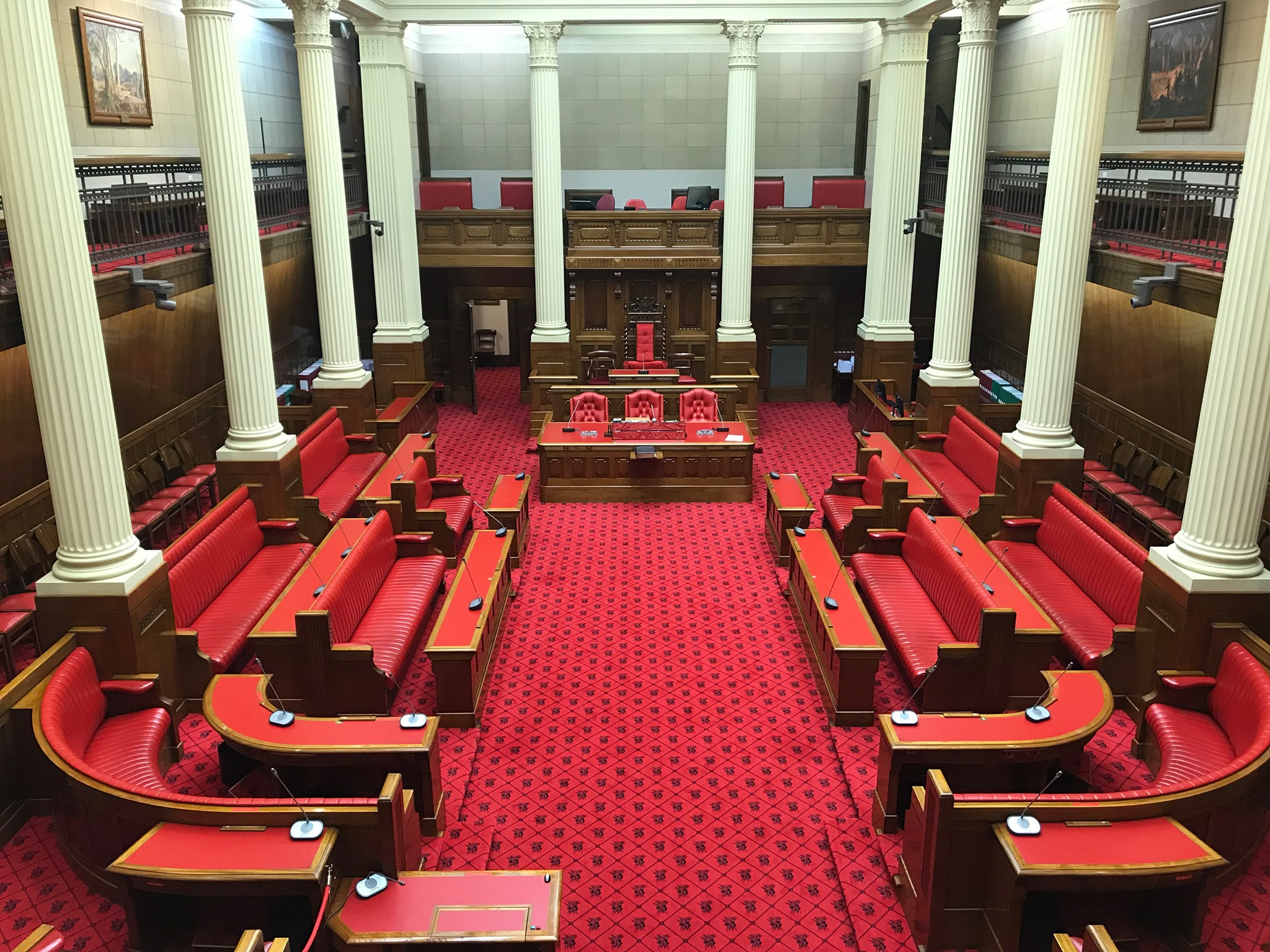
Legislative Council Chamber

In both chambers of Parliament House, seating and gallery arrangements are based on the Westminster system and organised according to parliamentary roles and access levels. The presiding officer's chair is located at the northern end of the chamber in an elevated position, with a table in front containing seats for the clerk, the chairman of committees, and the deputy clerk and serjeant-at-arms; a mace or black rod is placed on brackets above this table when the presiding officer is seated. Government members sit on the right-hand side of the presiding officer, arranged on the Treasury benches in order of precedence with the Premier closest to the presiding officer, while opposition members sit on the left-hand side, with crossbench members positioned at the southern end of the chamber in a horseshoe arrangement leading to the entrance gangway. Each member is allocated a fixed seat identified by a nameplate on the desk. Behind the presiding officer's chair are galleries for Hansard reporters in the centre and media representatives on either side, while additional galleries include a President or Speaker's Gallery accessible by permission of the presiding officer and a Strangers' Gallery open during sittings for public viewing.

The House of Assembly Chamber includes fluted columns supporting a panelled ceiling finished with gold leaf and illuminated by porcelain chandeliers. Portraits of former Speakers and Premiers are installed between the columns, and the Speaker's chair, made of American walnut, is positioned on a raised platform. Members' furniture is constructed from walnut with teak panels, which has green upholstery, and the carpeting incorporates South Australian motifs such as grapes, wheat, and wattle. A 'sword-strip' red carpet border is placed in front of the Treasury and opposition front benches and incorporates the Sturt's Desert Pea motif. Its use reflects a historical convention associated with parliamentary procedure in the House of Commons, where such floor markings were used to indicate a boundary between opposing members.

The Legislative Council Chamber is finished with Queensland maple panelling and red carpeting and is the same size as the House of Assembly Chamber. At the northern end is the Vice-Regal Throne, also known as the President's Throne, which has been in use since 1855. It is made of English oak with carved Gothic ornamentation and features red velvet upholstery. It rests on spiral columns, crowned with the Royal Arms in oak. The chamber is used for the opening of parliamentary sessions by the Sovereign's representative, such as the Governor or Lieutenant Governor, in the presence of both houses of Parliament.

=== Monuments, plaques, and commemorations ===
Two commemorative stones were unveiled in the East Wing on 23 December 1936 by Winston Dugan, 1st Baron Dugan of Victoria. One refers to Edward Gibbon Wakefield and reproduces a statement concerning the grant of self-government to the Province of South Australia once its population reached 50,000. The second records the completion of Parliament House as a commemoration of self-government and the centenary of the state, referring to approximately eighty years of responsible government. Following the completion of Parliament House in 1939, a stone lion that was formerly part of the Palace of Westminster was installed after being given as a present from the United Kingdom branch of the Empire Parliamentary Association.

On 22 March 1951, a plaque commemorating the 1897 Australasian Federal Convention was unveiled to the west of the lion statue, recording the convention and the drafting committee comprising John Downer, Edmund Barton, and Richard Edward O'Connor, with Charles Kingston presiding and Richard Chaffey Baker serving as chair. A bronze memorial plaque honouring Wakefield was unveiled by Willoughby Norrie, 1st Baron Norrie on 18 April 1952, followed by a commemorative plaque unveiled by Robert George on 26 April 1957 to mark the centenary of responsible government. A further plaque commemorates women's suffrage in South Australia, recognising the 1894 legislation granting women the right to vote and to stand for Parliament. During the centenary of women's suffrage, a time capsule was placed in a vault within Parliament House for opening during the bicentenary celebrations in 2094.

== Significant events ==
Between March and May 1897, the Proceedings of the Australasian Federal Convention were recorded at Parliament House during the constitutional convention held in Adelaide. It was the site from which the end of the Second Boer War was proclaimed in 1902, and the signing of the Armistice of 11 November 1918 was announced at Parliament House. During construction of the East Wing, Winston Dugan, 1st Baron Dugan of Victoria proclaimed the accession of Edward VIII at Parliament House on 22 January 1936, followed by the proclamation of the accession of George VI on 14 December 1936. In 1952, the accession of Elizabeth II was formally proclaimed in South Australia at Parliament House.

On 24 July 1980, Parliament House was entered into the South Australian Heritage Register. The former and new Parliament Houses were inscribed on the Australian National Heritage List on 26 January 2006, which notes the national importance of these buildings in terms of male, female and aboriginal suffrage and that this houses the Women's Suffrage Petition of 1894. In April 2019, six of the 48 original design drawings from the 1930s were discovered in cylindrical tubes in a waste bin by a member of the public in Melbourne. On 11 September 2022, the accession of Charles III was proclaimed in South Australia at Parliament House by Governor Frances Adamson.

== Gallery ==
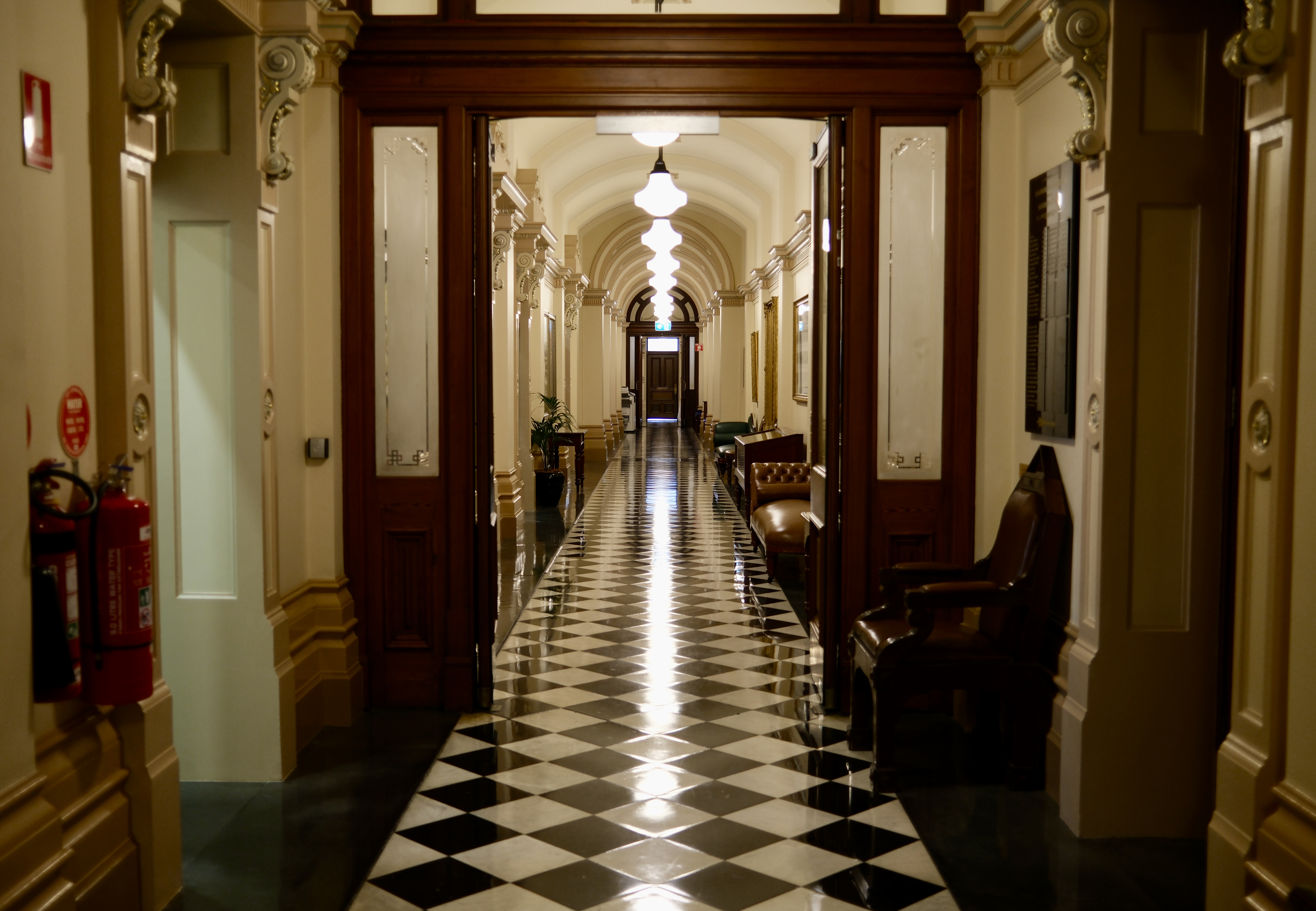
Corridor in the West Wing, 2026

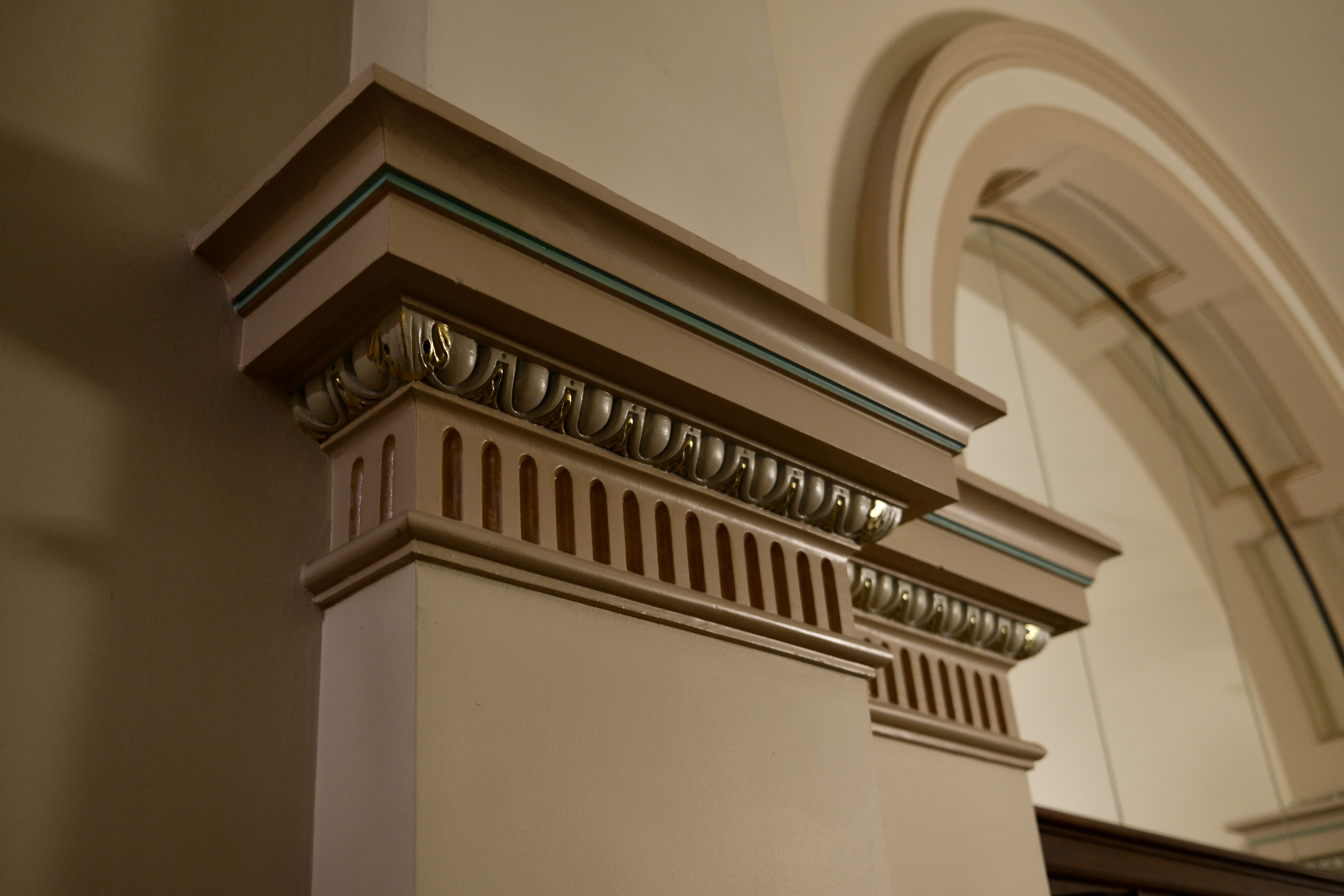
Change in wall design between the West and East Wings, 2026

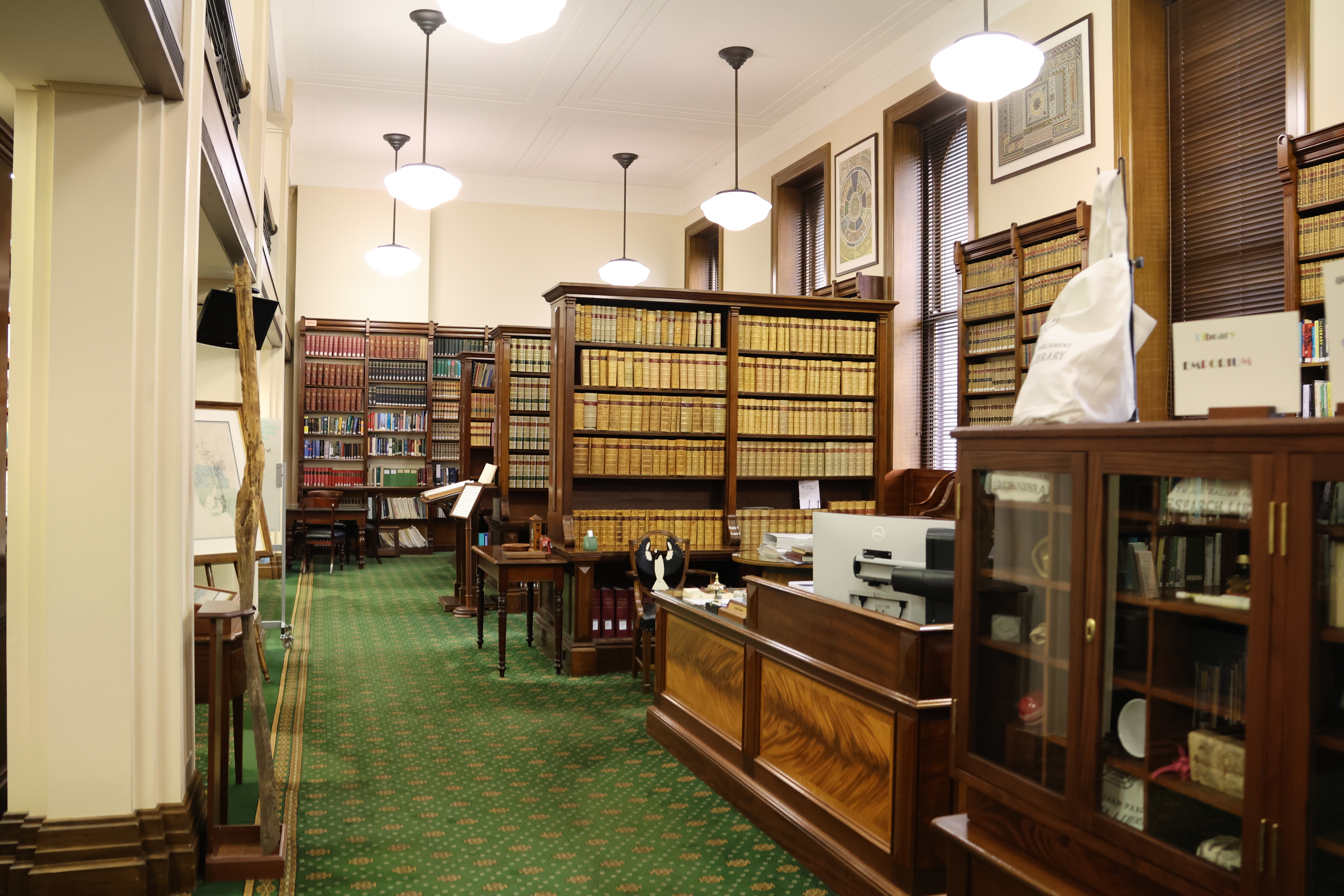
Parliamentary Library in the East Wing, 2025

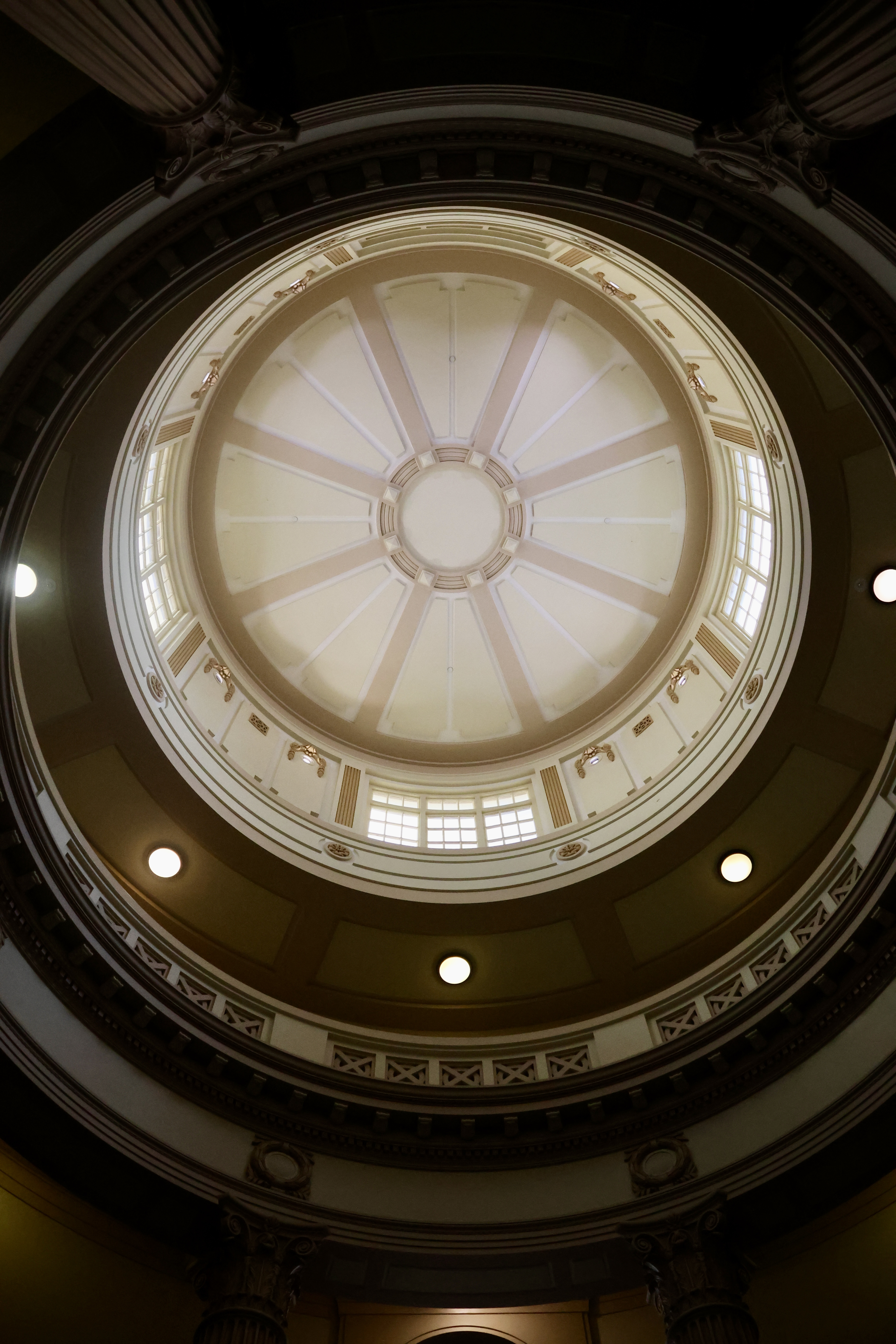
Ceiling of the main foyer creating the illusion of a dome, 2025

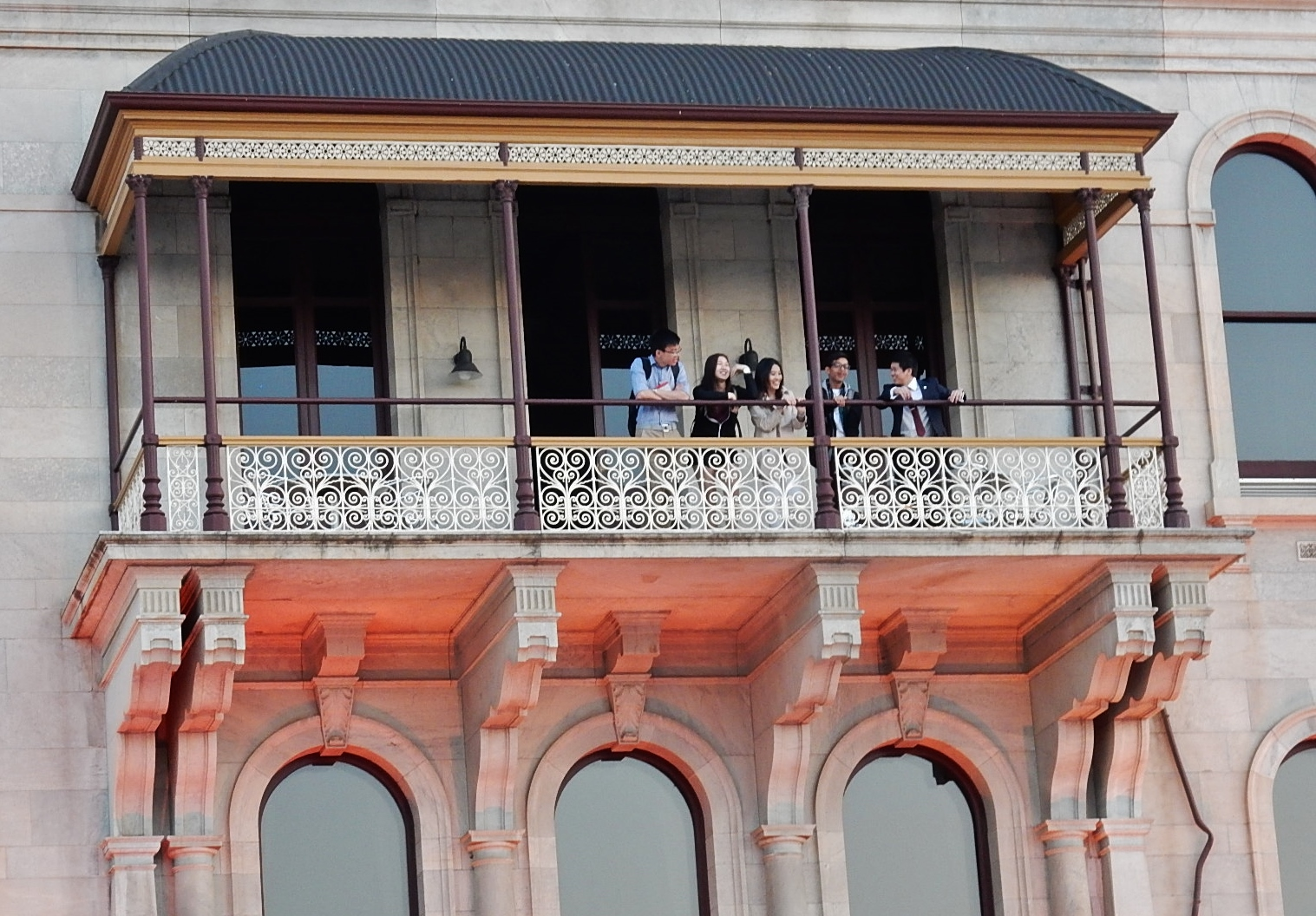
Balcony on the northern façade of Parliament House, 2015

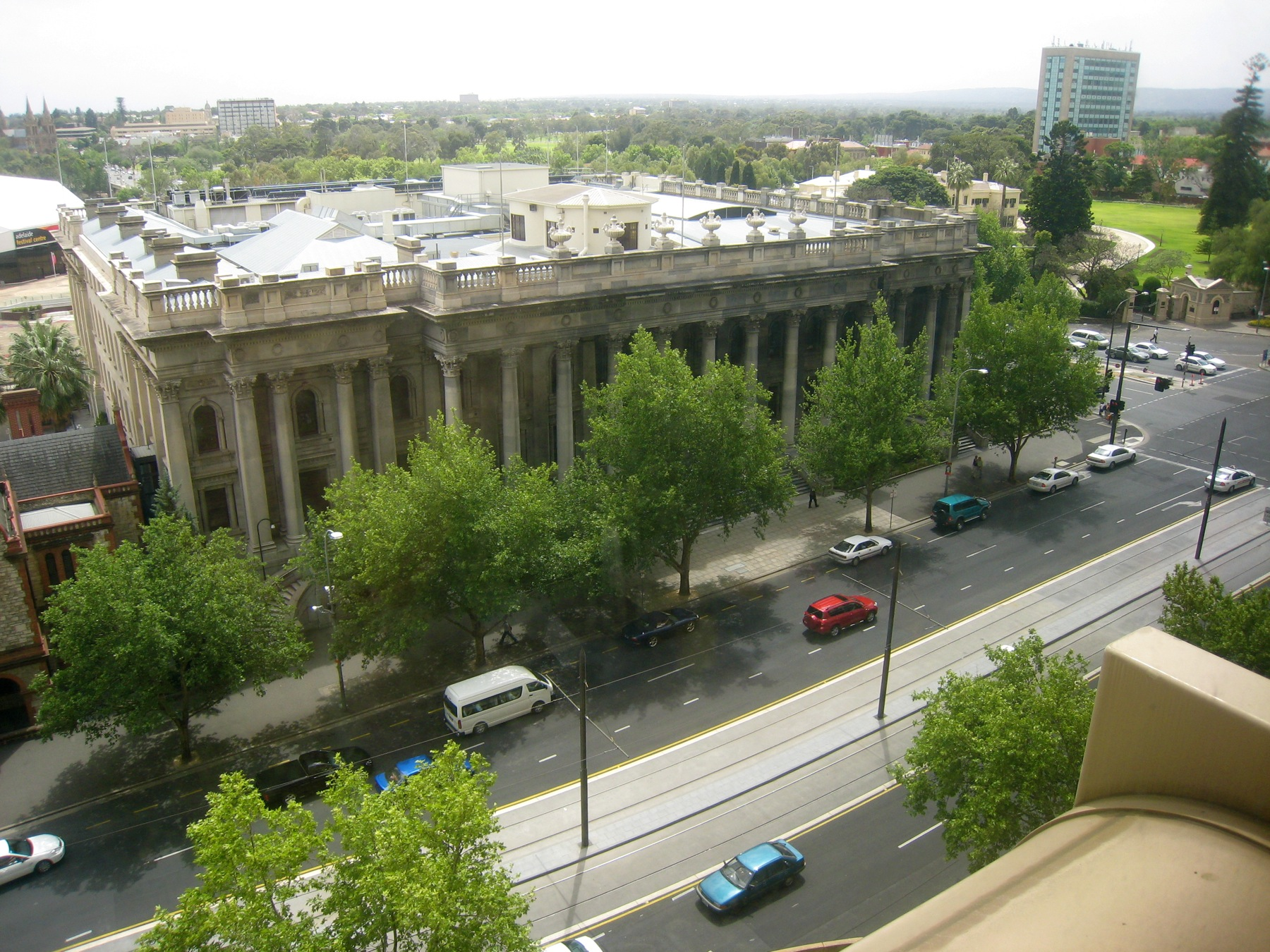
Top view of Parliament House, 2006
