= Dorothy Kell Finnis =

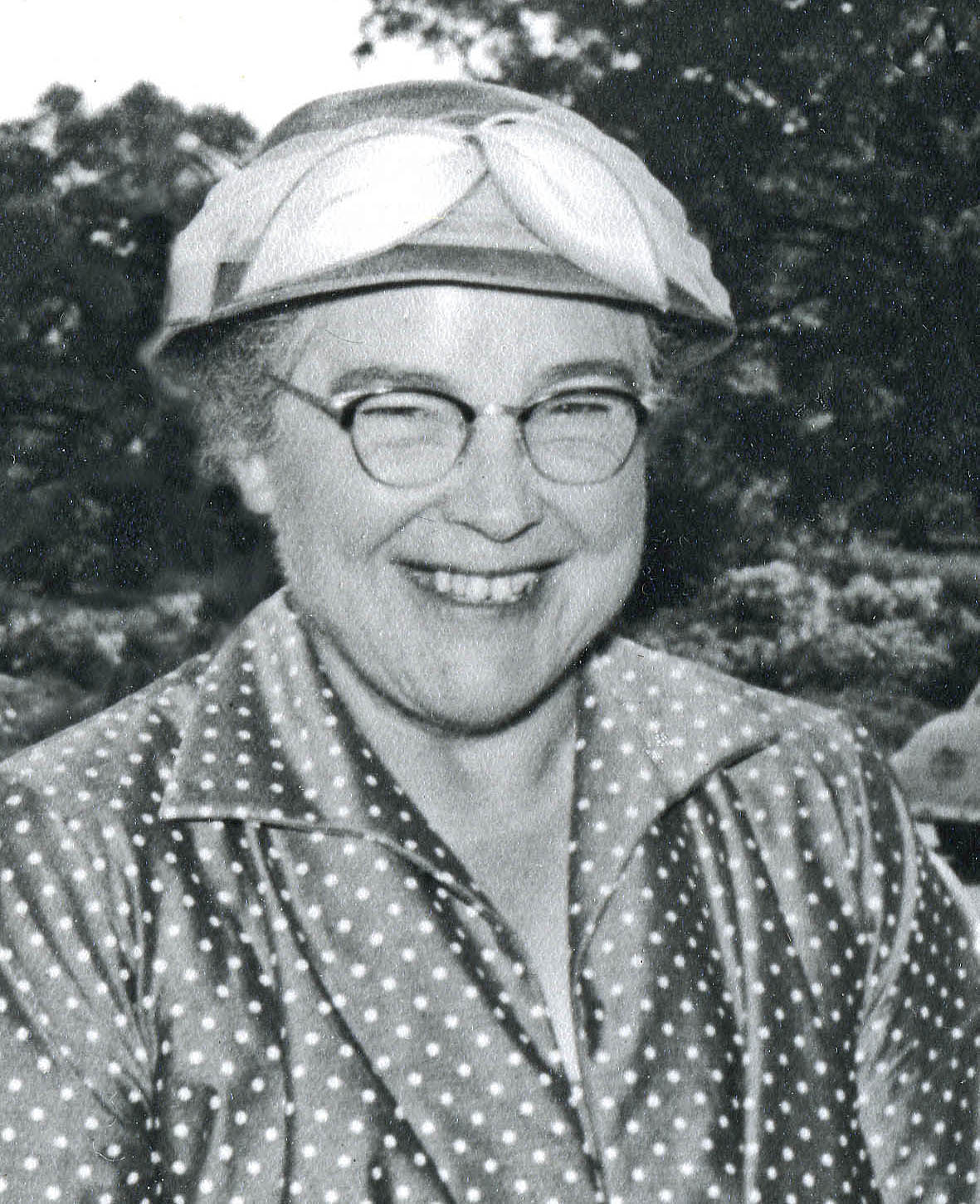

Dorothy Mary Kell ("Mollie") Finnis MBE, née Simpson (10 March 1903 – 19 May 1970), earlier known as Mary Kell Simpson was one of South Australia's first physiotherapists, and known for her treatment of children afflicted with poliomyelitis.

== Early life and education ==
Dorothy was born in Unley Park, South Australia, a daughter of architect Alfred Edward Simpson and his wife Frances Isabella Simpson, née Kell. She was educated at Walford House School where she was head prefect and editor of the school magazine.

== Career ==
In 1924, she qualified for a diploma from the South Australian branch of the Australasian Massage Association and opened a private physiotherapy practice which she maintained until a few weeks before her death. She was in 1958 a foundation member of the Physiotherapy Society of South Australia.

For twenty years she worked part-time at the Adelaide Children's Hospital, where she encountered many cases of infantile anterior poliomyelitis, an acute infectious viral disease affecting the brain and spinal cord, causing weakness, paralysis, and wasting of muscle, for which the classic treatment was bed rest and immobilization of affected limbs. Finnis however was convinced of the efficacy of treatments espoused by Sister Kenny, of actively re-educating individual muscles. She made a major contribution during the polio epidemic of 1937–1938 and later.

She served on several committees of the Crippled Children's Association of South Australia and was president from 1945 to 1957 of the Spastic Children's Parents' Group, later known as the Crippled Children's Auxiliary (Spastic Group).

Between 1944 and 1964, Finnis gave lectures on physiotherapy at the University of Adelaide and supervised practical classes in paediatrics at the Children's Hospital. She was from 1952 to 1965 the university's representative on the Physiotherapists' Board of South Australia.

== Recognition ==
- Dorothy Kell Finnis was appointed M.B.E. in 1953 in recognition of her services as President of the Crippled Children's Auxiliary (Spastic Centre), and invested by the Queen during her 1954 Australian tour.
- She was in 1965 made a life member of the Children's Hospital house committee in recognition of her service dating from 1948.

== Other interests ==
Finnis was a knowledgeable music lover, having studied piano at an advanced level, and was from 1932 a member of Adelaide's Tatlers Club, a literary society.

She was a regular church-goer, an adherent of the Church of England and, with her husband, a foundation member of the Friends of St Peter's Cathedral (founded 1932), and active in that group until 1954.

== Personal ==
Dorothy Simpson married the widowed Rev., later Canon, Horace Percy Finnis (died 1960) on 6 January 1945. The reverend gentleman, apart from his other religious duties, served as organist of St. Peter's Cathedral, having succeeded J. M. Dunn in 1936. They lived at the cathedral vicarage, moving to Rose Park in 1955. They had no children. She died in hospital of myocardial infarction and her remains were buried in the North Road cemetery.

She was not related to South Australia's Simpson family of industrialists, although Audrey Abbie, née Simpson, (1917–2014) of that family, was a physiotherapist by profession.
