= List of ordinances of the Legislative Council of Western Australia from 1851 =

This is a list of ordinances of the Legislative Council of Western Australia for the year 1851.

== 1851 ==
Short title, or popular name	Citation	Royal assent
Long title
	14 Vict. No. 17	16 May 1851
An Ordinance to make provision for the Conveyance of Mails from Port to Port within the limits of the Colony of Western Australia.
	14 Vict. No. 18	21 May 1851
An Ordinance for the better Apprehension of Offenders who shall have escaped to parts within the Territory of Western Australia from any other of the Australian Colonies.
	14 Vict. No. 19	16 May 1851
An Ordinance for better regulating the Inspection of Weights and Measures.
	14 Vict. No. 20	16 May 1851
An Ordinance for the establishment of further Precautionary Regulations for the Port of Fremantle.
	14 Vict. No. 21	16 May 1851
An Ordinance to limit the number of Persons required to act as a Grand Jury in remote Districts of the Colony of Western Australia.
Fremantle Prison Site Ordinance 1851 (repealed)	14 Vict. No. 22	16 May 1851
An Ordinance to vest the Site of the Convict Prison at Fremantle in certain Officers in Trust for Her Majesty, her Heirs and Successors for ever. (Repealed by Fremantle Prison Site Act 1902 (2 Edw. VII. No. 7))
	14 Vict. No. 23	21 May 1851
An Ordinance for the appropriation of the Revenue for the Year One thousand Eight Hundred and Fifty-two. (Repealed by Statute Law Revision Act 1964 (No. 61))
	14 Vict. No. 24	21 May 1851
An Ordinance to prevent vexatious Proceedings in certain Cases of unavoidable Trespass.
	14 Vict. No. 25	21 May 1851
An Ordinance to provide a more suitable mode of inflicting punishment for Drunkenness.
Towns Improvement Ordinance 1851 (repealed)	14 Vict. No. 26	27 May 1851
An Ordinance for the further Improvement of Towns, and the greater security of Life and Property therein. (Repealed by Towns Improvement Amending Ordinance 1852 (15 Vict. No. 9))
	15 Vict. No. 1	17 November 1851
An Ordinance to provide for the payment of certain unforeseen expenses during the Year 1851. (Repealed by Statute Law Revision Act 1964 (13 Eliz. II. No. 61))
	15 Vict. No. 2	17 November 1851
An Ordinance for restricting the Responsibility of the Sheriff of Western Australia.
	15 Vict. No. 3	17 November 1851
An Ordinance to naturalize Charles Francois Tondurt, Samuel Augustus Wallace, and Solomon Drolt.
	15 Vict. No. 4	17 November 1851
An Ordinance for the Naturalization of the Right Reverend Jose Maria Benedict Serra.

== Sources ==
- "legislation.wa.gov.au".
