= Finniss River =

Finniss River is the name of two rivers in Australia, both named after colonial surveyor Boyle Travers Finniss.

- Finniss River (Northern Territory) flows west into Fog Bay southwest of Darwin
- Finniss River (South Australia) flows east from the Mount Lofty Ranges into Lake Alexandrina

== See also ==
- Fog Bay and Finniss River Floodplains
