= H. P. Finnis =

Australian Anglican priest and organist

Horace Percy Finnis MA (17 April 1883 – 1960) was an Australian Anglican priest and organist in Victoria and South Australia.

== History ==
Finnis was born in Claremont, Tasmania, the eldest child and only son of the Reverend Herbert Robert Finnis (c. 1854–9 January 1936) and his wife Augusta Felicia Finnis, née Percy (c. 1854–29 May 1901), who married in Rokeby, Tasmania, on 11 April 1882. Herbert Finnis was rector of the Church of St John the Baptist, Hobart, from 1883 to 1902 and of Deloraine, Tasmania, from 1902 to 1908. He married again, to Edith Kate Norris (1880–1951) on 6 January 1903 (Feast of the Epiphany). He was warden of St Wilfrid's College and rector of Cressy (1908–1921), rector of Longford (1921–1923) then chaplain of the diocesan mission (1917–1926). He was an honorary canon of St David's Cathedral, Hobart (1921–1927). He then left for England where he served as curate in charge of St Martin's Church, Salisbury (1926–1927) and rector of Nevendon in the Diocese of Chelmsford (1927-1936).

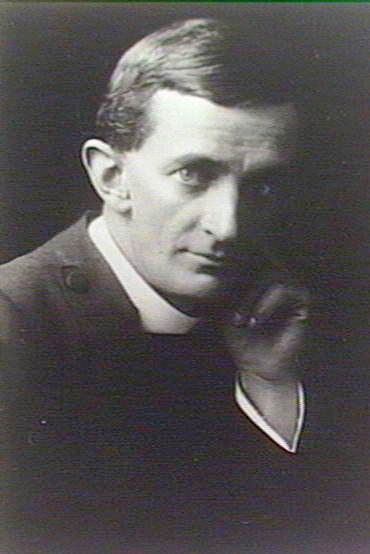
Finnis c. 1918

Finnis was educated in Tasmania and then at Brighton Grammar School and Trinity College, University of Melbourne, graduating MA in 1911. He was ordained deacon in 1907 and priest in 1908. In February 1908 he was appointed assistant curate and choirmaster of St John's Church, Toorak.

He married in 1909 and had three children.

He was appointed to the church at Meredith, Victoria, around August 1911.

=== Move to Adelaide ===
In January 1918 he succeeded the Revd Rupert P. A. Hewgill as rector of St John's Church, Adelaide. He started a day school in May 1918, which prospered, and by his enthusiasm and example helped build up the men's group.

He was appointed precentor of St. Peter's Cathedral and bishop's vicar in September 1927 in succession to Dr. W. Somerville Milne and was succeeded at St. John's by the Rev. E. A. North Ash, of St Mary's Church, Waverley, Sydney. J. M. Dunn had been organist and choirmaster since November 1891, and when he retired, just a few weeks before his death in March 1936, Finnis took over the dual role. He was appointed Canon around April 1946.

He retired in 1955.

=== Life in music ===
Finnis was described as 'an exceptional pianist', and his wife was a fine violinist, and while at university they notably played together. He passed his Bachelor of Music in 1929.

While a churchman in Victoria he was organist of St Andrew's Church, Brighton, then choirmaster of St John's Church, Toorak. In 1933 he founded, in Adelaide, Australia's first branch of the School of English Church Music, and served as its hon. secretary. From 1927 he served as precentor and from 1936 organist of St Peter's Cathedral as well as teaching music at Pulteney Grammar School.

He composed music for a Nativity play a recessional hymn an anthem and hymn tunes.

== Family ==
Finnis married violinist (Marion) Dora Barrow (24 June 1880 – 24 February 1944) on 11 October 1909 in Brighton, Victoria. He married again, to Dorothy Kell Simpson (10 March 1903 – 19 May 1970) in Adelaide on 6 January 1945. He had three children:

- Dora Felicia Finnis (1911 – 7 April 1932)
- Maurice Meredith Steriker Finnis MA (6 August 1914 in Meredith, Victoria – 13 October 1995) married Margaret Mackellar Stewart MA in Adelaide on 11 August 1939 and had four children and divorced in 1976. He was a senior lecturer in Philosophy at the University of Adelaide.
- Lynette Elizabeth Finnis (May 1916 – ) married Charles Everson Gardner, son of Walter Everson Gardner of Broken Hill in July 1938
