= Carl Muecke (editor) =

German-born clergyman, plant pathologist and German-language newspaper editor

Carl Wilhelm Ludwig Muecke (16 July 1815 – 4 January 1898), occasionally written Mücke and frequently referred to as "Dr Muecke", was a German-born clergyman, plant pathologist and German-language newspaper editor in the colony of South Australia. In 1869 he left for the neighbouring colony of Victoria.

== History ==
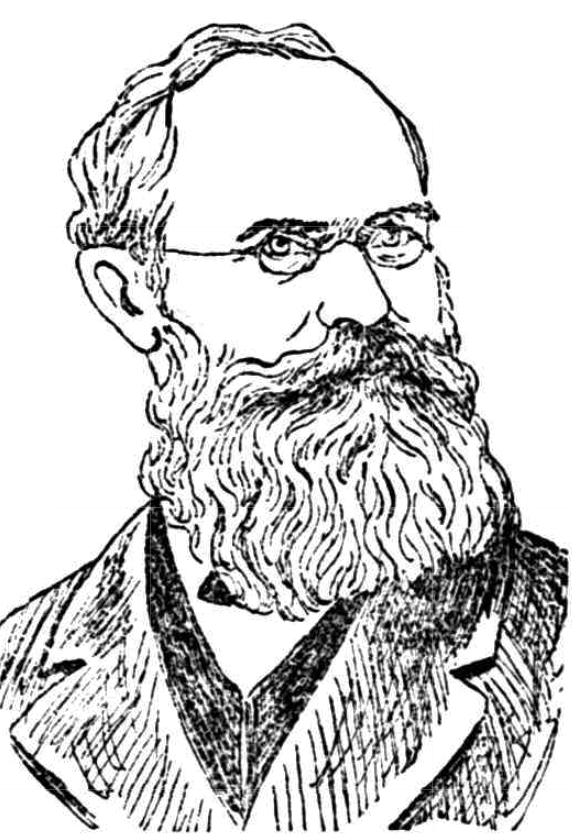
Carl Muecke

Muecke was born in Möckern, near Magdeburg, and was originally destined for a career in mining, which he studied at Freiberg, but after experiencing an accident in the mines, his father sent him to the University of Bonn, where he took his degrees. He served for a time as an observer on the Luxembourg border during the 1831 war between Belgium and Holland. He began teaching chemistry, and became an activist for the cause of compulsory education in State schools. He was an excellent speaker, and much in demand at the Handwerkerverein (de), a workers' education society in Berlin. One of Muecke's brothers established a Liedertafel in association with the Verein, which after his death erected a monument to his memory.

During the repressive Eichhorn ministry Muecke published some anti-authoritarian pamphlets, for which two of his fellows were punished. He moved to Berlin, where he had a hand in editing educational year-books.

Following the Revolutions of 1848, Muecke left Germany for South Australia aboard Princess Louise, arriving in August 1849. Also on board were two of the Schomburgk brothers: Otto Alfred Carl Schomburgk and his wife Maria Charlotte Schomburgk (née Von Selchow) and Richard Moritz Schomburgk, and Pauline Henriette Schomburgk (née Kneib), who were married at sea. He was naturalized as a British subject in September 1849, one of the few times his name was written as Mücke.

Muecke was one of a number of influential German-speaking residents — such as Ludwig Becker, Hermann Beckler, William Blandowski, Amalie Dietrich, Wilhelm Haacke, Diedrich Henne, Gerard Krefft, Friedrich Krichauff, Johann Luehmann, Johann Menge, Ludwig Preiss, Carl Ludwig Christian Rümker (a.k.a. Ruemker), Moritz Richard Schomburgk, Richard Wolfgang Semon, Karl Theodor Staiger, George Ulrich, Eugene von Guérard, Robert von Lendenfeld, Ferdinand von Mueller, Georg von Neumayer, and Carl Wilhelmi — who brought their "epistemic traditions" to Australia, and not only became "deeply entangled with the Australian colonial project", but also were "intricately involved in imagining, knowing and shaping colonial Australia" (Barrett, et al., 2018, p.2).

He first settled as a farmer near Gawler, but agriculture had no great attraction for him, and in 1859 he accepted an invitation to serve as pastor of the Lutheran Church at Tanunda, and shortly afterwards settled in that town. Over the next twenty years he also served several other Lutheran congregations: Lyndoch, Concordia (5 km ENE of Gawler), Schoenfeld (near Freeling) and King's Belt (near Sheaoak Log). At each of these pastorates he was closely associated with the church school and intellectual life of these towns. He was at the forefront of agitation for equal voting rights for naturalized Germans, and gave popular and stimulating lectures on scientific subjects.

He was of great assistance to Sir Robert Torrens in promoting the Real Property Act which, thanks to Dr Ulrich Hübbe, was largely based on the system used in the Hanse towns, and helped organise a festival at Tanunda in honour of Sir Robert after the Act was passed.

For years he took a very practical interest in "takeall" and "red rust", significant diseases of wheat, studying the soil and roots under a microscope, and discovered parasites that could have been responsible.

His MA degree was conferred ad eundem by the University of Adelaide in 1877.

== Journalism ==
In late 1849 Muecke, together with Otto Schomburgk and Gustav Droege (Note: Gustav Droege arrived in SA in December 1847 aboard Hermann von Beckerath, left for New Zealand around 1853 and returned to South Australia around August 1861, and in New South Wales in 1866 as "Thomas Myers".) founded the Suedaustralische Zeitung, a German-language weekly newspaper, using Roman type (and replacing umlauted letters with their two-letter equivalent), perhaps as a rejection of tradition, or that being the only typeface available. The following year it was printed in traditional black letter type as Südaustralische Zeitung. Throughout the history of the paper Muecke had a considerable attachment in its various phases:

Südaustralische Zeitung absorbed a Tanunda paper (name not known) in early 1851.
The paper was for a time printed in Adelaide by the South Australian Register, and for several years was not published at all due to the Victorian gold rush. It was re-established in the mid-to-late 1850s by different owners, but better information is hard to find.
The Südaustralische Zeitung was in 1859 sold to Rudolf Reimer ( – 7 April 1860), who founded Adelaider Deutsche Zeitung in April 1851, but continued publication in Tanunda as a separate title.
The Süd Australische Zeitung was in late 1862 sold to Basedow, Barton, and Eimer, trading as George Eimer & Co. Contrary to promises and expectations, they immediately moved production from Tanunda to Adelaide. The partnership was dissolved on 31 January 1863 and Eimer became sole owner.
Frederick Basedow (Muecke's son-in-law) and C. H. Barton retaliated in 1863 with a new Tanunda publication, the Tanunda Deutsche Zeitung, edited by Muecke until 1869, when he left Tanunda for the neighbouring colony of Victoria, according to one report to set up a branch office which failed to thrive, and returned to Tanunda the following year. Barton was later to become bankrupt and in 1867 fled to Maryborough, Queensland, owing substantial sums to his Tanunda backers.
In January 1870 Eimer & Co. founded the Australische Zeitung, and Süd Australische Zeitung continued to be published until December 1874, when it was absorbed into Australische Zeitung. Wilhelm Eggers (c. 1815–1882), from roughly 1855–1865 owner-editor of the Adelaider Deutschen Zeitung, was part-owner and editor from at least 1871 to 1875. Around 1876, now living in Adelaide, Muecke was appointed chief editor.

== Later years ==
In November 1869, in anticipation of Muecke's imminent departure for Melbourne, the Evening Journal published a detailed biography of "one of [South Australia's] most prominent representatives of German culture".

By 1879 he had returned, unheralded, to South Australia, living at Semaphore, then around 1890, thinking the mountain air would be beneficial to his health, he retired to Hahndorf. On his eightieth birthday a great celebration was held at the German Club in his honour.

== Recognition ==
- The flowering plant Goodenia mueckeana was named for him by Baron Ferdinand von Mueller.
- Dr Muecke was in 1870 awarded a £50 prize by the Victorian Board of Agriculture for his essay on "Takeall".

== Family ==
Muecke married Emilie Friedericka Meyerhoff (died 1851) in Germany. He married again, to Caroline (or Karoline) Schomburgk (died 15 November 1874), sister of Moritz Richard Schomburgk. (Note: His youngest daughter Hedwig Emma Victoria Witt died the following day.) He married one more time, to Marie Gehrke (died 1934) in 1887.

- Anna Clara Helena Muecke (c. 1840 – 19 June 1921) married (Friedrich August) Carl Schrader ( – 16 June 1860) in 1859. She married again, to Frederick Basedow in 1868
- Hugo Carl Emil Muecke (c. 1843 – 6 June 1929) married Margaret Elizabeth Julia Le Page ( – 1 November 1918) on 2 April 1863. They had a home "The Myrtles", Thorngate, South Australia. Among their children were:

- second son Alfred Eugen Muecke (13 September 1868 – 15 January 1886) was drowned with son of W. R. Cave while holidaying at Chowilla, the station of William Robertson
- fourth son Walter Le Page Muecke (16 June 1875 – 15 March 1894) died as result of accident at Roseworthy Agricultural College
- sixth son Francis Frederick Muecke (6 December 1879 – 14 April 1945), a noted surgeon, married Ada Crossley on 11 April 1905

- Eugen Victor Ottoman Muecke (c. 1843 – 20 February 1882) married Ida Henriette Mumme (13 October 1852 – 1923) in 1875; they had four children. He was a manager, National Bank. She was a sister of Carl Edmund Mumme, conductor of the Adelaide Liedertafel.
- Hedwig Emma Victoria Muecke (1851 – 16 November 1874) married Adolph Witt (c. 1835 – 12 August 1889) in 1867. A well-known stockbroker and president of the German Club, Witt died from a self-inflicted gunshot wound.

== Sources ==
- Barrett, L., Eckstein, L., Hurley, A.W. & Schwarz A. (2018), "Remembering German-Australian Colonial Entanglement: An Introduction", Postcolonial Studies, Vol.21, No.1, (January 2018), pp.1-5. doi:10.1080/13688790.2018.1443671
