= Carex preissii =

Scientific classification
- Kingdom: Plantae
- Clade: Tracheophytes
- Clade: Angiosperms
- Clade: Monocots
- Clade: Commelinids
- Order: Poales
- Family: Cyperaceae
- Genus: Carex
- Species: C. preissii

Binomial name
- Carex preissii Nees

Synonyms
- Carex thecata Boott

Species of grass-like plant

Carex preissii is a flowering plant in the sedge family, Cyperaceae, that is native to Western Australia.

The species was described by the botanist Christian Gottfried Daniel Nees von Esenbeck in 1846 as a part of the work Plantae Preissianae. The type specimen was collected by Ludwig Preiss.

The sedge is found along the coast in the Peel, South West, Great Southern and Goldfields-Esperance regions.
