= Juncus caespiticius =

- Juncus caespiticius in damp, sandy coastal habitat in New Zealand

Conservation status
- Declining (NZ TCS)

Scientific classification
- Kingdom: Plantae
- Clade: Tracheophytes
- Clade: Angiosperms
- Clade: Monocots
- Clade: Commelinids
- Order: Poales
- Family: Juncaceae
- Genus: Juncus
- Species: J. caespiticius

Binomial name
- Juncus caespiticius E.Mey.

Synonyms
- Homotypic Synonyms: Australojuncus caespiticius (E.Mey.) Záv.Drábk. & Proćków; Heterotypic Synonyms: Juncus caespiticius var. bracteatus Buchenau; Juncus similis Buchenau

Species of flowering plant

Juncus caespiticius, the grassy rush, is a species of flowering plant in the family Juncaceae, native to coastal areas of southern Australia and the North Island and South Island of New Zealand. It was described in 1846 by Ernst Heinrich Friedrich Meyer based on specimens collected in Western Australia by Ludwig Preiss. It usually grows in damp coastal areas, near fresh or slightly brackish water. It is considered to be At Risk - Declining in the New Zealand Threat Classification for vascular plants.

== Taxonomy ==
Juncus caespiticius is a species in the family Juncaceae. It was described by German botanist Ernst Heinrich Friedrich Meyer in 1846 in Johan Lehmann's book Plantae pressianae. The type specimen was collected by German-British botanist Ludwig Preiss in November 1839 at Canning, Perth, Western Australia.

== Distribution and habitat ==
Juncus caespiticius is native to New Zealand and Australia. In New Zealand, it is found in the North Island and South Island. In Australia, it is found in Western Australia, South Australia, New South Wales, Victoria and Tasmania. This species is usually found in coastal habitats, near damp areas or near the edges of brackish lagoons or streams, from 0 to 500 m above sea level.

== Conservation status ==
The species is listed as At Risk - Declining in the most recent assessment (2023) of the New Zealand Threatened Classification for plants. Its status was unchanged from the 2017 assessment, but worse than its 2012 assessment as Not Threatened.

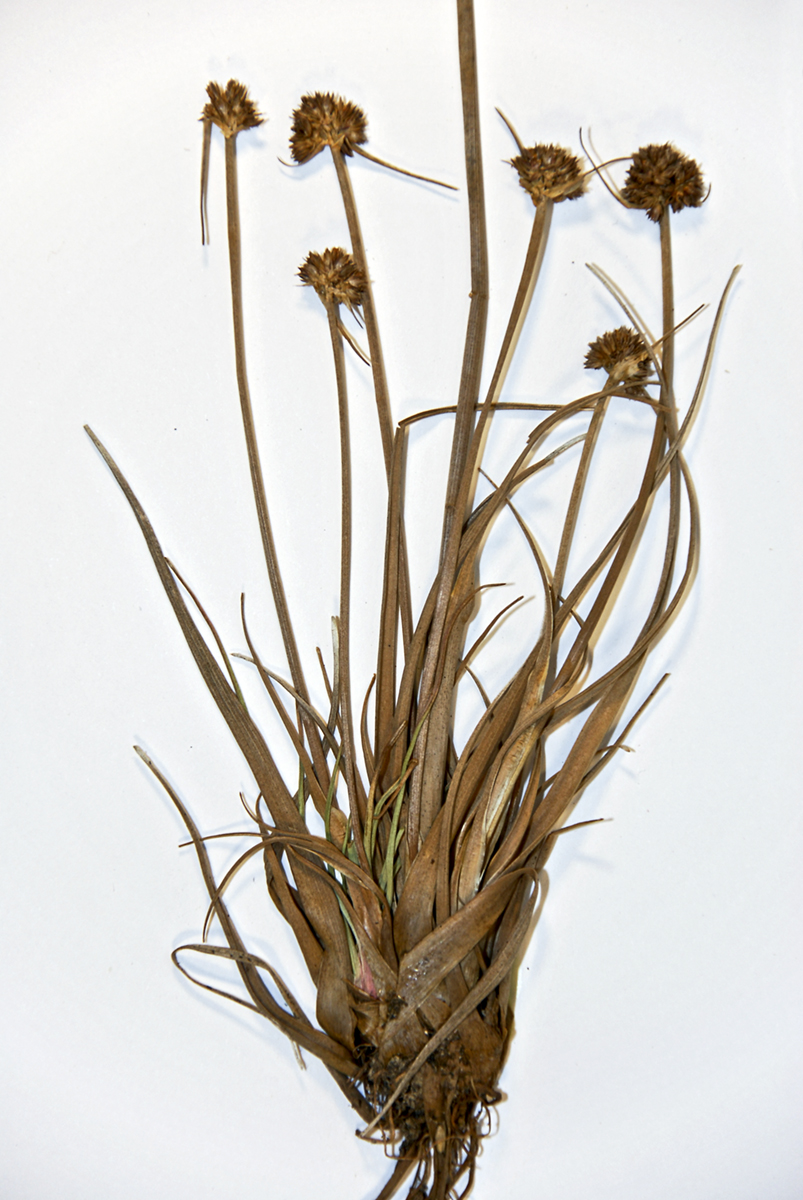
Herbarium specimen

In addition to qualifiers DPR ("Data Poor: Recognition"), DPS ("Data Poor: Size"), DPT ("Data Poor: Trend"), PD ("Partial Decline") and SO ("Secure overseas"), J. caespiticius also has the qualifier CI ("Climate impact"). The CI qualifier has been used by the Department of Conservation since 2021 to flag species in its conservation assessments that are "adversely affected by long-term climate trends and/or extreme climatic events."

Habit and sandy habitat

Whole plant

Flowers

Fruiting plant

Fruits
