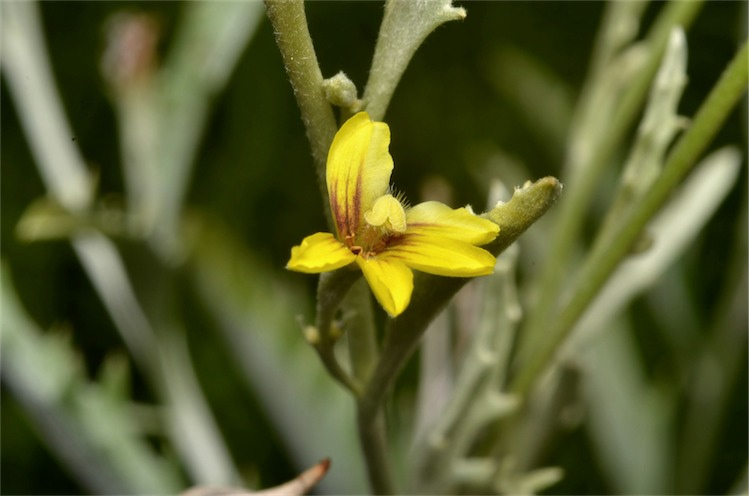
- In the ANBG

Scientific classification
- Kingdom: Plantae
- Clade: Tracheophytes
- Clade: Angiosperms
- Clade: Eudicots
- Clade: Asterids
- Order: Asterales
- Family: Goodeniaceae
- Genus: Goodenia
- Species: G. mueckeana

Binomial name
- Goodenia mueckeana F.Muell.

= Goodenia mueckeana =

Species of plant

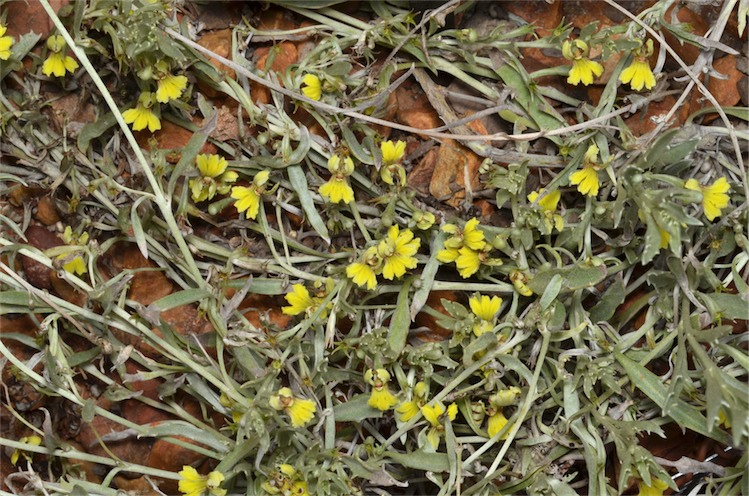
Habit

Goodenia mueckeana is a species of flowering plant in the family Goodeniaceae and is endemic to central Australia. It is an ascending, perennial herb with toothed, linear to egg-shaped leaves and racemes or thyrses of yellow flowers.

== Description ==
Goodenia mueckeana is an ascending, perennial herb that typically grows to a height of 20–50 cm (7.9–19.7 in) and is covered with greyish hairs. The leaves are linear to egg-shaped with toothed or pinnatisect edges, 30–70 mm (1.2–2.8 in) long and 4–10 mm (0.16–0.39 in) wide. The flowers are arranged in racemes or thyrses up to 250 mm (9.8 in) long on a peduncle 5–15 mm (0.20–0.59 in) long, with leaf-like bracts and linear bracteoles about 2 mm (0.079 in) long. The individual flowers are more or less sessile with linear sepals about 3 mm (0.12 in) long. The corolla is yellow, 9–12 mm (0.35–0.47 in) long, the lower lobes 4–5 mm (0.16–0.20 in) long with wings about 2 mm (0.079 in) wide. Flowering mainly occurs from May to September and the fruit is an oval capsule, about 10 mm (0.39 in) long.

== Taxonomy and naming ==
Goodenia mueckeana was first formally described in 1873 by Ferdinand von Mueller in Fragmenta Phytographiae Australiae. The specific epithet (mueckeana) honours Carl Muecke.

== Distribution and habitat ==
This goodenia grows in hummock grassland on sandplains and sand dunes in central Western Australia, the south-west of the Northern Territory and the far north-west of South Australia.

== Conservation status ==
Goodenia mueckeana is classified as "not threatened" by the Government of Western Australia Department of Parks and Wildlife and as of "least concern" under the Northern Territory Government Territory Parks and Wildlife Conservation Act 1976.
