= Mumme =

Mumme is a German surname. Notable people with the surname include

- Carl Edmund Mumme (1839–1919), choirmaster in Australia
- Hal Mumme (born 1952), American football coach
- Matt Mumme (born 1975), American college football coach
