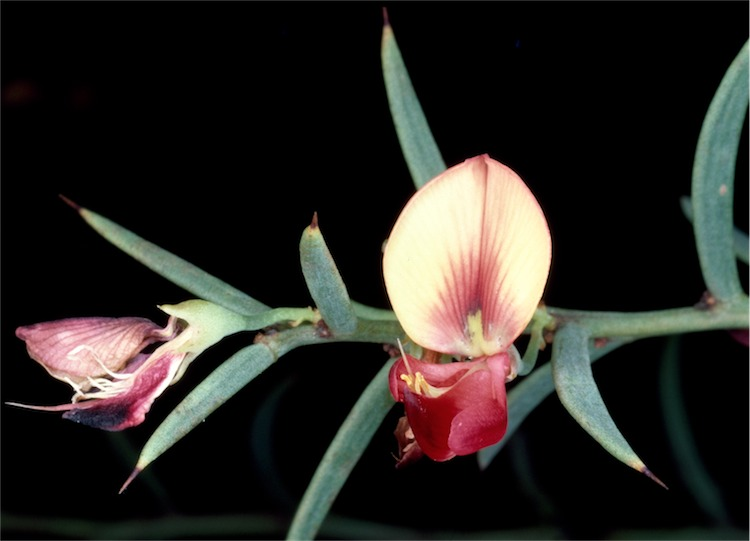
- In the Australian National Botanic Gardens

Scientific classification
- Kingdom: Plantae
- Clade: Tracheophytes
- Clade: Angiosperms
- Clade: Eudicots
- Clade: Rosids
- Order: Fabales
- Family: Fabaceae
- Subfamily: Faboideae
- Genus: Daviesia
- Species: D. preissii

Binomial name
- Daviesia preissii Meisn.

= Daviesia preissii =

Species of flowering plant

Daviesia preissii is a species of flowering plant in the family Fabaceae and is endemic to the south-west of Western Australia. It is a glabrous shrub with scattered, vertically flattened, tapering, narrowly egg-shaped to elliptic, sharply-pointed phyllodes and yellow and red flowers.

== Description ==
Daviesia preissii is a glabrous shrub, often low and spreading, typically 0.6–1 m (2 ft 0 in – 3 ft 3 in) high and 1 m (3 ft 3 in) wide. It has dull green, vertically flattened, tapering, narrowly egg-shaped or elliptic phyllodes 10–40 mm (0.39–1.57 in) long and 0.75–5 mm (0.030–0.197 in) wide that diverge from the branchlets at angles of 60–90°. The flowers are usually arranged singly or in pairs in leaf axils on a peduncle 0.5–2.5 mm (0.020–0.098 in) long, each flower on a pedicel 1.5–2.5 mm (0.059–0.098 in) long. The sepals are 3.0–4.5 mm (0.12–0.18 in) long with narrowly triangular lobes about 1.5 mm (0.059 in) long. The standard petal is broadly elliptic, 7.5–10 mm (0.30–0.39 in) long, 6.5–8 mm (0.26–0.31 in) wide, and yellow with a red tinge near the base. The wings are 7.5–12 mm (0.30–0.47 in) long and red, the keel 8.0–8.5 mm (0.31–0.33 in) long and red. Flowering mainly occurs from December to February and the fruit is a partly flattened, triangular pod 12–21 mm (0.47–0.83 in) long with the remains of the style attached.

== Taxonomy and naming ==
Daviesia preissii was first formally described in 1844 by Carl Meissner in Lehmann's Plantae Preissianae from specimens collected in 1841. The specific epithet (preissii) honours Ludwig Preiss, who collected the type specimens.

== Distribution and habitat ==
This daviesia grows in open forest or in kwongan heath on the Darling Range and in the far south-west of Western Australia as far east as Albany and the Stirling Range.

== Conservation status ==
Daviesia preissii is listed as "not threatened" by the Western Australian Government Department of Biodiversity, Conservation and Attractions.
