= Carl Püttmann =

German composer

Carl Püttmann (14 November 1843 – 12 January 1899), often referred to as Carl or Charles Puttmann, was a music teacher and composer of South Australia.

== History ==
Püttmann was born in Cologne (Köln), Prussia, the third son of Hermann Püttmann. His father was a man of considerable poetic ability on the literary staff of the Kölnische Zeitung (Cologne Gazette), but was prompted by the civil unrest of 1848–1849 to emigrate to England, and later to Melbourne, where he died on 27 December 1874. He was a prominent contributor to the local German newspapers, and published an account in German of the Burke and Wills expedition, several volumes of poetry, and in 1874 edited a history of the Franco-Prussian War of 1870–1871.

Püttmann studied violin under the best teachers in Victoria, and by 1858 was playing professionally. He accompanied the Lyster Opera Company on their first grand tour through New Zealand and Australia. On arrival in Adelaide in 1863 he decided to remain, and established himself as a teacher of music and singing. In 1865 he married a daughter of the Rev. Dr Carl Heinrich Loessel, and following the death of Wilhelm Spietschka on 21 January 1867 was appointed conductor of the Adelaide Liedertafel, a post he held for nearly 20 years, to be followed by C. E. Mumme in 1886. The first performance given by the Society under his baton was a comic opera Die Mordgrundbruck bei Dresden at the Theatre Royal in 1868; the first amateur opera given in Adelaide.

He was teacher of music at St. Peter's College, Prince Alfred College, and the Christian Brothers' College, as well as a large private practice. He was succeeded at PAC around 1875 by W. B. Chinner. Püttmann also gained a reputation as a composer; his Victorian Cantata was composed for the Adelaide Jubilee International Exhibition of 1887, and performed at the closing ceremony to great applause. It opened with variations on the theme of Song of Australia, and concluded with a fugue on God Save the Queen.

He was known as a fine violinist and was frequently called upon to accompany visiting soloists. A Register report of Kate Thayer's concert in 1882 read: —

Mr. Puttmann contributed greatly to the success of the evening by his skilful rendering of Ernst's violin solo Élégie in which, by his excellent bowing and double-stopping, he proved himself to be a master of the instrument.

Late December 1898 he was in a two-horse trap driven by E. W. Clarke with two others returning from the National Park, Belair to the city, when one of the horses tripped and the passengers were thrown to the ground. Carl suffered facial bruising and a severely swollen leg where perhaps a wheel had run over him, and appeared for a time to recover, but two weeks later he died of a coronary embolism at his home on South Road, Edwardstown. He was that day to have taken the train to Jamestown where he had some students. He was buried at Mitcham Cemetery. The Liedertafel sang at the grave the very chorus the late musician had taught them years before – Es ist bestimmt Gottes Rath by Ernst Freiherr von Feuchtersleben (1806–1849)

== Family ==
Püttmann married Maria Helene Loessel (died 1941) in 1866. She was a daughter of Rev. Dr. Carl Heinrich Conrad Loessel (30 October 1812 – 24 December 1879), a founder of the Lutheran Church in Flinders Street, Adelaide, and pastor of the church at Lobethal. It is likely, but not certain, that their children adopted the Anglicized version of their surname:

- Henriette Franziska Maria Puttmann (1867–1905) married John George Kelly in 1891. He was a vigneron of Maclaren Vale. She was the second woman to graduate Mus. Bac. in South Australia.
- Alexander Hermann Heinrich Puttmann (1869–1895), one of two sons who showed great musical talent then died of tuberculosis
- Ernst Adolph Puttmann (1873–1964) married Elizabeth Cornelius in 1907
- Alfred Waldemar Alexander Puttmann (1876–1897), the other son who showed great musical talent then died of tuberculosis
- Anna Ella Georgina Puttmann (1878–1962)
- Otto Wilhelm Loessel Puttmann (1880–1956) married Mabel Elizabeth March in 1912
