= William Blandowski =

German explorer, soldier, zoologist and mining engineer (1822–1878)

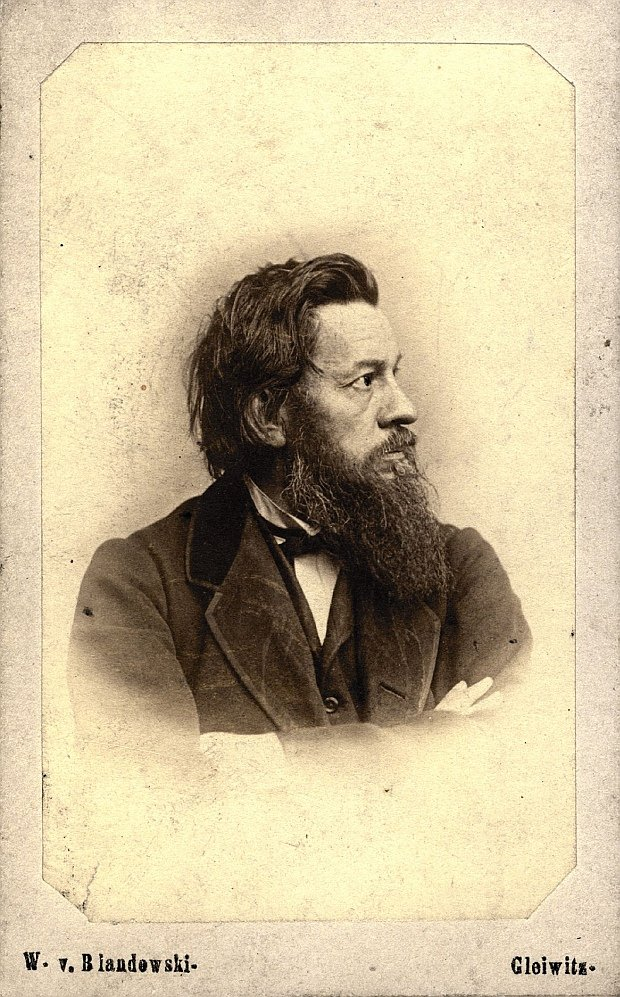
Photo of Blandowski

Johann Wilhelm Theodor Ludwig von Blandowski, known as William Blandowski (21 January 1822 – 18 December 1878), was a German explorer, soldier, zoologist and mining engineer of Polish descent, famous for his exploration of the Murray and Darling Rivers in Australia.

== Early life ==
Blandowski was born in Gleiwitz, Upper Silesia, Kingdom of Prussia (now Gliwice, Poland) on 21 January 1822. The youngest of thirteen children his parents, Johann Felix von Blandowski and Leopoldine Gottliebe von Woyrsch were Protestants, and members of the minor Polish aristocracy, using the Wieniawa coat-of-arms. He was educated at the Gymnasium in Lauban but left without gaining his Abitur certificate. He went on to study at the Tarnowitz Mining School and the University of Berlin. Blandowski's education was impacted by the death of his father, financial hardships, and controversies which resulted in quiet expulsions from various institutes.

After completing his education, he was employed as an assistant manager at the Koenigsgrube coal mine at Koenigshütte. A tempestuous character, he became swept up in the revolutions of 1848, and wrote a letter to his employer about his revolutionary sentiments. Resigning before he was dismissed, he then joined the Schleswig-Holstein Army in March 1848 and was promoted to the rank of lieutenant. After completing his army service he tried unsuccessfully to obtain another appointment in the Prussian Mining Service, but was turned down. These setbacks were one of the motivations for him to emigrate to Australia in 1849.

== Exploration ==
Blandowski was one of a number of influential German-speaking residents — such as Ludwig Becker, Hermann Beckler, Amalie Dietrich, Wilhelm Haacke, Diedrich Henne, Gerard Krefft, Johann Luehmann, Johann Menge, Carl Mücke (a.k.a. Muecke), Ludwig Preiss, Carl Ludwig Christian Rümker (a.k.a. Ruemker), Moritz Richard Schomburgk, Richard Wolfgang Semon, Karl Theodor Staiger, George Ulrich, Eugene von Guérard, Robert von Lendenfeld, Ferdinand von Mueller, Georg von Neumayer, and Carl Wilhelmi — who brought their "epistemic traditions" to Australia, and not only became "deeply entangled with the Australian colonial project", but also were "intricately involved in imagining, knowing and shaping colonial Australia" (Barrett, et al., 2018, p.2).

He arrived in Adelaide on 14 September 1849. There are reports his passage was paid by a patron, Karl Bernhardt Maximilian Wiebel (Wibel) (1808 – 1888) a founding member of the Zoological Museum in Hamburg. He began exploring the area around Adelaide, and his sketches from this period include geological scenes, fossils, animals, the Aboriginal people and their artefacts. Some are crudely executed on the spot, while others have been refined for further circulation. He sent back specimens and sketches to Hamburg.

Blandowski was ambitious, and made unsuccessful applications to the government, and influential colonists, to fund his explorations and surveys. He left South Australia for the goldfields of Victoria in 1851. He made a fortune on the goldfields, and he invented a double-action force pump to prevent mines being flooded. This success increased his profile and gained him the longed-for entrée into the upper echelons of society.

He was the first scientist appointed by Governor La Trobe to the new Victorian Museum on 1 April 1854, and had responsibility for early purchases of objects, specimens and books for the museum. He later became a member of the Philosophical Institute of Victoria, a forerunner of the Royal Society of Victoria. He was also a founder of the Geological Society of Victoria in 1852. In 1856, the Philosophical Institute, with £2000 in government backing, initiated a scientific expedition (the Blandowski Expedition) to the Murray River, led by Blandowski, with Gerard Krefft as second in command. The expedition travelled from Melbourne to Mildura Station between 6 December 1856 and 8 April 1857. A camp was located at Mondellimin (near modern Merbein) on the southern side of the Murray and, except for some side journeys made by Blandowski, the expedition stayed there for eight months. The Nyeri Nyeri people camped with the expedition and supplied most of the natural history specimens. Blandowski left the expedition early, returning to Melbourne via riverboat and steamer at the beginning of August. Krefft returned to Melbourne at the end of November 1857.

== Controversy ==
Throughout his life his ego and lack of interpersonal skills resulted in great disappointments, and public scandals. Blandowski decided to name some fish species documented on this expedition after members of the Philosophical Institute's council. However, a controversy ensued when two prominent council members felt insulted by his descriptions of the fish named for them:

- "Sample N. Slimy, slippery fish. Lives in the mud. Is of a violent bluish colour on the belly. The whole upper surface is of a dirty olivish-green colour, with numerous irregular dark patches."
- "Sample B. A fish easily recognized by its low forehead, big belly and sharp spine."

It is not known if Blandowski's insult was intentional, but it certainly led to substantial acrimony in the council. Blandowski refused to withdraw the descriptions or the paper in which they appeared, and was quickly censured by the council. The insulted parties attempted to have him expelled from the institute, but eventually withdrew themselves when they could not obtain the required two-thirds majority of votes.

Blandowski remained active in the Philosophical Institute for the next three years, participating in the Exploration Committee that organised the Burke and Wills expedition. He felt strongly that Victorians should be actively involved in exploring Australia. Blandowski returned to Europe in 1859 and complained of his treatment in Australia.

== Legacy ==
In his account of the expedition, Blandowski states that he brought back to Melbourne 28 boxes and parcels, of about 16,000 specimens, registered under 2000 different number and travelled about 1300 miles. During this expedition, Blandowski made efforts to document the everyday activities of Indigenous people, as well as dramatic conflicts and rituals, he also developed close relationships with the local Aboriginal people and was sympathetic to their situation.

In the early 21st century revived interest in Blandowski's explorations has generated discussion on the provenance of the sketches and illustrations attributed to him. His early sketches drawn while he was in South Australia, reveal he had little skill as an artist. During the Blandowski Expedition, Krefft was employed as an artist and made hundreds of drawings of the specimens gathered and the environment and people they encountered, these drawings are highly nuanced and capture in fine detail the images he is recording.

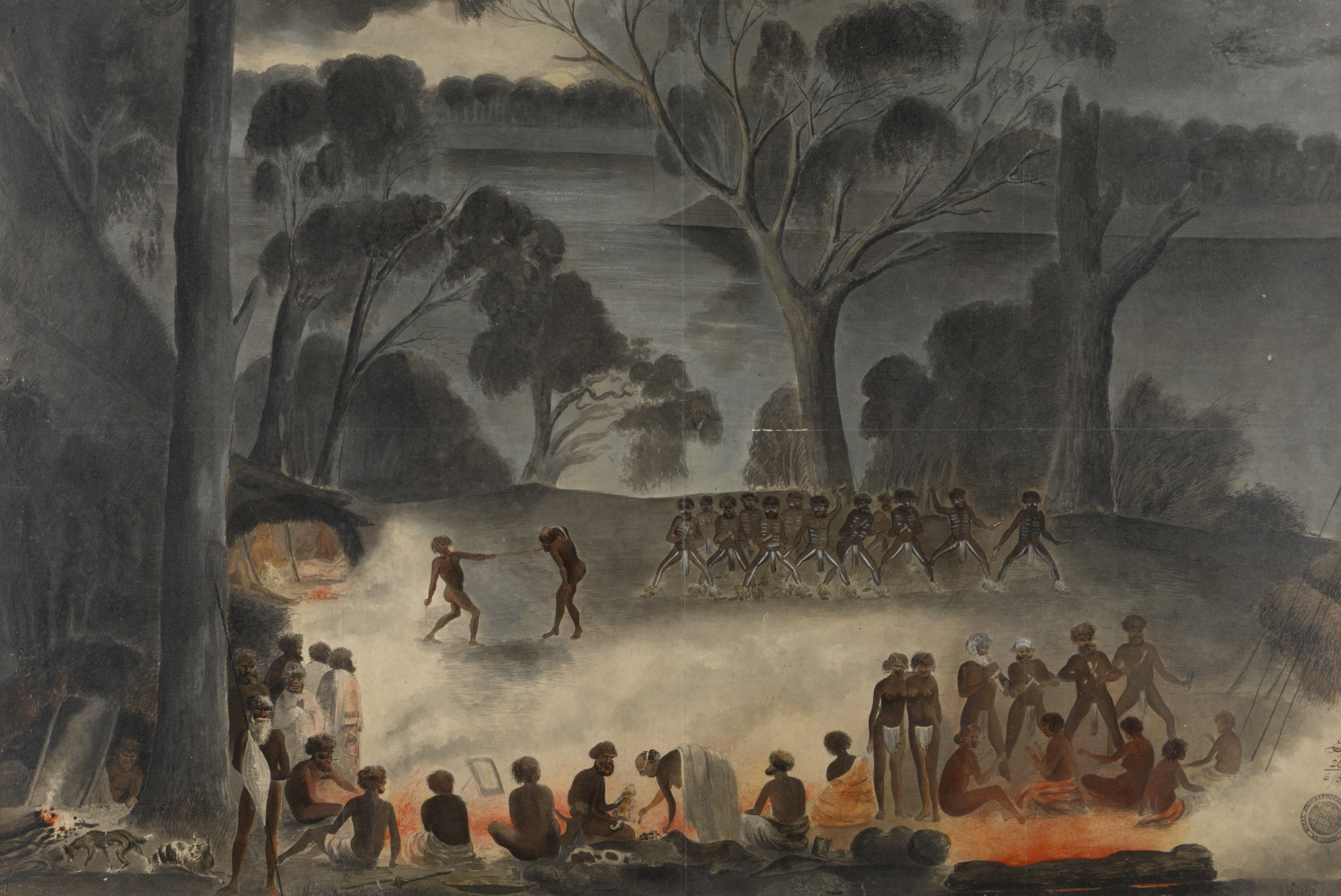
[Corroboree on the Murray River] / by Gerard Krefft, 1857

When he was back in Melbourne, Blandowski employed James Redaway to create engravings of some of the drawings, and in Germany Gustav Mützel also created illustrations and etchings. In 1862 he published Australia in Australien in 142 Photographischen Abbildungen, a pamphlet illustrated by Gustav Mützel about his experiences in Australia, with different sections dealing with Indigenous culture, economy, activities, initiation ceremonies, combat, sickness and death. In this work Blandowski does not attribute the drawings to Krefft, and this has created some of the confusion about attribution of the works. What is known is that in many cases the final works were either taken from photographs, turned into etchings and then photographed again, or were originally sketches that became etchings. In all cases the works were enhanced using the artistic conventions of the time.

He is commemorated in a genus of marine fish (Blandowskius), and of the Murray River perches (Blandowskiella).

== Death ==
Blandowski was committed to the Provincial Mental Asylum in Bunzlau (now Bolesławiec) in 1873. He died there, of an "obstruction of the bowels", on 18 December 1878.

== Published works ==
Blandowski, William (1822), Australien in 142 photographischen, Verlag, 1862. available online
