= Moritz Richard Schomburgk =

German botanist and curator

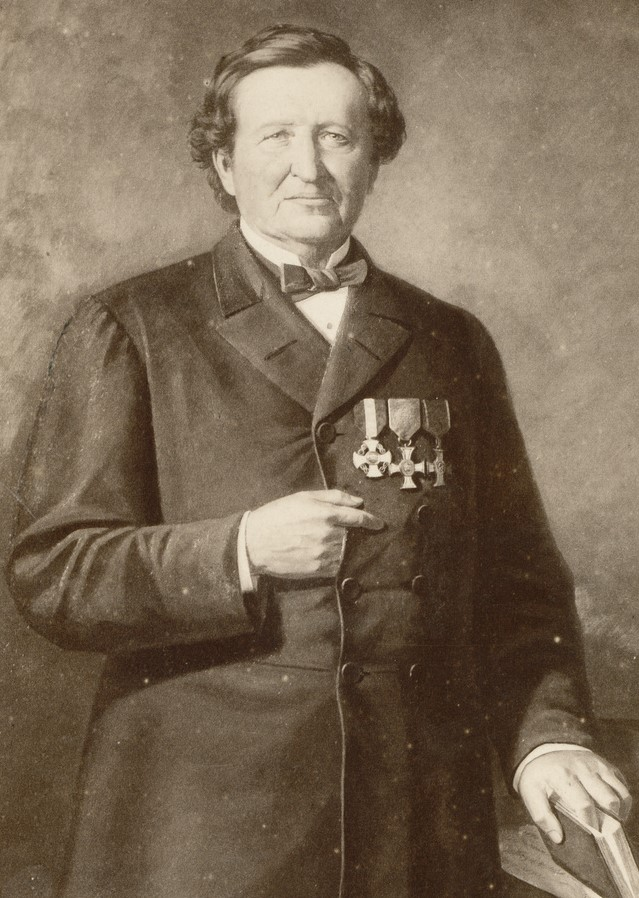

Moritz Richard Schomburgk (German: [ˈmoːʁɪts ˈʁɪçaʁt ˈʃɔmbʊʁk]; 5 October 1811 – 24 March 1891), generally known as Richard Schomburgk, was a German botanist and curator of the Adelaide Botanic Garden.

== Family ==
Schomburgk was born in Freyburg, Saxony, the son of Johann Friedrich Ludwig Schomburgk (a Lutheran minister in Thuringia), and his wife Christiane Juliane Wilhelmine (née Krippendorf).

He married Pauline Henriette Kneib (c. 1822 – 24 July 1879) at sea aboard Princess Louise. Among their children were:

- Otto Heinrich Schomburgk (30 September 1857 – 1 September 1938), born shortly after the death of his uncle Otto Alfred Schomburgk. He held several important posts such as Chief Probation Officer with the South Australian public service. He married Ada Louise Downer, daughter of Henry Downer. They had one son, Richard, and two daughters, Pauline Louise (Mrs Curwen) and Alice Marie (Mrs Howard).
- Eldest daughter Linna Maria 1849 Marie Caroline? Schomburgk ( died 17 April 1913) married widower Rev James Sunter in Sydney on 28 May 1894.
- Second daughter Clara Louise Schomburgk (1855– ) married Alexander Philip on 3 November 1880.
- Youngest daughter Hermine Rosalie Schomburgk (1861– ) married John Herbert Evans on 8 April 1891.

His older brother, Sir Robert Hermann Schomburgk (5 June 1804 – 11 March 1865), carried out geographical, ethnological and botanical studies in South America and the West Indies (in which Schomburgk participated) and also fulfilled diplomatic missions for Great Britain in the Dominican Republic and Thailand.

Another brother, Otto Alfred Carl Schomburgk (28 August 1810 – 16 August 1857), (see below) and his wife Maria Charlotte Schomburgk (née Von Selchow), arrived in South Australia with Moritz Richard Schomburgk aboard the Princess Louise in August 1849. They had a son Robert Carl (1856 – 24 February 1909).

His youngest brother, Julius Ludwig Schomburgk, (c. 1818 – 9 March 1893), was chief designer for Adelaide silversmith J. M. Wendt.

A sister, Caroline Schomburgk ( – 15 November 1874), was the second wife of Rev. Dr Carl Wilhelm Ludwig Muecke (16 July 1815 – 4 January 1898) of Tanunda, also a passenger on the Princess Louise.

== Education ==
Schomburgk studied botany at Berlin and in the Royal Gardens at Potsdam.

== Career ==
In 1844 he went on the Prussian-British expedition to British Guiana and Brazil, led by his brother Robert. He acted as their historian and botanist, collecting for the University of Berlin museum, and after their return spent three years preparing the three-volume record of the expedition, which was presented to Frederick William IV, King of Prussia.

=== Australia ===
After the revolutions of 1848, Richard and his brother Otto, (Note: Otto Alfred Carl Schomburgk was involved with Carl Muecke and Gustav Dröge as founders of the newspaper Suedaustralische Zeitung in 1848. He was a founder of the German Immigration Society that reopened the German Labour Office, to expedite immigration of suitable German citizens. He was appointed a Justice of the Peace in 1851 and as Rev. Dr Schomburgk appointed an officiating minister the same year. He was appointed to the Central Board of Education in 1852 and served as judge at the Gawler Races in 1853. He was a leader in the push to make two councils from the Mudla Wirra and Port Gawler Council, and creation of a network of meteorological observers, having himself taken regular observations since 1850. He died at home in Buchsfelde on 16 August 1857, aged 48, after a long illness.) and Otto's wife Maria Charlotte Schomburgk (née Von Selchow) emigrated to South Australia aboard the Princess Louise, arriving in August 1849. While at sea he married Pauline Henriette Schomburgk Kneib). Other emigrants by the Princess Louise include Carl Linger and Carl Wilhelm Ludwig Muecke.

He settled in Gawler, South Australia; and, through this, he was one of a number of influential German-speaking residents — such as Ludwig Becker, Hermann Beckler, William Blandowski, Amalie Dietrich, Wilhelm Haacke, Diedrich Henne, Gerard Krefft, Johann Luehmann, Johann Menge, Carl Mücke (a.k.a. Muecke), Ludwig Preiss, Carl Ludwig Christian Rümker (a.k.a. Ruemker), Richard Wolfgang Semon, Karl Theodor Staiger, George Ulrich, Eugene von Guérard, Robert von Lendenfeld, Ferdinand von Mueller, Georg von Neumayer, and Carl Wilhelmi — who brought their "epistemic traditions" to Australia, and not only became "deeply entangled with the Australian colonial project", but also were "intricately involved in imagining, knowing and shaping colonial Australia" (Barrett, et al., 2018, p.2). (Note: In relation to "Australasia", another German-speaking explorer and geologist, Julius von Haast (1822-1887), was appointed as the inaugural Curator/Director of the Canterbury Museum, in Christchurch, New Zealand in 1867.)

In 1865, he became Director of the Adelaide Botanic Garden, a position he kept until his death and was succeeded by Maurice William Holtze.

Schomburgk was also involved in acclimatisation experiments at the Adelaide Botanic Garden, overseeing trials of introduced species considered potentially useful to the colony. A contemporary newspaper report describes the introduction of gourami fish from Mauritius, which were transported with difficulty by sea and presented to the garden for experimental cultivation as a possible food resource.

== Works ==
He wrote Versuch einer Zusammenstellung der Flora und Fauna von Britisch-Guiana (1848).

== Death ==
Schomburgk died in Adelaide, South Australia.

== Taxa named in his honor ==
- Moritz Richard Schomburgk is commemorated in the scientific name of a species of Australian lizard, Ctenotus schomburgkii.
- the yellowfin whiting Sillago schomburgkii Peters, 1864

== See also ==
- Hundred of Schomburgk
- John Richard Schomburgk Evans, Australian architect in practice with F. Kenneth Milne 1920–1930
