= Richard Semon =

German zoologist, explorer, evolutionary biologist and memory researcher

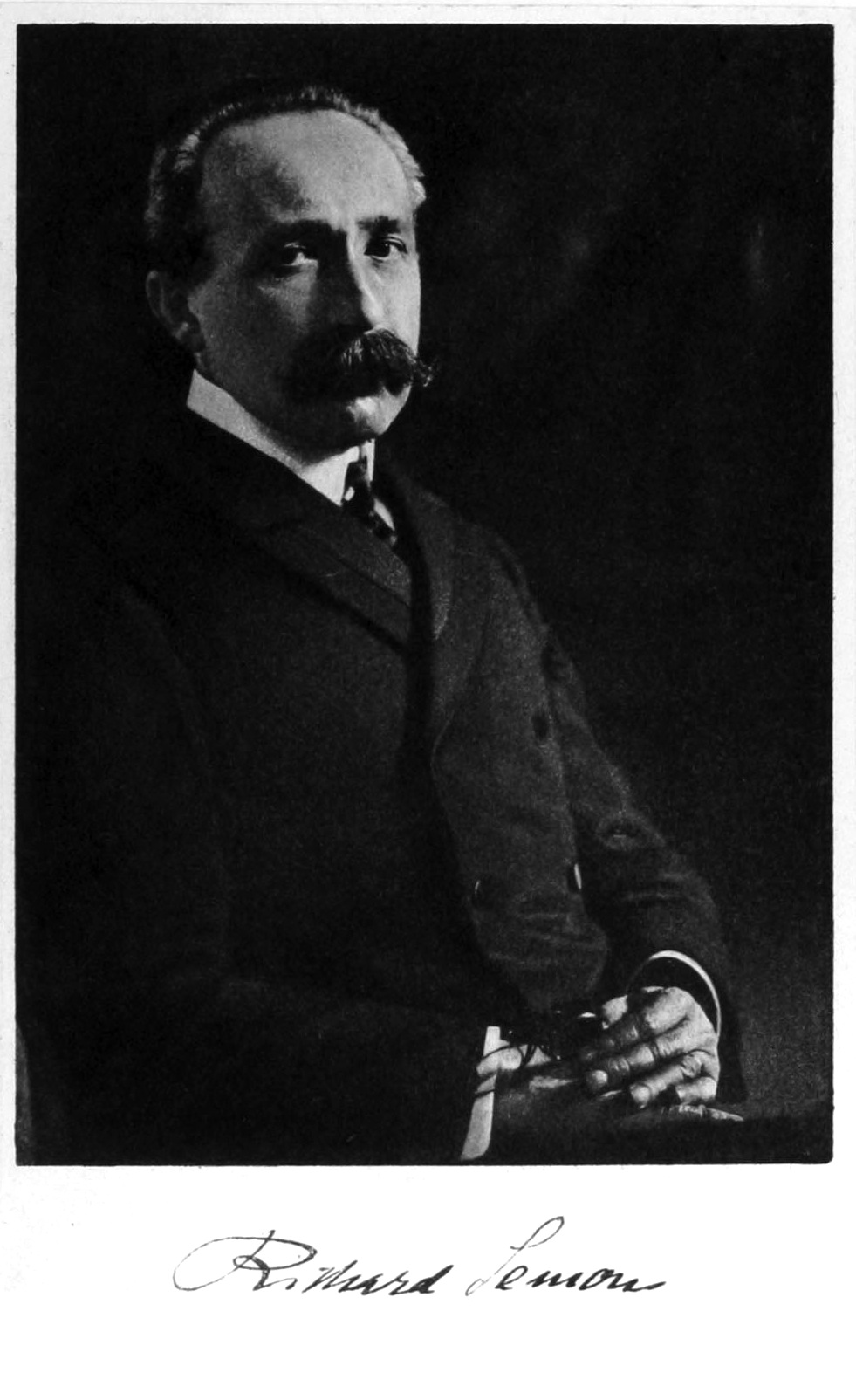
Richard Semon

Richard Wolfgang Semon (22 August 1859, in Berlin – 27 December 1918, in Munich) was a German zoologist, explorer, evolutionary biologist and memory researcher who believed in the inheritance of acquired characteristics and applied this to social evolution. He is known for coining the terms engram and ecphory. He wrote about these ideas in his book Die Mneme (1904). He propounded the idea that organisms acquired bodily memory based on environment and experience that was imprinted in tissues and could be transmitted across generations, a form of epigenetics.

== Early life ==
Semon was born in Berlin, the son of stockbroker Simon and Henrietta Aschenheim, both from wealthy Jewish families. A brother, Felix, became a laryngologist in England, and received knighthood in 1897. Semon became interested in evolution early after reading Darwin while still at Gymnasium. He received a doctorate from the University of Jena (1883) in zoology under Otto Bütschli and wrote a dissertation on the nervous system of Holothuria ("Das Nervensystem der Holothurien"). He also studied under Ernst Haeckel (1834–1919) and then studied medicine at Heidelberg receiving a medical degree in 1886. He converted to Christianity in 1885. He joined an expedition to Africa with Robert Flegel as a physician but had to leave from Lagos after contracting malaria. He never practiced but his interests in evolutionary biology made him return to work with Haeckel. He also spent some time at the zoological research station in Naples (1885–1886) with Anton Dohrn. He habilitated in 1887 with a dissertation “Die indifferente Anlage der Keimdrüsen beim Hühnchen und ihre Differenzierung zum Hoden” (“The Undifferentiated Rudiments of the Genital Glands of the Chick and Their Differentiation Into Testicles”). He received an appointment as an extraordinary associate professor at the University of Jena in 1891. He then went on an expedition to Australia.

== Australia (1891-93) ==
Before taking up his appointment at the University of Jena, he spent three years travelling around Australia; and the Indonesian Archipelago and, as a consequence, he was one of a number of influential German-speaking residents — such as Ludwig Becker, Hermann Beckler, William Blandowski, Amalie Dietrich, Wilhelm Haacke, Diedrich Henne, Gerard Krefft, Johann Luehmann, Johann Menge, Carl Mücke (a.k.a. Muecke), Ludwig Preiss, Carl Ludwig Christian Rümker (a.k.a. Ruemker), Moritz Richard Schomburgk, Karl Theodor Staiger, George Ulrich, Eugene von Guérard, Robert von Lendenfeld, Ferdinand von Mueller, Georg von Neumayer, and Carl Wilhelmi — who brought their "epistemic traditions" to Australia, and not only became "deeply entangled with the Australian colonial project", but also were "intricately involved in imagining, knowing and shaping colonial Australia" (Barrett, et al., 2018, p. 2). He collected specimens intensively and was particularly interested in lungfishes. He returned with stops at Singapore and Bombay. The sponsor of the expedition Paul von Ritter (1825–1915) published the reports of his work.

== Jena and Munich ==
Semon was working on the reports of the Australasian expedition when he met Maria Krehl (1863–1918), the wife of Jena pathologist Ludolf Krehl (1861–1937) and daughter of the publisher Carl Geibel (1806–1884). Max Fürbringer (1846–1920) had written to Haeckel about the impending problem and how it would cause him to sever ties with the University of Jena. Semon left Jena with Maria, the mother of three children, causing a scandal. The couple were initially expected to flee to Australia but they settled in Munich where they married in 1899. Ludolf Krehl left Jena in 1897 and took care of the children. Maria Semon began to translate, with the assistance of her husband, the works of Darwin, Auguste Forel and Lloyd Morgan.

== Thesis on memory ==
Semon proposed psycho-physiological parallelism according to which every psychological state corresponds to alterations in the nerves. His ideas of the mneme (based on the Greek goddess, Mneme, the muse of memory) were developed early in the 20th century. The mneme represented the memory of an external-to-internal experience. The resulting "mnemic trace" (or "engram") would be revived when an element resembling a component of the original complex of stimuli was encountered. Semon's mnemic principle was based upon how stimuli produce a "permanent record,... written or engraved on the irritable substance", i.e. upon cellular material energetically predisposed to such inscription. According to historian Petteri Pietikainen:

Semon argued not only that information is encoded into memory and that there are 'memory traces' (engrams) or after-effects of stimulation that conserve the changes in the nervous system, he also contended that these changes in the brain (that is, engrams) are inherited. Semon's mneme-theory fell into disrepute largely because in a Lamarckian fashion it proposed that memory units are passed from one generation to another.

Semon was a proponent of the theory of organic memory, which was popular amongst biologists and psychologists from 1870 to 1918. The theory later lost scientific legitimacy as it yielded no reliable data and advances in genetics made the theory untenable. He considered the circadian rhythms of plants as examples of organic memory. Semon found evidence in the way that different parts of the body relate to each other involuntarily, such as "reflex spasms, co-movements, sensory radiations," to infer distribution of "engraphic influence." He also took inventive recourse to phonography, the "mneme machine," to explain the uneven distribution and revival of engrams. He was very interested in the findings of William L. Tower who found in 1906 that the Colorado beetle (Leptinotarsa decemlineata) varied in patterning and colour according to the exposure of the larvae to varying temperature and humidity regimes. Tower's studies were later doubted and he left under a cloud from the University of Chicago in 1917.

Semon's book, Die Mneme, influenced the Mnemosyne project of the idiosyncratic art historian Aby Warburg. Semon's Mneme should not be confused with meme, a separate concept coined by Richard Dawkins. David Hull, a philosopher of biology, argued that meme and mneme are parallel concepts of which Dawkins inadvertently provided the first development of since Semon. Nevertheless, the two concepts are not often discussed together. Semon's book was translated posthumously into English in 1921 and the first English biography of Semon was written by Schacter in 1978.

== Suicide ==
In 1918 in Munich, shortly after the end of World War I, Semon shot himself in his wife's room after wrapping himself in a German Imperial flag allegedly because he was depressed by Germany's defeat. His wife had passed away a few months earlier from cancer. He wrote a farewell letter to Auguste Forel. In it he wrote that his memory was failing and that his mother had suffered from senile dementia. He considered his symptoms as a warning and expressed his gratitude to Forel for his support and intellectual stimulation. He left an unfinished manuscript for Forel. The complete last letter was published by Forel in 1919 in the Journal für Psychologie und Neurologie.

== Legacy ==
Semon is commemorated in the scientific name of a species of green-blooded skink (Prasinohaema semoni), and an Acantocephalan (Australiformis semoni).

== Bibliography ==
- Anon (1895), "The Ceratodus: a German Scientist's Work", The Queenslander, (Saturday, 30 March 1895), p.597: in part, refers to Semon (1894).
- Barrett, L., Eckstein, L., Hurley, A.W. & Schwarz A. (2018), "Remembering German-Australian Colonial Entanglement: An Introduction", Postcolonial Studies, Vol.21, No.1, (January 2018), pp. 1–5. doi:10.1080/13688790.2018.1443671
- Beolens, B., Watkins, M. & Grayson, M. (2011), "Semon", p. 240, in B. Beolens, M. Watkins, & M. Grayson (eds.), The Eponym Dictionary of Reptiles. Baltimore, MD: Johns Hopkins University Press. ISBN 978-1-4214-0135-5.
- Dawkins, R. (1976). The Selfish Gene. Oxford University Press.
- Schacter, Daniel (2001). Forgotten Ideas, Neglected Pioneers: Richard Semon and the Story of Memory. Philadelphia: Psychology Press. ISBN 1-84169-052-X.
- Goeschel, Christian (2009). Suicide in Nazi Germany. Oxford University Press. ISBN 978-0-19-953256-8.
- Landsberg, A. (2004), Prosthetic Memory: The Transformation of American Remembrance in the Age of Mass Culture, New York, NY: Columbia University Press. ISBN 978-0-231-12927-5
- Ludwig, Lars (2013). Extended Artificial Memory. Toward an integral cognitive theory of memory and technology. University of Kaiserslautern. (includes a summary, an actualization and extension of the Semonian theory of memory)
- Pietikainen, P. (2007), Alchemists of Human Nature: Psychological Utopianism in Gross, Jung, Reich and Fromm, London: Routledge. ISBN 978-1-85196-923-4
- Rampley, Matthew (2000), The Remembrance of Things Past: On Aby M. Warburg and Walter Benjamin, Wiesbaden: Harrasowitz Verlag. ISBN 3-447-04299-0
- Richards, G. (2002), Putting Psychology in Its Place: A Critical Historical Overview, London: Routledge. ISBN 1-84169-233-6
- Semon, R. (1894), Zoologische Forschungsreisen in Australien und dem Malayischen Archipel, ausgeführt in den Jahren 1891-1893 von Prof. Dr. R. Semon, Erster Band: Ceratodus, Jena: Gustav Fischer.
- Semon, R. (1899), In the Australian Bush and on the Coast of the Coral Sea: Being the Experiences and Observations of a Naturalist in Australia, New Guinea and the Moluccas, London: Macmillan & Co.
- Semon, R. (1921), The Mneme, London: George Allen & Unwin.
- Semon, R. (1922), Die mnemischen Empfindungen in ihren Beziehungen zu den Originalempfindungen, Leipzig: Wilhelm Engelmann: (in German)
- Semon, R. (Duffy, B. trans.) (1923), Mnemic Psychology, London: George Allen & Unwin.
- von Linstow, O.F.B. (1898), "Nemathelminthen von Herrn Richard Semon in Australien gesammelt", Denkschriften der Medizinisch-Naturwissenschaftlichen Gesellschaft zu Jena, 8: 467–472: (in German)
