= Johann Menge =

Australian geologist

Johannes Menge (4 January 1788 – 1852), is regarded as South Australia's first geologist, though he had no formal qualifications. An early explorer of the new colony, he was influential in the settlement of the Barossa Valley.

He has been called the "father of South Australian mineralogy". On the passenger list of the ship that brought him out he was called "Johannes Joseph Menge", but in his letters to newspapers he variously called himself "John" and "Joseph". To fellow-colonists he was "Professor Menge".

== History ==
Born in the town of Steinau, Holy Roman Empire, Germany, Menge had little formal education, but was a keen learner and quickly gained a broad knowledge of languages, philosophy, medicine, religion, and geology. His particular interest in geology developed after his early employment by Privy Councillor Karl Cäsar von Leonhard, who collected and sold mineral specimens. Menge later travelled widely through Europe and beyond, and was awarded an honorary degree of Professor of Mineralogy from the University of Lübeck in 1821.

== England ==
After the death of his wife in 1830 he moved to England, where he taught languages, notably Hebrew.

== Australia ==
He became friends with George Fife Angas, who encouraged him to travel to the new colony of South Australia for employment with the South Australia Company. Menge sailed to South Australia aboard Coromandel. On 12 January 1837 the ship arrived at Kangaroo Island, where Menge was hired as the colony's Mine and Quarry Agent and Geologist. However, his eccentric ways led to his dismissal from the company on 30 June 1838.

Menge then moved to the South Australian mainland, travelling widely, exploring alone as far north as Mount Remarkable and searching for minerals, while engaging in many other interests. He was the first to discover copper in the Adelaide Hills. He kept in regular contact with George Fife Angas and sent him letters and reports; his activities thus encouraging the spread of settlement, and mineral exploration by others. This ultimately led to a mining boom that saved the fledgling colony. He wrote papers on several topics, particularly mineralogy, and in 1840 wrote a book entitled Mineral Kingdom of South Australia.

He was one of a number of influential German-speaking residents — such as Ludwig Becker, Hermann Beckler, William Blandowski, Amalie Dietrich, Wilhelm Haacke, Diedrich Henne, Gerard Krefft, Johann Luehmann, Carl Mücke (a.k.a. Muecke), Ludwig Preiss, Carl Ludwig Christian Rümker (a.k.a. Ruemker), Moritz Richard Schomburgk, Richard Wolfgang Semon, Karl Theodor Staiger, George Ulrich, Eugene von Guérard, Robert von Lendenfeld, Ferdinand von Mueller, Georg von Neumayer, and Carl Wilhelmi — who brought their "epistemic traditions" to Australia, and not only became "deeply entangled with the Australian colonial project", but also were "intricately involved in imagining, knowing and shaping colonial Australia" (Barrett, et al., 2018, p. 2).

Menge was particularly fond of the Barossa Valley (which he called "New Silesia"), and he lived there for some time in a cave on the banks of Jacob's Creek at its junction with the North Para River. He diverted the flow of Jacob's Creek and created "Menges' Island" where he grew vegetables. He was particularly struck with the possibilities for viticulture. Menge wrote to Angas detailing the Barossa as "the cream, the whole cream and nothing but the cream". When the first German Lutheran immigrants arrived in the state, Menge assisted in their resettlement from their initial residence in the Adelaide Hills to the Barossa Valley. It is claimed that in 1849 Menge made the first discovery of opal in Australia.

Despite Menge being attributed with many early geological discoveries in South Australia, it was Thomas Burr who most keenly and scientifically observed the colony's geology, his Remarks on the Geology and Mineralogy of South Australia being published at Adelaide in 1846, this being the colony's first official government geological report and the first geological book to be published in Australia.

== Death ==
In 1852 Menge walked overland to the Victorian gold diggings, where in the winter of that year he died (though news did not reach the newspapers until October) and was buried at Forest Creek (now Chewton, part of Castlemaine) near Bendigo.

== Biography ==
A biography of Menge was written by W. A. Cawthorne (1825–1897), an early Adelaide schoolmaster.

== Named by Menge ==
- Hereinien Range, (between Stockwell and Truro) and its highest peak, Broken, for a fancied resemblance to similarly named German features (possibly Brocken).
- Belvidere Range
- Kaiserstuhl
