= Frederick Wurm =

Louis Friedrich Wurm (1832 – 1 December 1910), generally known as Fred or Frederick, was an early colonist of South Australia.

== History ==
Wurm was born at Dortmund (then in Prussia), in 1832. He emigrated to South Australia in 1849. The following year he joined the Mounted Police, and was for some years stationed at Angaston. In 1856 he joined his brother Friedrich Carl Wilhelm Heinrich "Henry" Wurm in business in Grenfell Street, but when Henry left for New Zealand in 1860 Frederick went into business as a grain and produce merchant in Twin Street. In 1873 he entered into partnership with C. N. Collins with a general store in Stansbury, with branches at Curramulka and Minlaton.

== Other interests ==
- He turned his property in Unley Park into a very productive garden, and exhibited dried fruits, olive oil and silk in London, Paris, and Philadelphia, winning various medals and diplomas. He was awarded a £250 bonus as the first to produce 100 pounds (45 kg) of silk produced in South Australia in one year.
- He was a fine tenor, and a member of the Adelaide Liedertafel and conductor of the Unley Glee Club.
- For nine years he was organist at St. Augustine's Church, Unley
- He retired in 1881, and had an extensive garden in a very picturesque position alongside cliffs about a mile (1.6 km) from Stansbury, where he planted about 80 acres (32 ha) of olives and manufactured large quantities of high class olive oil.

== Family ==
Wurm married Julia Crush ( –1912) in 1859. Their family included:

- Elizabeth Julia Wurm (1860–1948) married Richard Curtis Yeo ( –1903) in 1881, lived in Unley
- Frederick Henry Wurm (1865–1938) of Port Pirie acted as Consul for Norway, was awarded the title of Chevalier of the Order of St. Olav in recognition of his services.
- Gertrude Mary Wurm (1867–1939) married Henry Mayelston Mudie (28 March 1857 – 20 February 1933) in 1903, lived in Hawthorn
- Gustav Adolph Wurm (1869–1943) of Stansbury
- Walter Charles Wurm, from 1916 known as Walter Charles Weston, (1872– ) formerly of Port Pirie, later of the Port Adelaide Customs Department
- Alfred Ernest Wurm, from 1917 known as Alfred Ernest Weston, (1877–1939) storekeeper, of Eastern Well
- Mabel Josephine Wurm (1883–1918) of Stansbury, buried at Mitcham Anglican Cemetery
