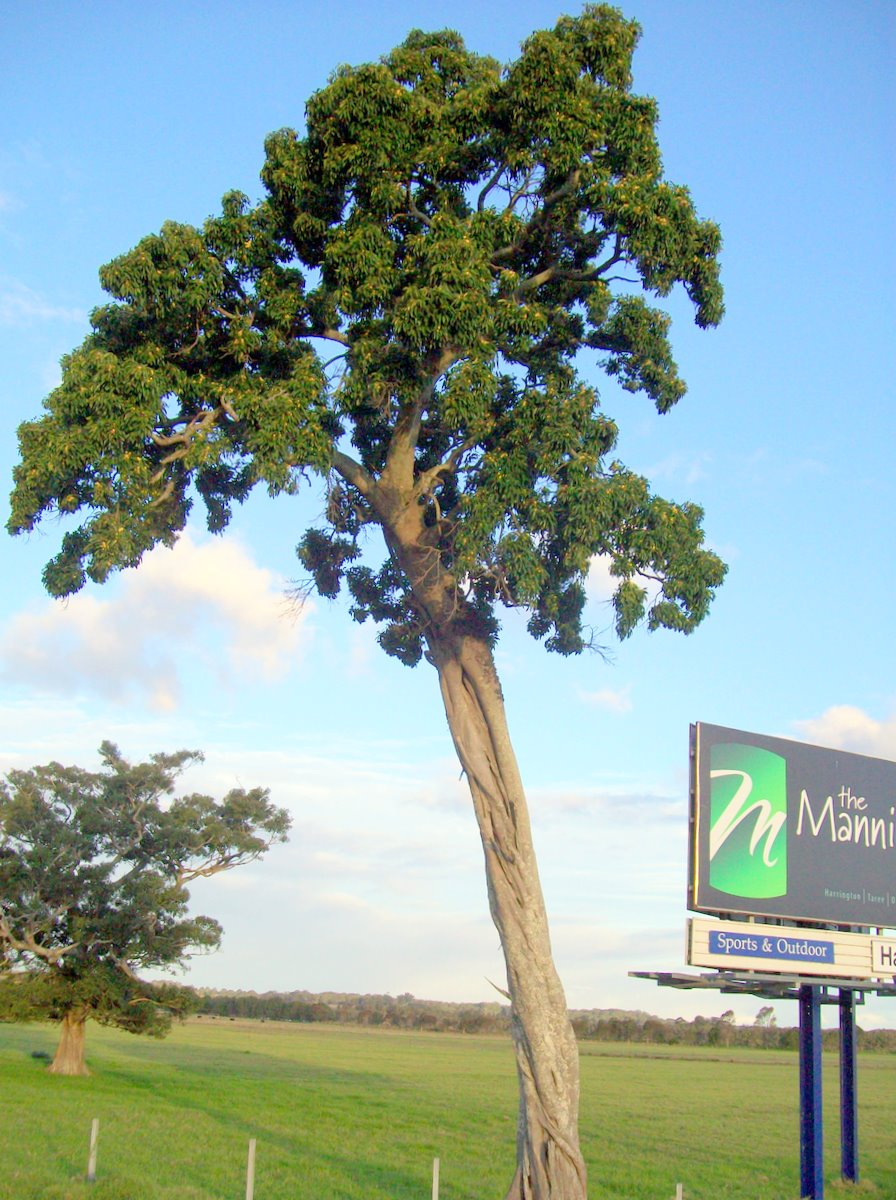
- Deciduous fig by the Pacific Highway, near the Manning River, Australia

Conservation status
- Least Concern (IUCN 3.1)

Scientific classification
- Kingdom: Plantae
- Clade: Tracheophytes
- Clade: Angiosperms
- Clade: Eudicots
- Clade: Rosids
- Order: Rosales
- Family: Moraceae
- Genus: Ficus
- Species: F. henneana

Binomial name
- Ficus henneana Miq.

Synonyms
- Ficus gracilipes F.M.Bailey; Ficus parkinsonii Hiern; Ficus pritzelii Warb.; Ficus superba var henneana (Miq.) Corner

= Ficus henneana =

Deciduous fig

Species of fig

Ficus henneana is a strangler fig only occurring in Australia. The cedar fig or deciduous fig grows in Australia from Milton, New South Wales to northern Queensland and the Northern Territory. The habitat is riverine, littoral or the drier forms of rainforest. The fruit is considered edible for humans, but it is not particularly palatable. It was previously considered a variety of Ficus superba which occurs in China, Japan and parts of South East Asia.

== Collection and naming ==
This Australian variety was named after Diedrich Henne, who collected this plant at Booby Island in the Torres Strait in 1861. In 1868 it was named Ficus henneana. Joseph Banks also collected this plant from the Booby Island on August 23, 1770. That specimen may have been from the same tree as Henne's specimen, (as the island is so small). Banks' plant was named in 1901 after the Endeavor's artist Sydney Parkinson, (Ficus parkinsonii). However, this name fell out of favour as Ficus henneana was already named in 1868. The specific epithet superba is from Latin referring to "outstanding" or "superb". The plant has had other scientific names, such as Ficus gracilipes, Ficus pritzelii and Urostigma superbum. The tree is semi deciduous, seldom losing all leaves. It may be seen almost bare of leaves in the month of October. In 2013, the species was reassigned to the original name of Ficus henneana, as described by Friedrich Miquel.

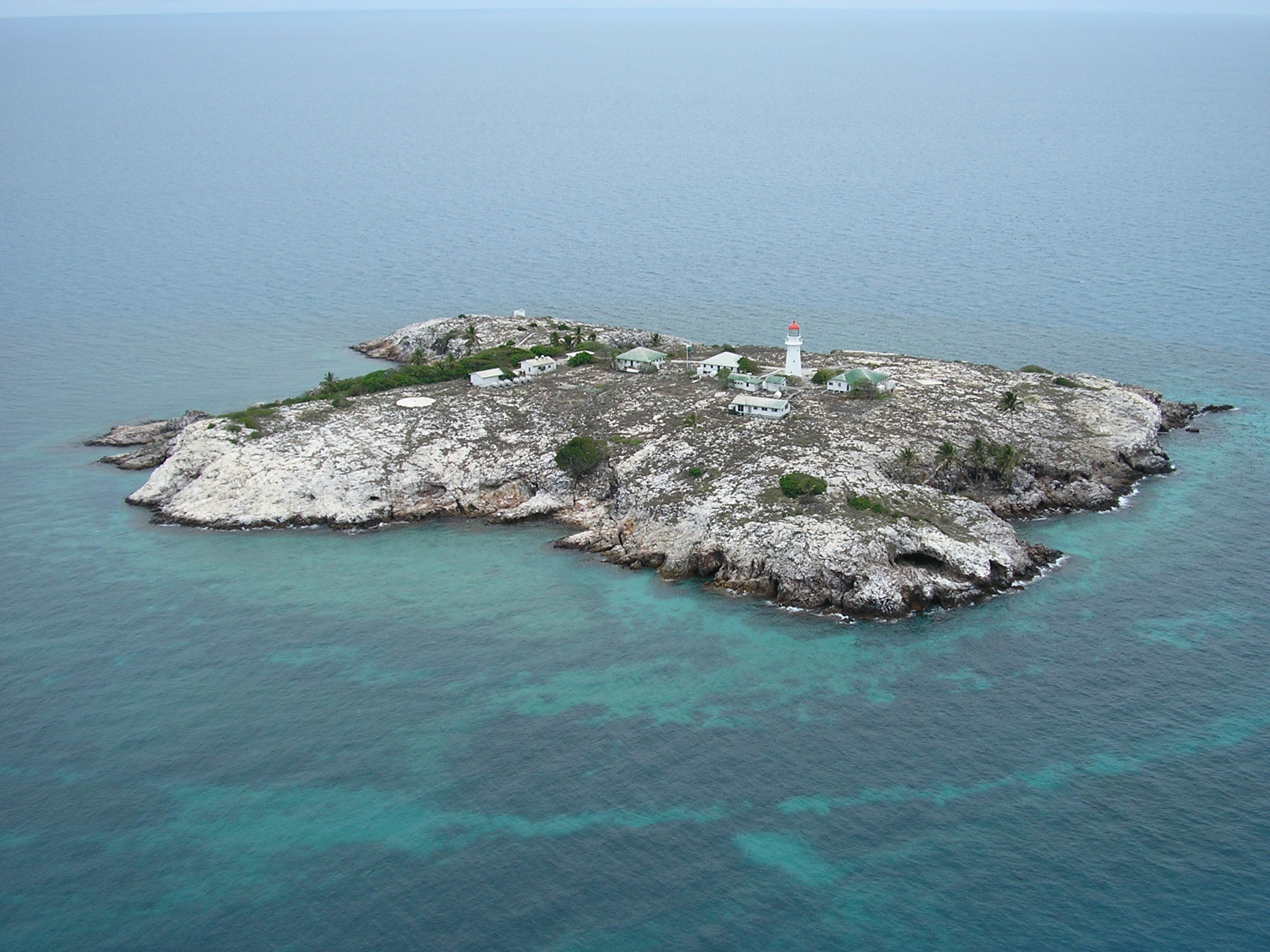
Booby Island, where Joseph Banks and Diedrich Henne collected samples of the deciduous fig

== Description ==
Ficus henneana can grow to 35 metres (115 ft) in height in the best sites, or a smaller spreading tree on exposed rocky slopes. Like other strangler figs it is a hemi-epiphyte.

The bark is grey or reddish brown. Rough with scales, cracks and vertical bumps. The base of the tree is buttressed, but not as prominently as in the Moreton Bay fig. White sap appears when a branch is cut.

Leaves are alternate, simple and entire, 8 to 12 centimetres (3.1 to 4.7 in) long and 2 to 5 centimetres (0.79 to 1.97 in) wide. Oval or elliptical in shape. Mostly with a short blunt tip. Rounded at the base or heart shaped. This tree can be identified in New South Wales by the long leaf stem 2 to 5 cm (0.79 to 1.97 in) long. The leaf midrib is sunken on the upper surface and raised below.

== Reproduction ==
Flowers form within a translucent receptacle, a syconium. Flowers pollinated by fig wasps within the fig. The mature fig changes to a purplish colour with pink dots, globular in shape, 25 millimetres (0.98 in) in diameter. Figs ripe from January to July, but sometimes appearing mature in different times of the year.

The figs are eaten by a large variety of birds including the Australasian figbird, Coxen's fig parrot, green catbird, Lewin's honeyeater, regent bowerbird, rose crowned fruit dove, topknot pigeon, wompoo fruit dove and yellow-eyed cuckoo-shrike. Regeneration is easy from fresh seed and cuttings. The marcotting technique of propagation is suited to Ficus henneana.

== Uses ==
Suited to parks and large gardens as an ornamental tree

== Gallery ==
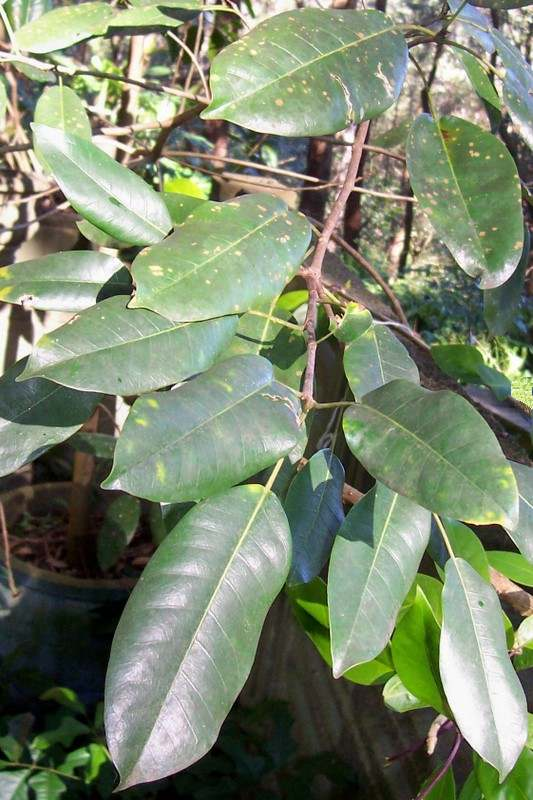
Deciduous fig leaves, from Maleny, Australia

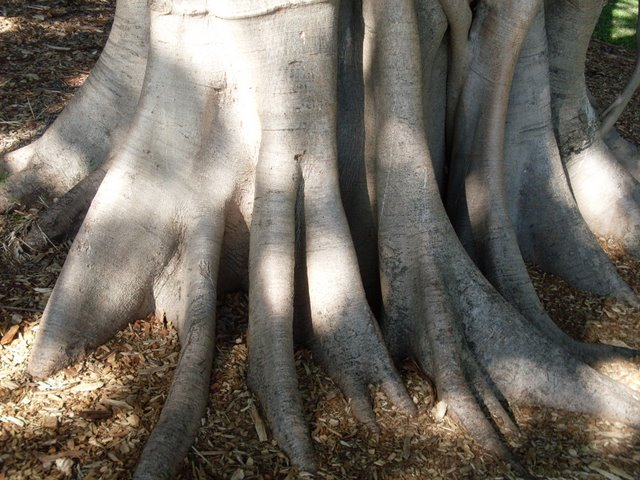
Royal Botanic Gardens, Sydney

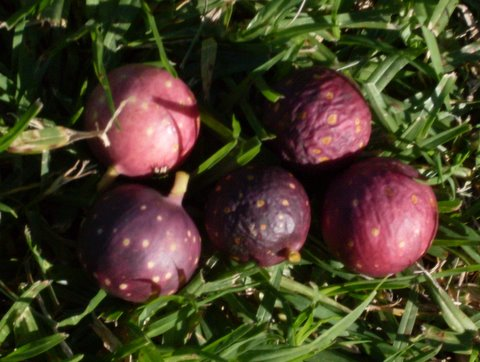
Fallen figs - Royal Botanic Gardens, Sydney

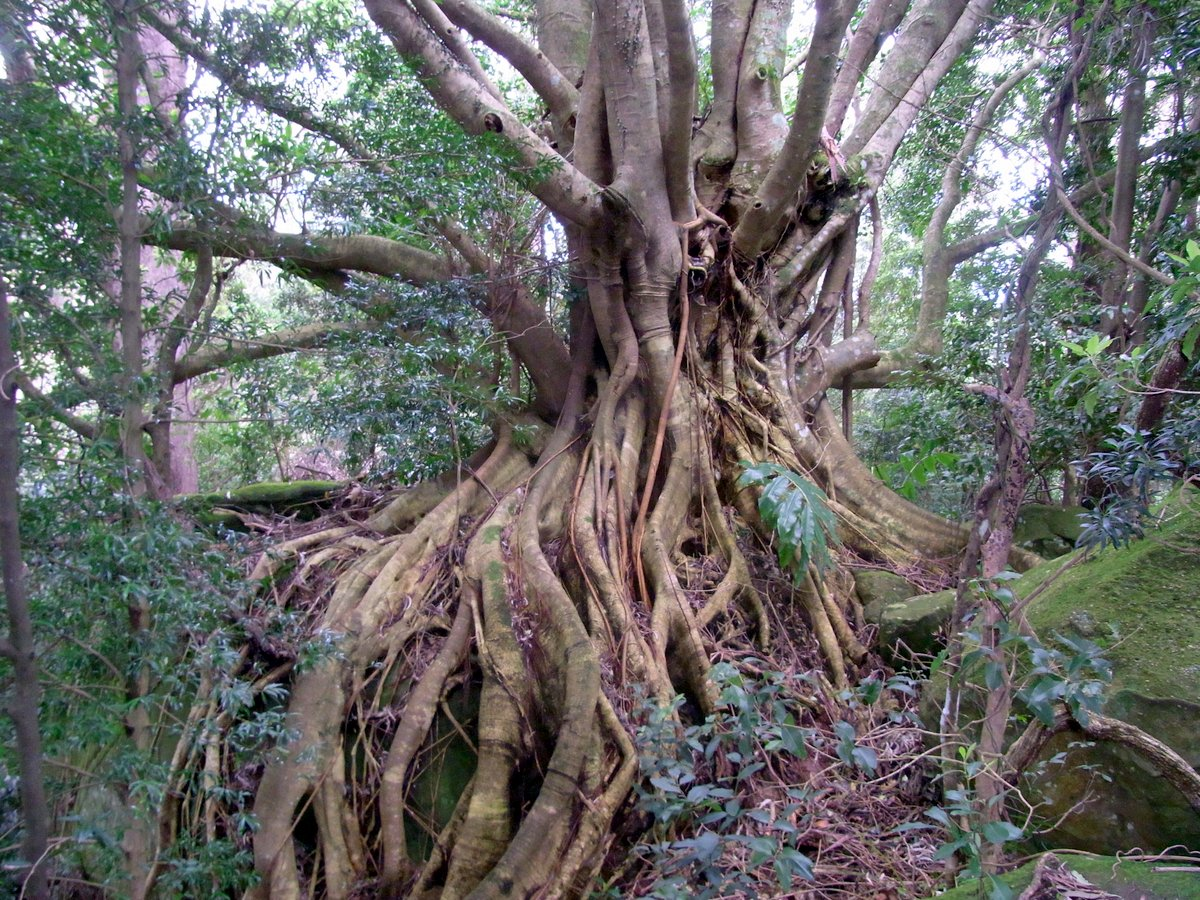
mature tree at Foxground
