= George Henry Frederick Ulrich =

New Zealand mineralogist and academic (1830–1900)

George H. F. Ulrich FGS
- Born: Georg Heinrich Friedrich Ulrich; 7 July 1830; Zellerfeld, Upper Harz, Germany
- Died: 26 May 1900 (aged 69); Port Chalmers, New Zealand
- Occupations: Mineralogist, university professor, director of School of Mines
- Spouse: Catherine Sarah Spence
- Children: Frank Ferdinand Aplin Ulrich (surgeon), George Henry Roemer Ulrich (lawyer)

George Henry Frederick Ulrich FGS (born as Georg Heinrich Friedrich Ulrich) (7 July 1830 – 26 May 1900) was a notable New Zealand mineralogist, university professor and director of the school of mines.

== Early life ==
He was born in Zellerfeld, Germany in 1830.

== Australia ==
Ulrich arrived in Melbourne, Australia in 1853 where he worked as a geologist and later became a lecturer in mining at the University of Melbourne.

Ulrich was one of a number of influential German-speaking residents — such as Ludwig Becker, Hermann Beckler, William Blandowski, Amalie Dietrich, Wilhelm Haacke, Diedrich Henne, Gerard Krefft, Johann Luehmann, Johann Menge, Carl Mücke (a.k.a. Muecke), Ludwig Preiss, Carl Ludwig Christian Rümker (a.k.a. Ruemker), Moritz Richard Schomburgk, Richard Wolfgang Semon, Karl Theodor Staiger, Eugene von Guérard, Robert von Lendenfeld, Ferdinand von Mueller, Georg von Neumayer, and Carl Wilhelmi — who brought their "epistemic traditions" to Australia, and not only became "deeply entangled with the Australian colonial project", but also were "intricately involved in imagining, knowing and shaping colonial Australia" (Barrett, et al., 2018, p.2).

He was appointed curator of the mineral collection and lecturer in mineralogy at the Industrial and Technological Museum in Melbourne, and played a significant role in the establishment of the Mount Bischoff tin mine in Tasmania, and the appointment of its manager of 30 years, H. W. F. Kayser.

== Death ==
He died on 26 May 1900 examining rock specimens on Flagstaff Point, Port Chalmers near Dunedin, when he fell 100 feet (30 m). He was buried in the Dunedin Northern Cemetery.

== Works ==
- Gold and silver bearing reefs of St. Arnaud : report on the gold and silver bearing reefs of the district of St. Arnaud (1864)
- Notes and observations on the Nuggetty Reef, Maldon (1868)
- Contributions to the mineralogy of Victoria (1870)
- Mineral resources north of Port Augusta : report of the mineral resources of the country lying within 250 miles north of Port Augusta (1872)
- A descriptive catalogue of the specimens in the Industrial and Technological Museum, Melbourne, illustrating the rock system of Victoria (1875)
