= Carl Wilhelmi =

Johann Freiderich Carl Wilhelmi (1829–1884) was a Dresden born seedsman who made large collections of botanical specimens in southern Australia.

Wilhelmi was one of a number of influential German-speaking residents — such as Ludwig Becker, Hermann Beckler, William Blandowski, Amalie Dietrich, Wilhelm Haacke, Diedrich Henne, Gerard Krefft, Johann Luehmann, Johann Menge, Carl Mücke (a.k.a. Muecke), Ludwig Preiss, Carl Ludwig Christian Rümker (a.k.a. Ruemker), Moritz Richard Schomburgk, Richard Wolfgang Semon, Karl Theodor Staiger, George Ulrich, Eugene von Guérard, Robert von Lendenfeld, Ferdinand von Mueller, and Georg von Neumayer — who brought their "epistemic traditions" to Australia, and not only became "deeply entangled with the Australian colonial project", but also were "intricately involved in imagining, knowing and shaping colonial Australia" (Barrett, et al., 2018, p. 2).

He was sent to South Australia in 1849, by the Dresden Missionary Society, and began assembling collections there until 1855. He then moved to Victoria and collected seed and specimens there until returning to Dresden in 1869 (or 1865). He returned to his commercial interest is seeds before dying there in 1884.

Wilhelmi's material was mainly collected at the River Murray's lower reaches, at Eyre Peninsula, and in the south-east of South Australia. In Victoria he made expeditions to the Dandenongs and other mountainous areas of Western Victoria, and to Corner Inlet in the Gippsland regions. He briefly visited New South Wales and added specimens from Port Jackson. Most of his collection is held in the National Herbarium of Victoria in Melbourne. Wilhemi also published a report of cultural practices and foods of Indigenous Australians at Port Lincoln. A plant he collected at the same location was described by Ferdinand von Mueller and his name was commemorated in the specific epithet of what is currently described as Homoranthus wilhelmii.
