= Hermann Beckler =

German doctor

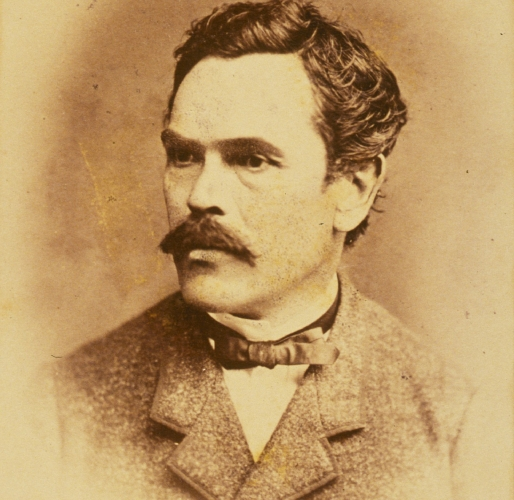
- Born: 28 September 1828; Höchstädt an der Donau (Bavaria, Germany)
- Died: 10 December 1914 (aged 86); Fischen im Allgäu
- Education: Munich, Bavaria
- Scientific career
- Fields: Medicine Botany

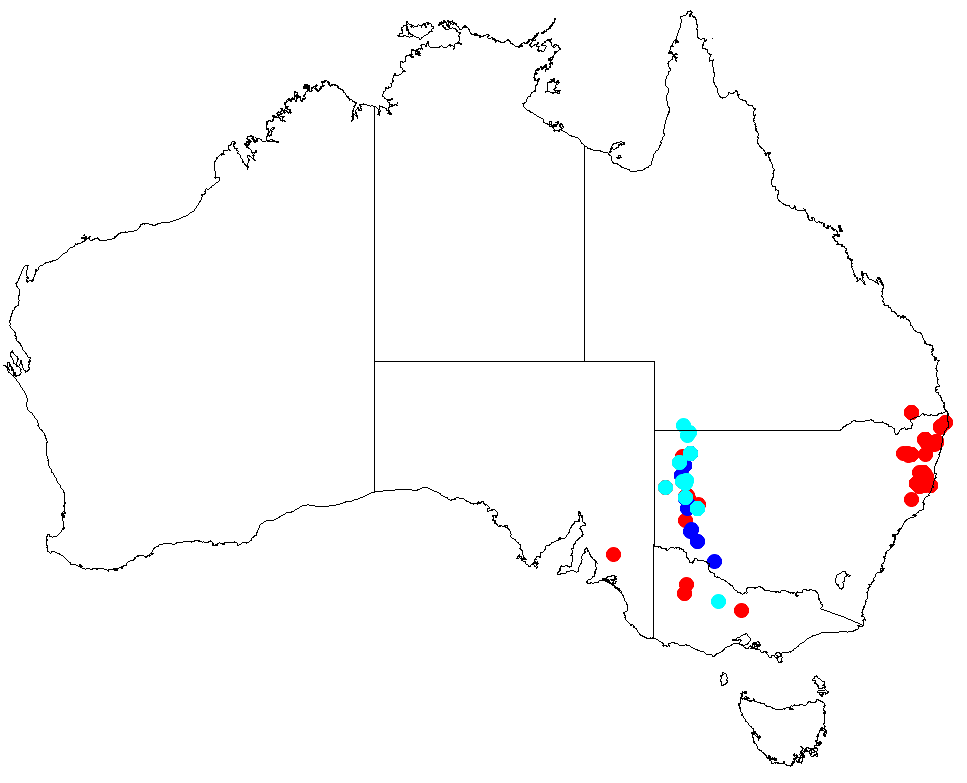
Collections map showing Beckler's explorations in Australia

Dr. Hermann Beckler (28 September 1828, in Höchstädt an der Donau – 10 December 1914, in Fischen im Allgäu) was a German doctor with an interest in botany. He went to Australia to collect specimens for Ferdinand von Mueller and served as medical officer and botanist for the Victoria Exploring Expedition (better known as the Burke and Wills expedition) in 1860.

== Life ==
Hermann Beckler grew up as one of five children. His parents, Kaspar Beckler and Franziska Speth, were married on 13 February 1827 in Höchstädt an der Donau. Hermann Beckler studied medicine in Munich, Germany. On 20 June 1855, he graduated with a thesis entitled, Ueber die Uterinblennorrhoe.

== Australia ==
On completing his studies on 30 September 1855, he left Hamburg for Australia on 30 September 1855 on the Godeffroy Line's Johann Caesar to work there as a doctor. He arrived at Moreton Bay on 2 February 1856, living in Ipswich, Brisbane, Tenterfield and Warwick (1856-1858), struggling to earn a living as a doctor, since he lacked the money to buy medical equipment and the necessary doctor's licence for New South Wales, and soon lost interest in working as a doctor. A former professor from Munich put him in touch with fellow German expatriates Ferdinand von Mueller and Georg von Neumayer, both in Melbourne.

Beckler was one of a number of influential German-speaking residents — such as Ludwig Becker, William Blandowski, Amalie Dietrich, Wilhelm Haacke, Diedrich Henne, Gerard Krefft, Johann Luehmann, Johann Menge, Carl Mücke (a.k.a. Muecke), Ludwig Preiss, Carl Ludwig Christian Rümker (a.k.a. Ruemker), Moritz Richard Schomburgk, Richard Wolfgang Semon, Karl Theodor Staiger, George Ulrich, Eugene von Guérard, Robert von Lendenfeld, Ferdinand von Mueller, Georg von Neumayer, and Carl Wilhelmi — who brought their "epistemic traditions" to Australia, and not only became "deeply entangled with the Australian colonial project", but also were "intricately involved in imagining, knowing and shaping colonial Australia" (Barrett, et al., 2018, p.2).

By January 1859, Beckler was working at the Melbourne Hospital. He was also employed by Ferdinand Mueller at Royal Botanical Gardens Melbourne from 1859 to 1860, collecting specimens around the Hastings, Macleay, Richmond and Clarence Rivers in New South Wales, and Moreton Bay (Queensland - at that time part of New South Wales).

== Burke and Wills ==
Recommended by a colleague at the Melbourne Hospital, Dr. William Gillbee (a member of the Exploration Committee of the Royal Society of Victoria), and supported by Neumayer and Mueller (also members of the society), he was appointed to the Victoria Exploring Expedition (VEE) at a meeting of the Exploration Committee on Friday, 13 July 1860, as both scientific and medical officer on a salary of £300 p.a. On 18 August 1860, he signed the Memorandum of Agreement at the Royal Society of Victoria.

Burke's erratic leadership of the expedition which led to the resignation of his second-in-command, George Landells, at Menindee, triggered Beckler's resignation from the expedition. The resignation of Mr. Landells, and Burke's splitting the expedition in two at Menindee, meant that no one was in charge in Menindee. Beckler's resignation was accepted but he agreed to stay with the men and supplies left at Menindee, which were meant to follow and form a depot at Cooper's Creek. Waiting for a replacement and despite his resignation, Beckler stayed until the bitter end, fulfilling his original obligations to the expedition both as doctor and scientific observer.

With the failure of the expedition, he was called before the commission of inquiry into 'the sufferings and death of Robert O'Hara Burke and William John Wills' in 1862. He found himself accused of betrayal and abandonment both in Australia and in Germany.

== Germany ==
After his return to Germany in 1862, he wrote a valuable account of the expedition in order to rehabilitate himself, which was not published at the time, but which was finally published in 1993 in English as A Journey to Cooper's Creek.

During his few years in Australia, Hermann Beckler wrote a large number of letters to his younger brother, Karl Beckler, describing his experiences, 19th-century Australia, and encounters with Australian aborigines. On his return to Germany, he practised as a doctor in Fischen im Allgäu until his death in 1914.

== Commemorated ==
In 1962, a plaque marking the birthplace of Dr. Hermann Beckler was displayed on the outside wall of a former bank building in Höchstädt an der Donau. During remodeling of the building in subsequent years, the plaque was placed in storage in an old city museum on Oberer Weberberg Strasse then was later moved to the new historic museum located in the former Rathaus building in the market square. On 17 June 2012, the plaque was reinstalled on the birth house of Hermann Beckler at Herzogin Anna Strasse 2 and was unveiled in a public ceremony in the presence of Dr. Werner Stirnweiss, members of the Höchstädt Historische Verein, mayor Hildegard Wanner, and interested citizens. A street was named Hermann-Beckler-Strasse in the Ensbach settlement of Höchstädt an der Donau with a sign, "Arzt und Forschungsreisender 1828 in Höchstädt geboren."

== Career ==
- Career position - Medical practitioner in Australia
- Career position - Employed by F. Mueller at Royal Botanic Gardens Melbourne
- Career event - Collected botanical specimens in Moreton Bay, Queensland and New South Wales rivers
- Taxonomy event - Eucalyptus microcorys F.Muell. Beckler collected a syntype
- Career event - Botanist and medical officer on the Burke and Wills Expedition

== Botany ==
His Bionomia profile (still incomplete) shows that at least 3179 of his botanical specimens still exist, and that they continue to contribute to scientific knowledge (with 8 specimens having been used in 4 scientific papers as of June 2020). These are held in at least 18 different herbaria. Specimens collected by Beckler are cared for at the National Herbarium of Victoria (MEL), Royal Botanic Gardens Victoria.

== Some of Beckler's sketches from the Burke and Wills expedition ==
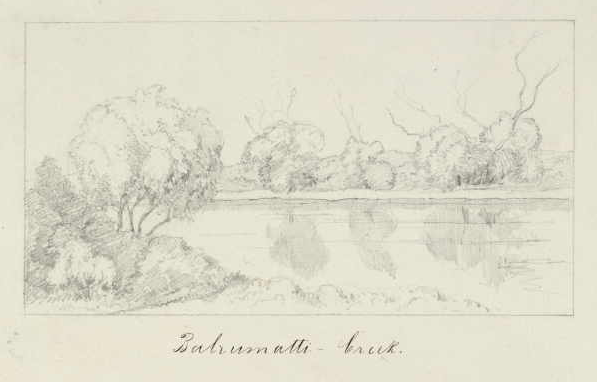
Balrumatti Creek

Bulla or Koorliatto, view from the camp up and down the Creek

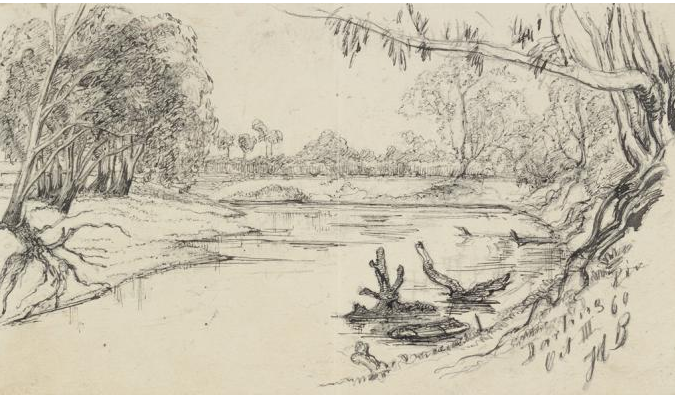
Darling River

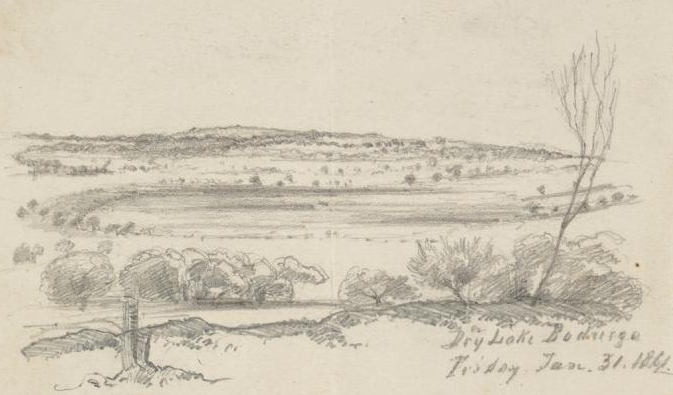
Dry Lake Bodurga

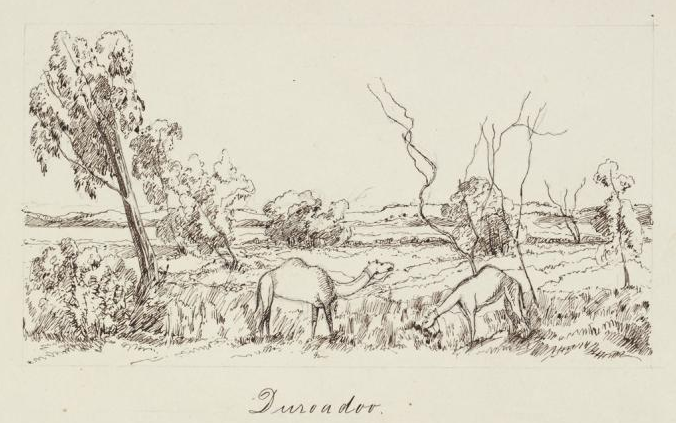
Duroadoo

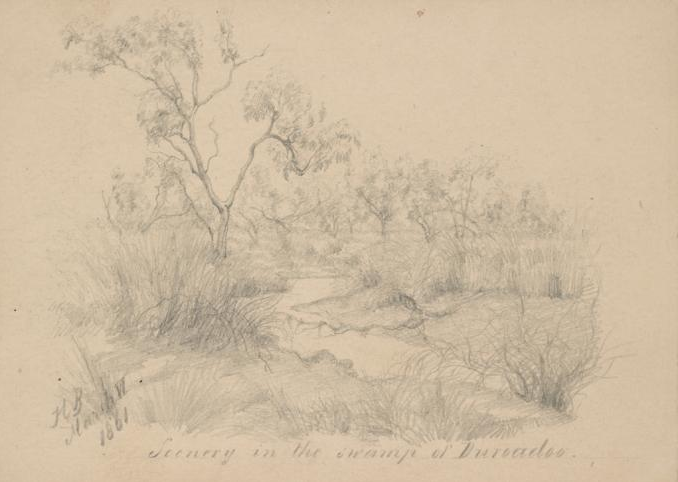
Duroadoo

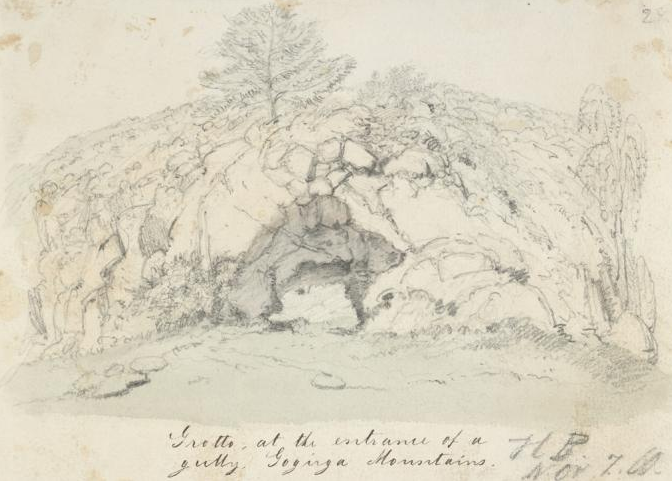
Grotto at the entrance of a gully, Goginga Mountains

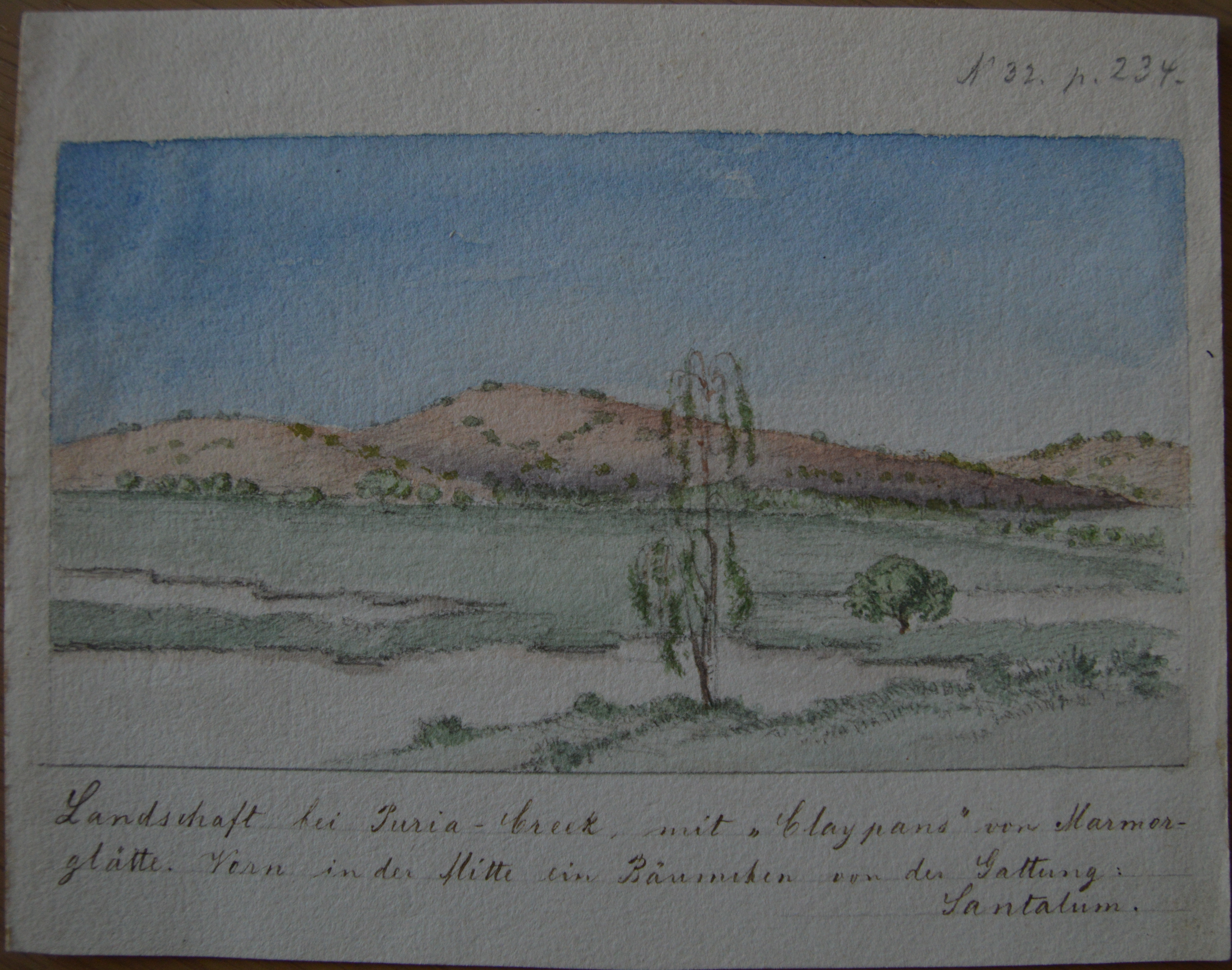
Puria Creek: claypans, Santalum

== Additional sources ==
- Burke and Wills Web: Beckler's Application
- Burke and Wills Web: Beckler's Instructions
- Burke and Wills Web: Dr Hermann Beckler's letter of resignation, Menindee, 17 October 1860.
- Burke and Wills Web: Commission of Enquiry Minutes of Evidence: Dr Hermann Beckler 13 December 1861

== Some plant names honouring Beckler ==
(incomplete list)

- Aster beckleri (F.Muell.) F.Muell. (1865) Fragmenta Phytographiae Australiae 5(34): 69.
- Eurybia beckleri F.Muell. (1864) The Vegetation of the Chatham-Islands 21
- Helichrysum beckleri (F.Muell.) Benth. (1867) Flora Australiensis 3: 627.
- Diasperus beckleri (Mull.Arg.) (1891) Kuntze Revisio Generum Plantarum 2: 598.
- Phyllanthus beckleri Müll.Arg. (1865) Linnaea 34: 74.
- Acacia beckleri Tindale (1965) in Hj. Eichler, Suppl. J. M. Black, Fl. S. Austral., ed. 2 173

(These may not be accepted names.)

== Publications ==
(incomplete)

- Beckler, Hermann: Ueber die Uterinblennorrhoe (on Uterine Blennorrhoaea). Doctoral Dissertation, München 1855.
- Beckler, Hermann: Entdeckungen in Australien. Briefe und Aufzeichnungen eines Deutschen 1855–1862. (Discoveries in Australia . Letters and records of a German 1855–1862.) Stuttgart: Thorbecke, 2000, ISBN 3-7995-0608-X
- Beckler, Hermann: Vom Edward's River nach Melbourne (From Edwards River to Melbourne). In: Das Ausland. Wochenschrift für Länder- und Völkerkunde. No. 13, 1860, S. 293–296.
- Beckler, Hermann: Die Musik der Vögel. In: Die Gartenlaube. 1867, S. 558–559
- Beckler, Hermann: Corroberri. Ein Beitrag zur Kenntnis der Musik bei den australischen Ureinwohnern. In: Der Globus. Volume 13, 1868, S. 82 f.
- Beckler, Hermann: Die Ureinwohner Australiens . In: Jahresbericht des Vereins für Erdkunde zu Dresden. 1872, S. 1–18. (The Aborigines of Australia . In: Annual report of the Association for Geography of Dresden)
- Beckler, Hermann: A Journey to Coopers Creek. Melbourne: Miegunya Press, 1989. Translated by Stephen Jeffries ISBN 9780522844849.
