= Diedrich Henne =

German-born botanist and plant collector

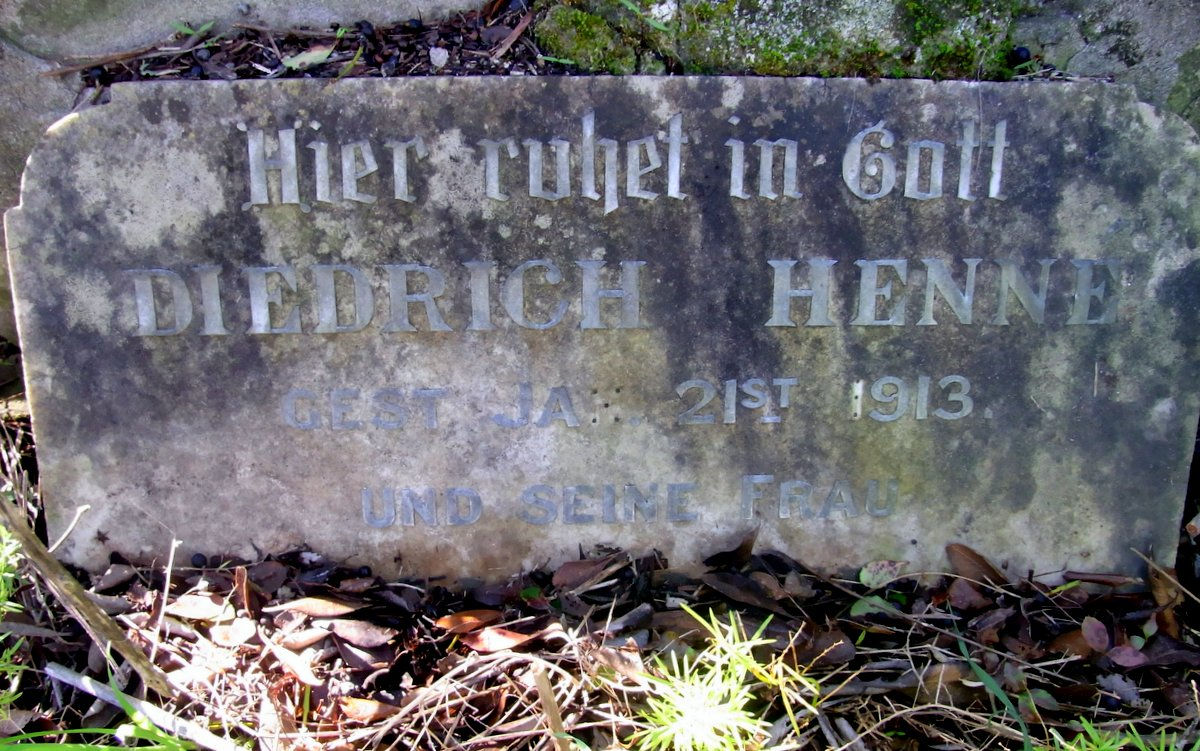
- Henne's grave
- Born: 1834; Hanover, Kingdom of Hanover
- Died: 21 January 1913 (aged 78); North Sydney, Australia
- Resting place: Gore Hill Cemetery
- Known for: Botanical collector

Diedrich Henne (1834 – 21 January 1913) was a German-born botanist and plant collector. He emigrated to Australia and was employed as an assistant to the colonial botanist Ferdinand von Mueller at the Melbourne Herbarium.

Henne was one of a number of influential German-speaking residents — such as Ludwig Becker, Hermann Beckler, William Blandowski, Amalie Dietrich, Wilhelm Haacke, Gerard Krefft, Friedrich Krichauff, Johann Luehmann, Johann Menge, Carl Mücke (a.k.a. Muecke), Ludwig Preiss, Carl Ludwig Christian Rümker (a.k.a. Ruemker), Moritz Richard Schomburgk, Richard Wolfgang Semon, Karl Theodor Staiger, George Ulrich, Eugene von Guérard, Robert von Lendenfeld, Ferdinand von Mueller, Georg von Neumayer, and Carl Wilhelmi — who brought their "epistemic traditions" to Australia, and not only became "deeply entangled with the Australian colonial project", but also were "intricately involved in imagining, knowing and shaping colonial Australia" (Barrett, et al., 2018, p.2).

He collected six cases of plants when employed as a botanist on the Burke and Wills rescue expedition. Frederick Manson Bailey lists twelve species of plants in the Queensland herbarium, collected by Henne.

The botanist Joseph Maiden wrote of Henne, "He was conveyed in the Victorian warship Victoria (Captain Norman) from Melbourne to Brisbane, thence to the Gulf of Carpentaria. Landsborough established his main camp or depot at Sweer's Island, went up the Albert River to the junction of Norman River, and established a depot at the hulk of the Firefly at this spot." Maiden also wrote "I have seen letters which show how highly Baron von Mueller held him in esteem for his personal qualities."

Henne collected the type specimen of the Deciduous Fig at Booby Island, in September 1861. It was named Ficus henneana in his honour, by Friedrich Miquel. Henne's diary (in German) is housed at the Mitchell library. He died in Sydney aged 78.
