= Adelaide Liedertafel =

German male choir in Australia

The Adelaide Liedertafel (Die Adelaider Liedertafel) is a traditional German male choir, one of several Liedertafeln, or song societies, in the history of Adelaide and South Australia. It is Australia's oldest male choir.

== History ==
The first "Adelaide Liedertafel" met in 1854 and 1855 at Wiener & Fischer's coffee house on Rundle Street, but disbanded when Robert Wiener and George Fischer left for Tanunda, where they operated the Tanunda Hotel. This was not the first Liedertafel in the city however, as the Deutsche Liedertafel, with which Carl Linger (composer, "Song of Australia") was closely identified if not the leader, was performing as early as January 1850, pre-dating the founding of the German Club in 1854, both associated with the Hamburg Hotel.

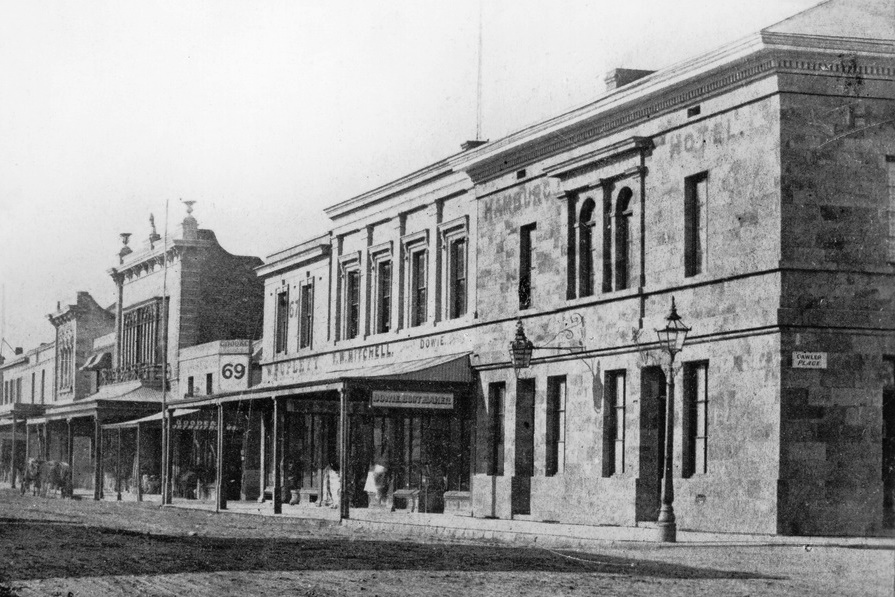
Hamburg Hotel (Oriental Hotel from 1915), Rundle Street, south-east corner of Gawler Place,1864

The better-known, and current, Adelaide Liedertafel was founded in Adelaide in December 1858 by members of the Deutscher Club of Adelaide, notably Linger and Carl Mumme. They comprised much of the younger membership of the Club, who felt stultified by the reactionary attitudes of the older members. They broke away completely from the Club, which was by then meeting at the Hotel Europe, and made their headquarters back at "Father" Kopke's Hamburg Hotel.

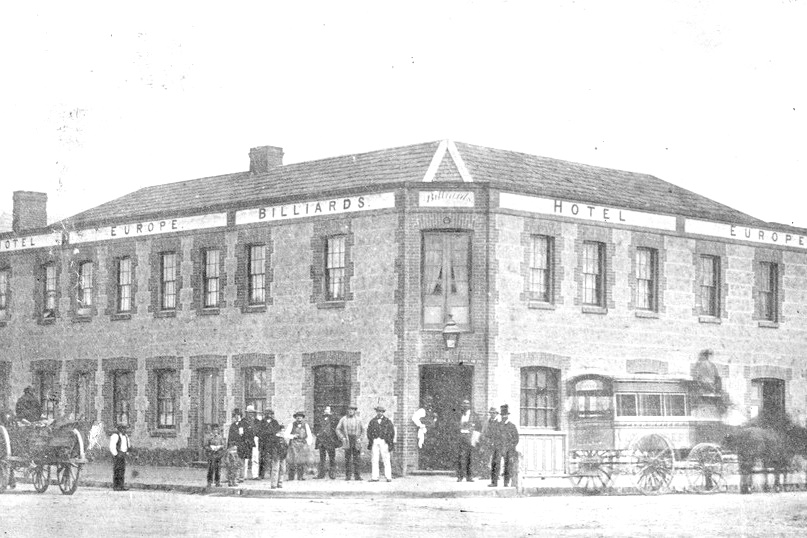
Hotel Europe, northwest corner Grenfell Street and Gawler Place c. 1863

The first office-holders were Johann Friedrich Martin "Friedrich" "Fritz" Armbrüster (June 1826 – 10 February 1897) president; Adolph Schlüter (c. 1835 – 30 March 1873) secretary and librarian; and Carl Linger (leader / conductor). Tenors were Julius H. C. Eitzen (1830–1897), (Note: Eitzen emigrated on August in 1855) Wilhelm Nitschke (1816–1889), Johann Gottlieb Christoph / Christov Reinhardt (c. 1824 – 6 August 1900), (Note: Reinhardt married Emilie Henriette Ohlmeyer in 1849; daughter Agnes Louise Matina Reinhardt married Ferdinand Julius Sobels, daughter (Hermina Sophie) Ida Reinhardt (1858–1914) was fine singer.) and Schlüter; second tenors: Ludwig "Louis" Maraun (c. 1820 – 3 November 1898), Hermann Heinrich Samuel Nettelbeck (1839–1918), (Note: Nettelbeck (often Nettlebeck) arrived on Wilhelmina Maria August 1849; married Auguste Ernestine Erfurth (1843–1909) in 1861.) and Frederick Wurm; basses: Oscar Ziegler ( –1916), (Note: Ziegler, who arrived aboard Leontine in August 1850, was a member of the original Deutsche Liedertafel, and in 1897 the longest serving member of both the Adelaide Liedertafel and the Deutsche Club.) Braun, C. G. Schedlich, (Note: Carl Gustav Schedlich (c. 1821 – August 1901) arrived December 1847 aboard Hermann von Beckerath.) and Charles Bielefeld; (Note: Bielefeld arrived on the Leontine May 1850; not to be confused with Carl Bielefeldt (1821–1897), tobacconist, who arrived 1849 on Steinwärder.) second basses: F. Armbrüster, J. W. Schierenbeck, (Note: (Johann) Wilhelm Schierenbeck arrived January 1855 on the Johann Caesar, died 21 August 1887 in Bremen, Germany) and G. V. Eimer. (Note: Georg Valentin Eimer (c. 1824 – 4 April 1901) and wife Clara Wilhelmine Louise née Mehlmann ( –1904) arrived May 1855 aboard the August. He was part owner of the Australische Zeitung.)

They performed at the Linger's funeral ceremony, as did the Brunswick (Brass) Band, of which he was also a founder.

A notable concert was held at White's Rooms by the Liedertafel and Brunswick Band in August 1864 in aid of the Schleswig-Holstein Relief Fund. The Schleswig War of 1864 was a suppression of German nationals in the Danish province. Other charitable concerts were for the Indian Famine Fund and the Patriotic War Fund at the time of the Second Boer War. They performed for dignitaries such as the Duke of York (later George V). (Note: George, Duke of York, visited SA twice: in June 1900 and July 1901, and was serenaded by the Liedertafel on both occasions.) They appeared with musicians Antoinette Link, (Note: Link was a statuesque German soprano, who played Elsa in Lohengrin and Marguerite in Faust) Amy Sherwin, Ilma de Murska, Heinrich Koehler, (Note: Heinrich Köhler, a young German pianist and composer, toured Australia 1886–1887) and Antonia Dolores. (Note: Born Antoinette Trebelli, Dolores was a soprano, daughter of the contralto (or mezzo) Zelia Trebelli-Bettini.)

In 1867, following the death of Spietzschka, Carl Püttmann was appointed conductor, a post he held for 20 years. The first performance given by the choir under his baton was a comic opera Die Mordgrundbruck bei Dresden (Note: Composer was (Ernst) Julius Otto (1 September 1804 – 5 March 1877) from Dresden.) at the Theatre Royal in 1868; the first opera performed by amateurs in Adelaide.

The club was reorganised in 1871.

The choir attended the 1874 Sängerfest in Tanunda, along with the Adelaide Turnverein and Adelaide Liederkranz, hosted by the Tanunda Liedertafel and Tanunda Riflemen.

Quarterly social gatherings were held at the Hotel Europe 1877, "smoke socials" organised by Armbrüster. In that year "passive" (non-singing) members were first admitted, to the financial benefit of the Club.

The club rented a large room in the Freemasons' Hall, adjacent Earl of Zetland Hotel, Flinders Street, from ?? to 1880, the German Club's Albert Hall, then from 1882 the King of Hanover Hotel.

At the 22nd anniversary of its foundation in 1880 at the Albert Hall, the Liedertafel performed exclusively compositions by their patron Franz Abt, under the Püttmann baton, Otto Stange (Note: Otto Stange was a Professor of Music in Adelaide, married Maria Hesse of St. Kilda in 1876; they had two daughters then returned to Germany, where she died in Baden-Baden in 1891, perhaps of tuberculosis. He married again in Ireland in 1895, to Jeanie French.) on piano.

In March 1891 the German Singing Society (organiser H. Heinicke) amalgamated with the Liedertafel, as did several other minor German societies.

A "Grand Anniversary Concert" was held at the Adelaide Town Hall in September 1905.

At their 50th anniversary in September 1908, a great concert was held at the Jubilee Exhibition Building on North Terrace by the choirs of South Australia and Broken Hill, Ada Crossley, the Governor and Lady Le Hunte attending. Participating alongside the Liedertafel were the Adelaide Choral Society, Bach Society, Orpheus Society, (Note: Founded 1888 by Charles Joseph Stevens) Glee Club, Port Adelaide Orpheus Society, and the Broken Hill Quartet Club.

The club disbanded in 1914, and re-formed after the Great War, but for the members' pleasure only; they held no further concerts. It was re-formed again after World War II by Hermann Homburg, and survives to this day, though with reduced and ageing membership.

== Office holders ==
Presidents
This list is incomplete

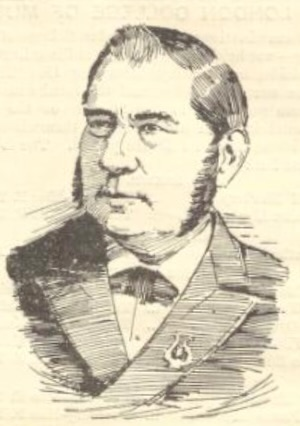
Friedrich Armbrüster

- 1858 (Johann) Wilhelm Schierenbeck (died in Germany 1887)
- 1873–1889 (at least) Friedrich Armbrüster
- 1874 H. Nettelbeck (perhaps Herman Heinrich Samuel Nettelbeck (1839 – 28 May 1918)
- 1891–1904 Frederick Basse (c. 1851 – 17 April 1913)
- 1908–1911 H. Rudolph "Rudi" Büring, sen. (25 August 1844 – 16 August 1923)

Conductors

- 1858–1864 Carl Linger
- 1864–1865 Carl Julius Kunze (c. 1825–1868)
- 1865–1867 Wilhelm Spietschka (c. 1840 – 22 January 1867) (Note: Spietschka was born in Liebenau, Bohemia, inherited a fortune from father who owned a glass factory, arrived in Adelaide in 1862 and taught music) died after riding accident; mentioned in Loyau's Notable South Australians.
- 1867–1886 Carl Püttmann
- 1886–1891 C. E. Mumme (1839–1919) deputised for Püttmann on occasion from 1879; was also conductor of the Catholic Cathedral Choir. (Note: Mumme married Mary Maud McLaughlin (c. 1838–1903) in 1860. The violinist Albert Redford Mumme (1868–1969) was a nephew.)
- 1889–1890 W. R. Pybus had difficulty in the position due to his lack of German.
- 1891–1914 Hermann Heinicke (1863–1949). He founded Adelaide Grand Orchestra in 1893.
- 1914 and post-war F. Ochernal

Secretaries

- Frederick Hermann Otto (c. 1848 - 4 October 1894)
- 1908 F. Ochernal
