= Carl Ludwig Christian Rümker =

German astronomer (1788–1862)

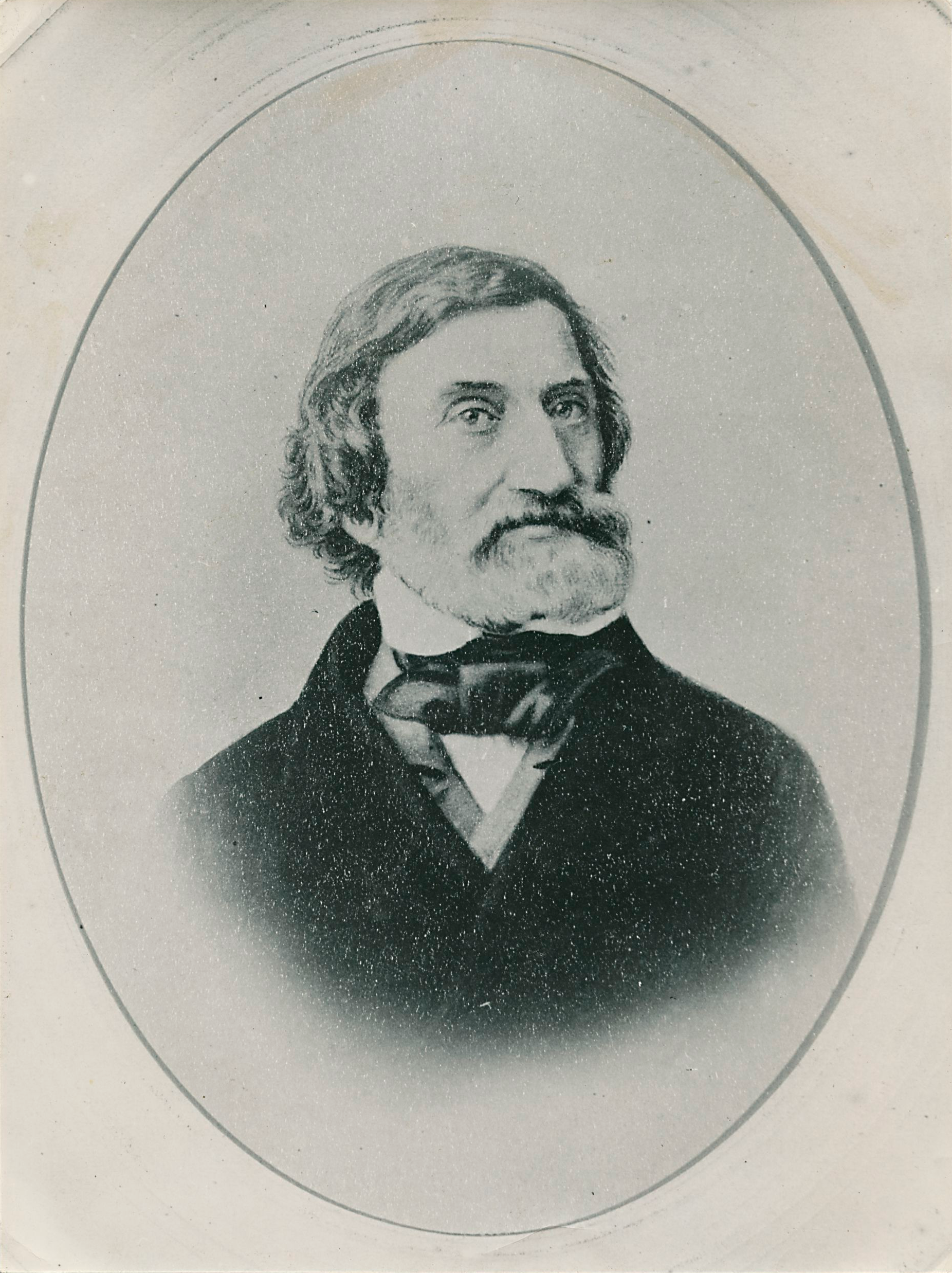
- Carl Ludwig Christian Rümker
- Born: 28 May 1788; Burg Stargard, Mecklenburg, Germany
- Died: 21 December 1862 (aged 74); Lisbon, Portugal
- Education: Builders' Academy, Berlin
- Children: Georg Friedrich Wilhelm Rümker
- Father: J. F. Rümker
- Awards: Gold medal of the Institut de France; Silver medal of the Royal Astronomical Society
- Scientific career
- Fields: Education, Astronomy

Carl Ludwig Christian Rümker (28 May 1788 – 21 December 1862) was a German astronomer.

== Early life (1788-1821) ==
Rümker was born in Burg Stargard, in Mecklenburg, Germany, the son of J. F. Rümker, a court-councillor. He showed an aptitude for mathematics and studied at the Builders' Academy, Berlin, graduating in 1807 as a master builder. Instead of a career in building, he taught mathematics in Hamburg until 1809 when he went to England.

Rümker served as a midshipman in the British East India Company and then in the British merchant navy from 1811 until 1813. In July 1813 he was seized by a pressgang and joined the Royal Navy. He served in the Royal Navy as a schoolmaster until 1817 on HMS Benbow, Montague and Albion taking part in the expedition to Algiers in 1816 whilst on the Albion. In 1817 he met Austrian astronomer Baron Franz Xaver von Zach, who influenced Rümker to study astronomy. Rümker was director of the school of navigation at Hamburg from 1819 until 1820.

== Life in New South Wales (Australia) (1821-1830) ==
Rümker was one of a number of influential German-speaking residents — such as Ludwig Becker, Hermann Beckler, William Blandowski, Amalie Dietrich, Wilhelm Haacke, Diedrich Henne, Gerard Krefft, Johann Luehmann, Johann Menge, Carl Mücke (a.k.a. Muecke), Ludwig Preiss, Moritz Richard Schomburgk, Richard Wolfgang Semon, Karl Theodor Staiger, George Ulrich, Eugene von Guérard, Robert von Lendenfeld, Ferdinand von Mueller, Georg von Neumayer, and Carl Wilhelmi — who brought their "epistemic traditions" to Australia, and not only became "deeply entangled with the Australian colonial project", but also were "intricately involved in imagining, knowing and shaping colonial Australia" (Barrett, et al., 2018, p.2). (Note: In relation to "Australasia", another German-speaking explorer and geologist, Julius von Haast (1822-1887), was appointed as the inaugural Curator/Director of the Canterbury Museum, in Christchurch, New Zealand in 1867.)

== Life in Hamburg, Germany (1830-1857) ==
Rümker returned to Europe in 1830 and took charge of the new Hamburg Observatory after the death of Johann Georg Repsold in 1830. His chief work was concerned with the cataloging of stars: a preliminary catalogue of the stars of the Southern Hemisphere was published in 1832 at Hamburg, and from 1846 to 1852 he published his great catalogue of 12,000 stars. He served as the director of Hamburger Sternwarte then located at Stadtwall and funded by the city of Hamburg as Christian Karl Ludwig Rümker from 1833 to 1857.

== Final years and legacy (1857-1862) ==
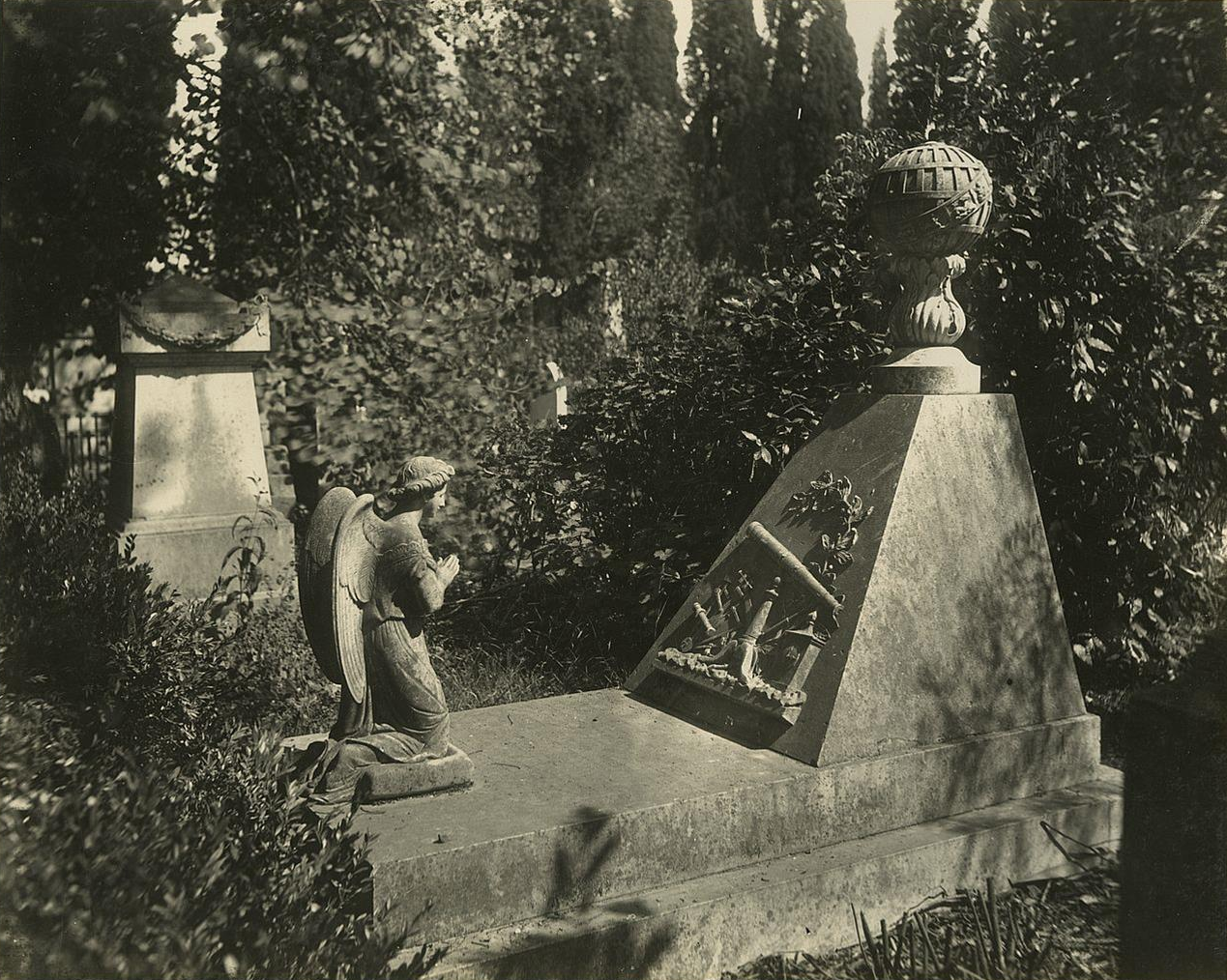
Tomb of Carl Ludwig Christian Rümker in the British Cemetery, Lisbon

In 1857, Rümker resided at Lisbon, Portugal, where he died in 1862. His son was also an astronomer, Georg Friedrich Wilhelm Rümker, who was born in 1832, at Hamburg. He took over as director of Hamburger Sternwarte in 1857, where he served until his death in 1900. The Hamburger Sternwarte at Millerntor site was demolished when the observatory moved to Bergedorf under the direction of Richard Schorr for better astronomical seeing (the telescopes were moved), and the area eventually became the location of the Hamburg Museum. From 1901 to 1922 the new Hamburg observatory at Bergedorf renewed the observation of Rümker's catalog with its 12,000 stars. The catalog Carl Rümkers Hamburger Sternverzeichnis 1845.0 was published in 1923.

The lunar massif Mons Rümker is named for him.

== Notable writings ==
- Preliminary catalogue of fixed stars, etc. (1832)
- Handbuch der Schiffahrtskunde (1857)
- Mittlere Örter von 12.000 Fixsternen (1843–1852, 4 parts; new series 1857, 2 parts)
- Längenbestimmung durch den Mond (1849).
