= Smoke night =

Australian social event and tradition

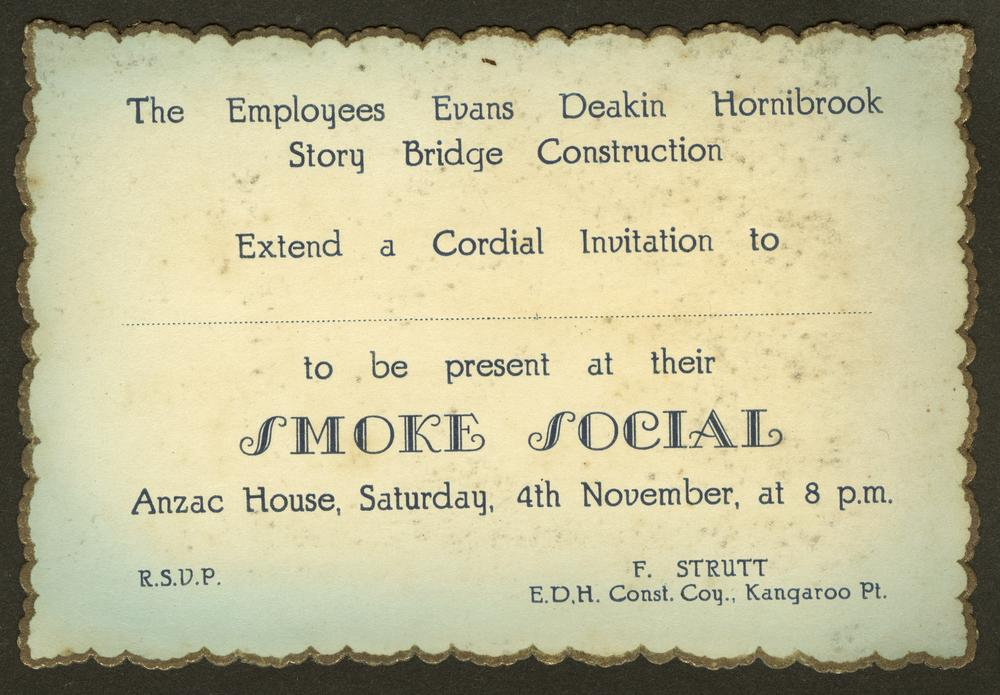
Story Bridge Smoke Social invitation card

The smoke night or smoke social was a predominantly Australian form of male only social event in late nineteenth and early twentieth century Australasia.

== Background ==
Large groups of Australian men gathered in a venue to smoke tobacco together in what they termed a smoke night. These lasted until the early 1940s. These events were socially significant, and often coupled with a formal dinner, an annual general meeting or a musical revue. While the full spectrum of Australian men participated in smoke socials—from Parliamentarians through to Port Kembla workers—the smoke night held an allure of classy behaviour and social respectability for participating men. Smoke socials were run by football clubs, charitable organizations, civic organizations, trade unions, and governments.

== See also ==
- Smoking in Australia
- Smoking in New Zealand
