= Wilhelm Haacke =

German zoologist (1855–1912)

Johann Wilhelm Haacke (23 August 1855 – 6 December 1912) was a German zoologist born in Clenze, which is now Lower Saxony, who served as Director of the South Australian Museum in Adelaide from 1882 to 1884.

== Career ==
He studied zoology at the University of Jena, earning his doctorate in 1878. Afterwards he worked as an assistant of Ernst Haeckel in Jena and at the university of Kiel. In 1881 he emigrated to New Zealand, working at the Otago Museum in Dunedin, under Professor Parker, and the Canterbury Museum, Christchurch under Professor von Haast.

The following year he moved to Australia, where he replaced F. G. Waterhouse as Director of the South Australian Museum in Adelaide, and was a founding member of the Field Naturalists Society of South Australia. Haacke was one of a number of influential German-speaking residents — such as Ludwig Becker, Hermann Beckler, William Blandowski, Amalie Dietrich, Diedrich Henne, Gerard Krefft, Johann Luehmann, Johann Menge, Ludwig Preiss, Carl Ludwig Christian Rümker (a.k.a. Ruemker), Moritz Richard Schomburgk, Richard Wolfgang Semon, Karl Theodor Staiger, George Ulrich, Eugene von Guérard, Robert von Lendenfeld, Ferdinand von Mueller, Georg von Neumayer, and Carl Wilhelmi — who brought their "epistemic traditions" to Australia, and not only became "deeply entangled with the Australian colonial project", but also were "intricately involved in imagining, knowing and shaping colonial Australia" (Barrett, et al., 2018, p. 2).

In August 1884 he laid to rest an old mystery about echidnas, proving they are oviparous not viviparous, with a specimen sent to the museum by a naturalist on Kangaroo Island. His work and the liberality with which he was treated attracted some criticism, as did his bombastic self-promotion. He resigned his position in October 1884, after a series of disputes with the museum's management but did not leave the colony.

He served as zoologist with the 1885 Geographical Society of Australasia's expedition to the Fly River, Papua New Guinea. In June 1886 he announced his imminent departure for Europe, and was invited by a large deputation of German settlers to represent them at an Allgemeiner Deutscher Kongress to be held in Berlin that September but declined, and left South Australia around July 1886 without fanfare.

From 1888 to 1893 he was director of the zoo in Frankfurt-am-Main, and afterwards was a lecturer at Darmstadt University of Technology (until 1897). Later, he worked as a private scholar and grammar school teacher. He died in Lüneburg on December 6, 1912.

Haacke is remembered for research of oviparity in monotremes, and studies involving the morphology of jellyfish and corals. In 1893 he coined the evolutionary term "orthogenesis". He also conducted investigations in the field of animal husbandry.

== Evolutionary views ==
Haacke studied under Ernst Haeckel. He later turned against Haeckel for holding Darwinist views. He was also a critic of August Weismann. He experimented with mice and proposed a system of heredity similar to Gregor Mendel but differed in results. Haacke was a neo-Lamarckian and proponent of the inheritance of acquired characters.

Haacke believed that cells consist of individuals called gemmaria that operate as hereditary units. These consist of even smaller units known as gemmae. He believed these units to explain neo-Lamarckian inheritance. He was a proponent of orthogenesis. He held that from his theory of epimorphism evolution is a directed process tending towards perfection.

== Selected writings ==
He made contributions to Brehms Tierleben, a popular zoological compendium published in several editions, and with illustrator Wilhelm Kuhnert published Das Tierleben der Erde. Other noteworthy written efforts include:

- Die Schöpfung der Tierwelt (1893)
- Gestaltung und Vererbung. Eine Entwickelungsmechanik der Organismen (1893)
- Die Schöpfung of Menschen und seiner Ideal. Ein Versuch zur Versöhnung zwischen Religion und Wissenschaft (1895)
- Aus der Schöpfungswerkstatt (1897)
- Grundriss der Entwickelungsmechanik (1897)

== Taxon named in his honor ==
The Wavy grubfish Parapercis haackei is named in his honor.
