= Ludwig Preiss =

German-born British botanist (1811–1883)

- Born: 21 November 1811; Herzberg am Harz
- Died: 21 May 1883 (aged 71); Herzberg am Harz
- Scientific career
- Fields: Botany; Zoology

Johann August Ludwig Preiss (21 November 1811 – 21 May 1883) was a German-born British botanist and zoologist.

== Early life ==
Preiss was born in Herzberg am Harz. He obtained a doctorate, probably at Hamburg, then emigrated to Western Australia.

== Australia ==
Preiss was one of a number of influential German-speaking residents — such as Ludwig Becker, Hermann Beckler, William Blandowski, Amalie Dietrich, Wilhelm Haacke, Diedrich Henne, Gerard Krefft, Johann Luehmann, Johann Menge, Carl Mücke (a.k.a. Muecke), Carl Ludwig Christian Rümker (a.k.a. Ruemker), Moritz Richard Schomburgk, Richard Wolfgang Semon, Karl Theodor Staiger, George Ulrich, Eugene von Guérard, Robert von Lendenfeld, Ferdinand von Mueller, Georg von Neumayer, and Carl Wilhelmi — who brought their "epistemic traditions" to Australia, and not only became "deeply entangled with the Australian colonial project", but also were "intricately involved in imagining, knowing and shaping colonial Australia" (Barrett, et al., 2018, p.2).

He arrived at the Swan River Colony on board the Britmart on 4 December 1838, remaining there until January 1842; during this time he became a British subject.

=== Specimens ===
During his time in Western Australia, Preiss collected about 200,000 plant specimens, containing from 3,000 to 4,000 species. His collections, together with those of James Drummond, formed the basis for early study of Western Australian flora. In 1842, he left Western Australia for London, where he broke up and sold his plant collection to recoup his costs. Various botanists published species based on his specimens, and these were later collated by Johann Lehmann to form the multi-volume Plantae Preissianae Sive Enumeratio Plantarum Quas in Australasia Occidentali et Meridionale Occidentali Annis 1838-41 Collegit L, published in Hamburg between 1844 and 1848. Today, over 4,000 of his specimens are cared for at the National Herbarium of Victoria (MEL), Royal Botanic Gardens Victoria, almost 2,000 specimens at Lund University Biological Museum, and other institutions.

The specimens collected by Preiss were not limited to plants: they included birds, reptiles, insects and molluscs. The molluscs were described by Karl Theodor Menke and published in Hanover in 1843 titled Molluscorum Novae Hollandiae Specimen. In October 1839, Preiss tried to sell his collection of bird skins to the colonial government in Perth, but it was declined. Preiss's collection of animals was sold in parts throughout Europe to museums and collectors. The only distinguishable collection of any note, still extant, is in the Municipal Museum of Halberstadt. The collection of bird skins, representatives of 181 species, was also distributed to various museums; one set that was viewed in 1937 at Hamburg's Zoölogical Museum was lost when the building was destroyed in the subsequent bombing campaigns at the city.

The first specimen of the Western Swamp Tortoise was collected by Preiss in 1839 and sent to the Vienna Museum where it was labelled New Holland, but was not named Pseudemydura umbrina until 1901 by Seibenrock. No further collections of the species were recorded until 1953.

== Germany ==
Preiss returned to Herzberg am Harz in 1844 and settled there. He died there on 21 May 1883. It had been on his recommendation that Ferdinand von Mueller moved to Australia in 1847.

== Commemorated ==
Preiss is commemorated in the names of about 100 species of flora in Western Australia, including plants in the genera Acacia, Allocasuarina, Eucalyptus, Grevillea, Hakea, Kunzea, Melaleuca, Santalum, Xanthorrhoea and Callitris.
