= Carl Mumme =

German singer and conductor

Carl (or Charles) Edmund Mumme (1839 – 12 June 1919) was a German immigrant to South Australia, remembered as a tenor singer and conductor of the Adelaide Liedertafel and several Roman Catholic church choirs, including St Francis Xavier's Cathedral, Adelaide.

== History ==
Mumme arrived with his parents Frederick William Mumme (died 1866?) a woollens manufacturer, and Marie Elizabeth Mumme (c. January 1812 – c. May 1904) from Hamburg in September 1857 aboard the ship Peter Godefroy, also reported as Peter Godfrey.

In 1859 Mumme was part-owner of a drapery shop at 134 Rundle Street, Adelaide, in partnership with brothers Emil and Gustav and brother-in-law Johannes Carl Friedrich Brandenburg. The venture failed in 1862, and they were forced to sell up their stock, following which Mumme was in 1865 found insolvent, their losses being mostly bad debts.

He was a member of the Adelaide Liedertafel and soloist from 1864 or earlier, and served as president in 1876 and conductor 1879–1889.

He was a practising Catholic, and frequently performed secular and sacred songs at church functions. He was conductor of St Francis Xavier's cathedral choir from 1877 to around 1890, the choir being celebrated for its renditions of Masses no. 12 of Mozart; 1, 2, 3, and 16 of Haydn, and 3 of Giorza. He was the inaugural choirmaster of the Church of the Holy Cross, Goodwood, in 1894; succeeded by W. J. McBride.

In March 1894 Mumme left for Western Australia, where he was soon "back in harness", and in October led the massed choirs of Perth and Fremantle in the Corpus Christi procession at Subiaco. cathedral choirmaster to 1897. In 1903 he was licensed as a spirits merchant, located at 217 Fitzgerald Street.

He died age 82

A captioned photo of Mumme appeared in a newspaper nearly two years later with no obvious relevance.

== Family ==
Mumme married Mary Maud McLaughlin (1838 – 21 June 1903) in 1860, had a home on Hutt Street. Their family includes:

- Anna Marie Mumme (11 May 1863 – ) married Richard Blades (died 1903) in 1883.
- Frederick William Mumme (1864–1866)
- Agatha Adelaide Mumme (1866 – 8 September 1928) married Thomas Conway in 1895
- Carl or Charles Edmund "Duck" Mumme (1868 – 28 September 1920), brickmaker of Glen Forrest, Western Australia, who died of injuries received near railway line, after a drinking session, and was buried at Karrakatta Cemetery. It is likely his wife and son "Gussie" left WA in 1921 to live with relatives in Adelaide.
- Joseph Daniel Mumme (1870 – )
- Frank Aloysius Mumme (1 Jan 1872 – 19 May 1952) - Wellington, Western Australia
- Frederick Vincent Mumme (1876–1877)
- Walter Giorga/George Mumme (1878 – )
- Dorothy Mumme, of Mount Lawley, married to Ernest Wallace after 1923 but later Mrs Smith or Wallace-Smith.

=== Children of Frederick and Marie Mumme ===
- William Mumme (April 1837 – c. 23 March 1921) was from 1872 employed by the Western Australian Stanley Brewery (a predecessor of Emu Brewery). He was a founder of the (later Royal) Perth Yacht Club.
- Heinrich Gustav Mumme (1836–1893) married Emily Clisby (died 1924) in a private ceremony conducted by J. C. Woods on 27 February 1864.

- Albert Redford Mumme (1868–1969), violinist, married Annie Elizabeth ?? in 1924

- Friedrich Wilhelm Mumme Jr (26 April 1837 – 23 March 1921)
- Carl or Charles Edmund Mumme (1839–1919), subject of this article
- (John or Johannes) Emil Mumme (c. 1840 – 12 May 1917) married Lydia Featherstone (1844 – 13 December 1896) of Brighton on 23 May 1863. They had five children in South Australia, then left for Germany 1872, returning around 1888, settling at "Hawthorn Park", Preston, Victoria sometime before 1892, then moved to Elsternwick before 1901. They had a large family. He married again, to divorcee Violet Keam, née Minnist, whose only son was killed at Gallipoli
- Helene Auguste Mumme (1842 – 17 February 1926) married Johannes Carl Friedrich Brandenburg (c. 1833 – 14 October 1876) on 4 July 1860. She married again, to Otto Charles Emil Junge, of Nuriootpa
- Albert Henry Mumme (1851–1920) of Adelaide married Sarah James Warren
- Ida Henriette Mumme (13 October 1852 – 1923) married Eugen Victor Ottoman Muecke (c. 1843 – 20 February 1882) in 1875, had home at High street, Burnside, where her mother, Marie Elizabeth Mumme, spent her last 20 years.
- Carl August Mumme (1855–1911) married Fanny Leader in 1884
