= Paulding =

Paulding may refer to:

== Places ==
Antarctica

- Paulding Bay

United States

- Paulding, Michigan, an unincorporated community
- Paulding, Mississippi, an unincorporated community
- Paulding, Missouri, a ghost town
- Paulding, Ohio, a village
- Paulding County, Georgia
- Paulding County, Ohio

== US Navy ships ==
- Paulding-class destroyer, a class of 21 ships
  - USS Paulding (DD-22), lead ship of the class
- USS James K. Paulding (DD-238), a US Navy destroyer

== People ==
- Paulding (surname)
- Paulding Farnham (1859–1927), American jewelry designer, sculptor and metallurgist who worked for Tiffany & Co.

== Other uses ==
- Ruth Paulding Middle School, California

== See also ==
- Paulding Light, a light seen in a valley outside Paulding, Michigan; thought to have been supernatural, but later proven to be car headlights
