= List of Antarctic ice shelves =

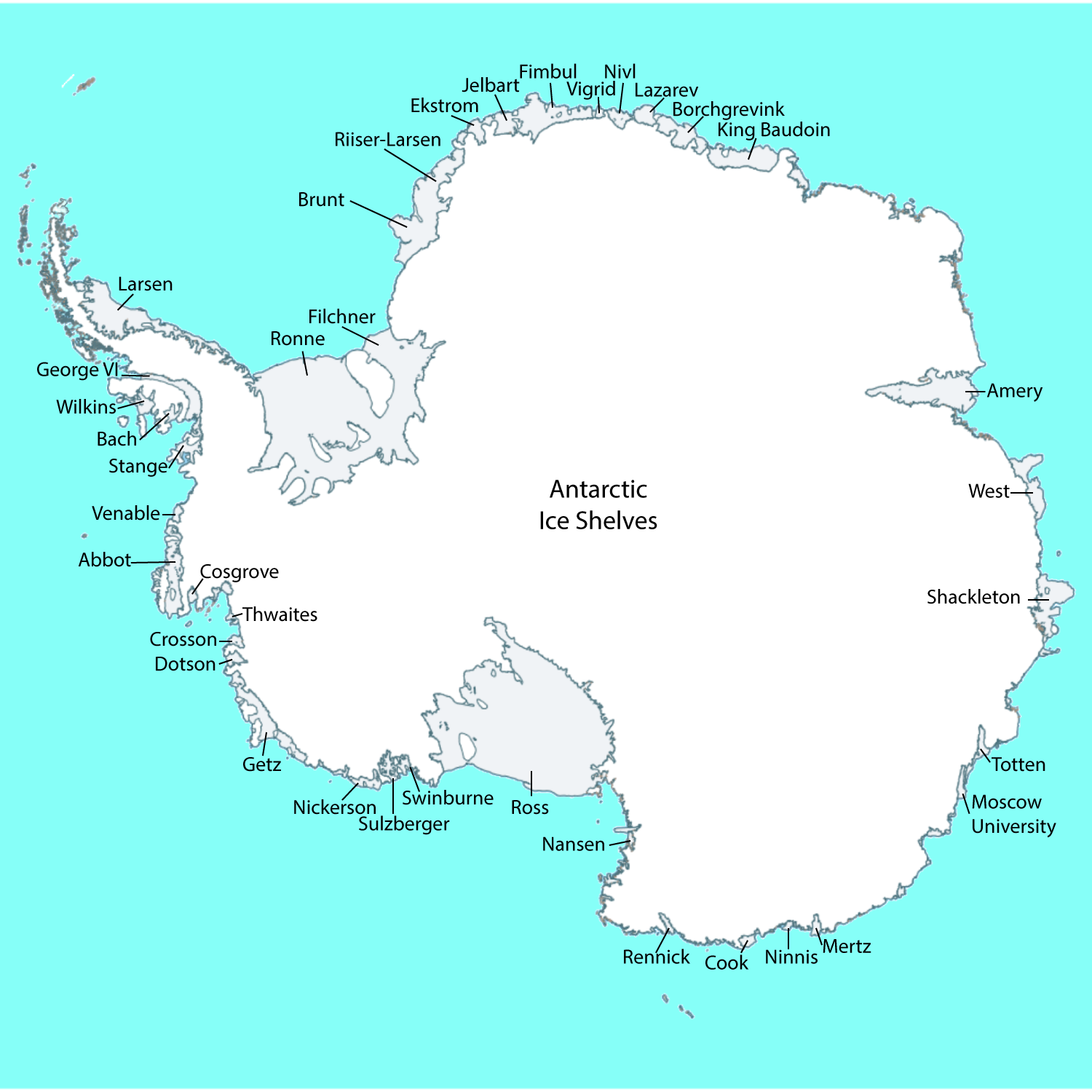
Antarctic ice shelves

Antarctica's major ice shelves: Ross (472,960 km^{2}) Filchner-Ronne (422,420 km^{2}) Amery (62,620 km^{2}) Larsen (48,600 km^{2}) Riiser-Larsen (48,180 km^{2}) Fimbul (41,060 km^{2}) Shackleton (33,820 km^{2}) George VI (23,880 km^{2}) West (16,370 km^{2}) Wilkins (13,680 km^{2})

This is a list of Antarctic ice shelves.

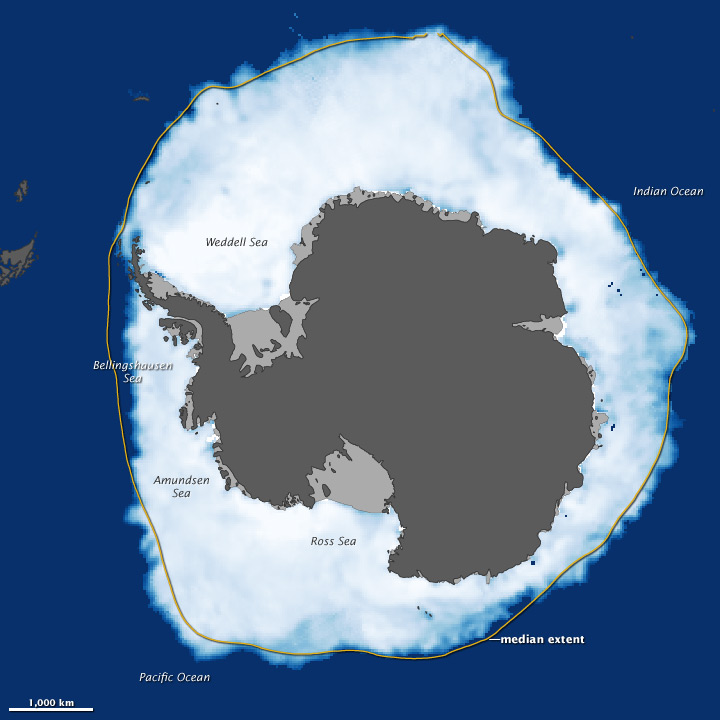
An image of Antarctica differentiating its landmass (dark grey) from its ice shelves (minimum extent, light grey, and maximum extent, white)

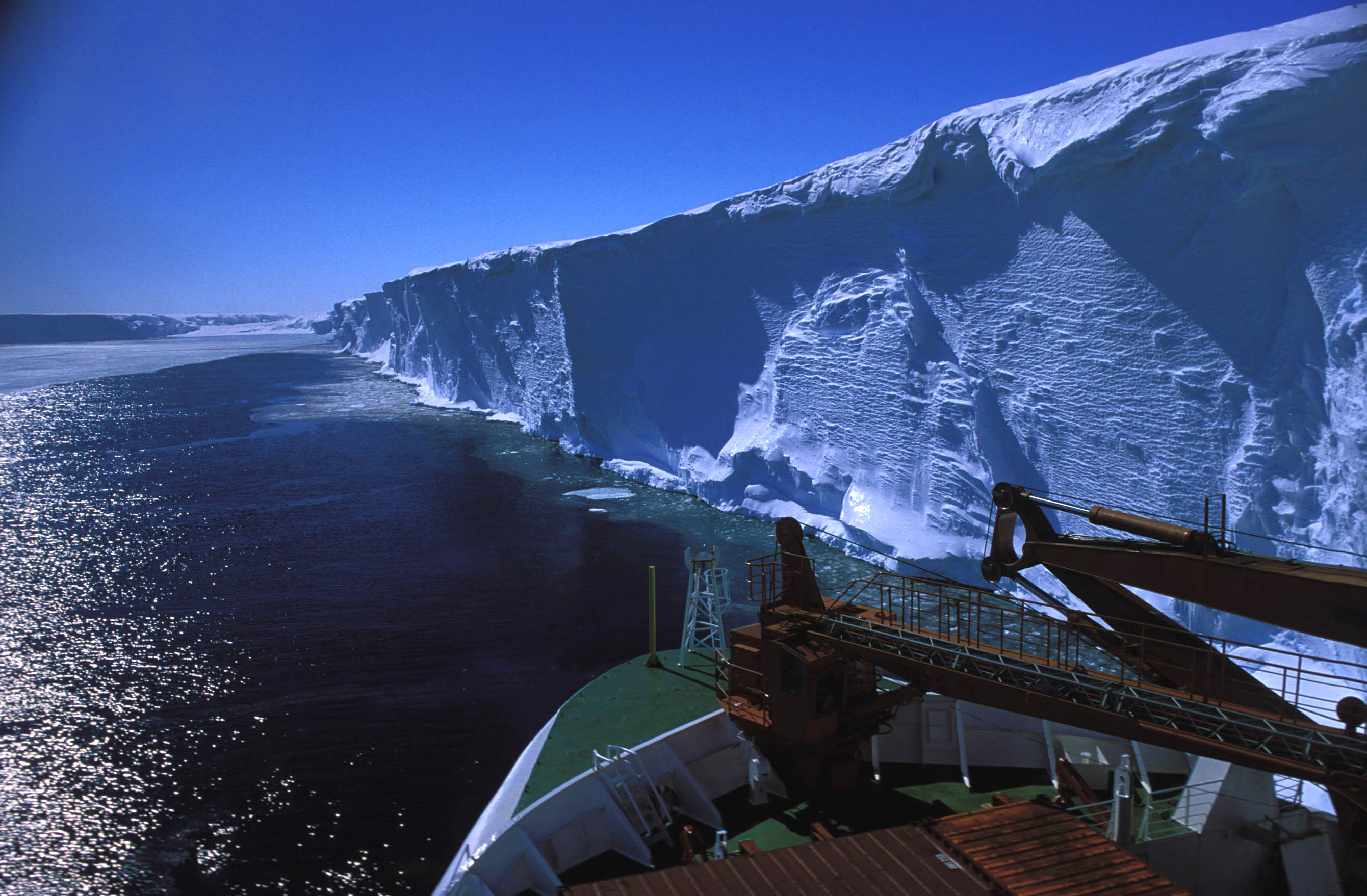
Edge of Ekstrom Ice Shelf

Ice shelves are attached to a large portion of the Antarctic coastline. Their total area is 1,541,700 km^{2}. Names are also listed in the Scientific Committee on Antarctic Research, Gazetteer. The ice shelf areas are listed below, clockwise, starting in the west of East Antarctica:

- Filchner-Ronne Ice Shelf
- Brunt Ice Shelf
- Riiser-Larsen Ice Shelf
- Quar Ice Shelf
- Ekstrom Ice Shelf
- Jelbart Ice Shelf
- Fimbul Ice Shelf
- Vigrid Ice Shelf
- Nivl Ice Shelf
- Lazarev Ice Shelf
- King Baudouin Ice Shelf
- Hannan Ice Shelf
- Zubchatyy Ice Shelf
- Wyers Ice Shelf
- Edward VIII Ice Shelf
- Amery Ice Shelf
- Publications Ice Shelf
- West Ice Shelf
- Shackleton Ice Shelf
- Totten Ice Shelf
- Moscow University Ice Shelf
- Voyeykov Ice Shelf
- Ninnis Ice Shelf
- Cook Ice Shelf
- Rennick Ice Shelf
- Slava Ice Shelf
- Gillett Ice Shelf
- Nansen Ice Sheet
- McMurdo Ice Shelf
- Ross Ice Shelf
- Swinburne Ice Shelf
- Sulzberger Ice Shelf
- Nickerson Ice Shelf
- Getz Ice Shelf
- Dotson Ice Shelf
- Crosson Ice Shelf
- Thwaites Ice Shelf
- Cosgrove Ice Shelf
- Abbot Ice Shelf
- Venable Ice Shelf
- Stange Ice Shelf
- Bach Ice Shelf
- George VI Ice Shelf
- Wilkins Ice Shelf
- Wordie Ice Shelf ^{†}
- Jones Ice Shelf ^{†}
- Müller Ice Shelf ^{†}
- Prince Gustav Ice Shelf ^{†}
- Larsen Ice Shelf ^{†} ^{(Larsen A)}
- Ronne Ice Shelf

^{†} Indicates that the ice shelf has collapsed.

== See also ==
- List of Antarctic ice streams
- List of glaciers in the Antarctic
- Retreat of glaciers since 1850
