= Neumayer (disambiguation) =

Neumayer s a German surname.

Neumayer may also refer to:

- 9351 Neumayer, minor planet
- Cape Neumayer
- Mount Neumayer
- Neumayer Channel, in the Palmer Archipelago
- Neumayer Cliffs
- Neumayer (crater), an impact crater on the Moon
- Neumayer Glacier, which flows west of the South Georgia territory
- Neumayer Station, an Antarctic research base
  - Neumayer Station II
  - Neumayer Station III
