= Unneruskollen Island =

Island in Antarctica

Coordinates: 70°30′S 6°10′W

Unneruskollen Island is an ice-covered island lying north of Halvfarryggen Ridge and between Ekstrom Ice Shelf and Jelbart Ice Shelf, on the coast of Queen Maud Land. First mapped by the Norwegian-British-Swedish Antarctic Expedition (NBSAE) (1949-1952), led by John Schjelderup Giæver, it was named Unneruskollen by the Norwegian Antarctic Expedition, 1956–60.

== See also ==
- List of antarctic and sub-antarctic islands
