= Paul Niemeyer =

Paul Niemeyer may refer to:

- Paul Niemeyer (doctor) (1832–1890), German physician
- Paul V. Niemeyer (born 1941), federal judge on the United States Court of Appeals for the Fourth Circuit
- Paul E. Niemeyer, American illustrator, graphic designer, and sculptor

== See also ==
- Niemeyer
