= Neumayer =

Neumayer is a German surname. Notable people with the surname include:

- Astrid Neumayer, Austrian equestrian
- Eric Neumayer (born 1970), German economist
- Federico Neumayer, Argentine swimmer
- Fritz Neumayer (1884–1973), German politician
- Hans Neumayer, German cyclist
- Georg von Neumayer (1826–1909), German polar explorer
- Laure Neumayer, French political scientist
- Lukas Neumayer (born 2002), Austrian tennis player
- Michael Neumayer (born 1979), German ski jumper
- Robin Neumayer, American mathematician
- Roman Neumayer (died 2015), Austrian and German ice hockey executive

== See also ==
- Neumeier
- Niemeyer, a surname
