= Niemeyer =

Niemeyer, Niemeier, or Niemeijer is a Germanic surname. Notable people with the surname include:

- Anna Maria Niemeyer (1929–2012), Brazilian architect, furniture designer, daughter of Oscar
- August Hermann Niemeyer (1754–1828), German Protestant theologian and poet
- Brian Niemeier, American science fiction horror author
- Carol A. Niemeier (born 1934), American politician
- Deb Niemeier, American civil engineer
- Felix von Niemeyer (1820–1871), German physician
- Frédéric Niemeyer (born 1976), Canadian tennis player
- Hans-Volker Niemeier, German mathematician
- Hermann Niemeyer Fernández (1918-1991), Chilean biochemist
- Isidora Niemeyer (born 2001), Chilean rower
- Jan Wolter Niemeijer (1870–1937), Dutch member of parliament
- Jo Niemeyer (born 1946), German artist and designer
- Jule Niemeier (born 1999), German tennis player
- Katherine A. Niemeyer (1925–1987), American dietitian, disability rights activist
- Maren Niemeyer (born 1964), German journalist
- Meindert Niemeijer (1902–1987), Dutch chess problemist
- Mitchell Niemeyer (born 1988), Dutch DJ and house music Producer
- Oscar Niemeyer (1907–2012), Brazilian architect
- Otto Niemeyer (1883–1971), English financial official and creator of the "Niemeyer statement"
- Paul Niemeyer (doctor) (1832–1890), German physician
- Paul V. Niemeyer (born 1941), American federal appellate judge
- Peter Niemeyer (born 1983), German football player
- Reuven Niemeijer (born 1995), Dutch footballer
- Wolf-Dietrich Niemeier (1947–2026), German archaeologist
- Wolfgang Niemeier (born 1949), German scholar of geodesy

== See also ==
- Niemeyer (tobacco), Dutch tobacco company
- 9246 Niemeyer, main-belt asteroid named after Oscar Niemeyer
- Niemeyer-Dolan technique, in lithography
- Neumayer
