= Søråsen Ridge =

Mountain in Antarctica

Coordinates: 71°25′S 10°0′W

Søråsen Ridge (Norwegian: Søråsen) is a broad, snow-covered ridge that separates the Quar and Ekström Ice shelves, on the coast of Queen Maud Land. The feature was first mapped and named Søråsen (the south ridge) by the Norwegian-British-Swedish Antarctic Expedition, 1949–52.
