= Voyeykov Ice Shelf =

Ice shelf in Antarctica

Voyeykov Ice Shelf (66°20′S 124°38′E), is an ice shelf fringing the coast between Paulding Bay and Cape Goodenough, Antarctica. Mapped by the Soviet Antarctic Expedition (SovAE) (1958) and named after Aleksandr I. Voyeykov (1842–1916), a Russian climatologist.

== See also ==
- Ice shelves of Antarctica
