= Glaciologist Bay =

Bay in Queen Maud Land, Antarctica

Glaciologist Bay (71°14′S 5°30′W) is an ice-filled bay about 25 nautical miles (46 km) long in the southwest part of the Jelbart Ice Shelf along the coast of Queen Maud Land, Antarctica. It was mapped by Norwegian cartographers from surveys and air photos by Norwegian–British–Swedish Antarctic Expedition (1949–52) and named "Glasiologbukta" (the glaciologist bay).
