= Ross Ice Shelf =

Ice shelf in Antarctica

- Ice shelf
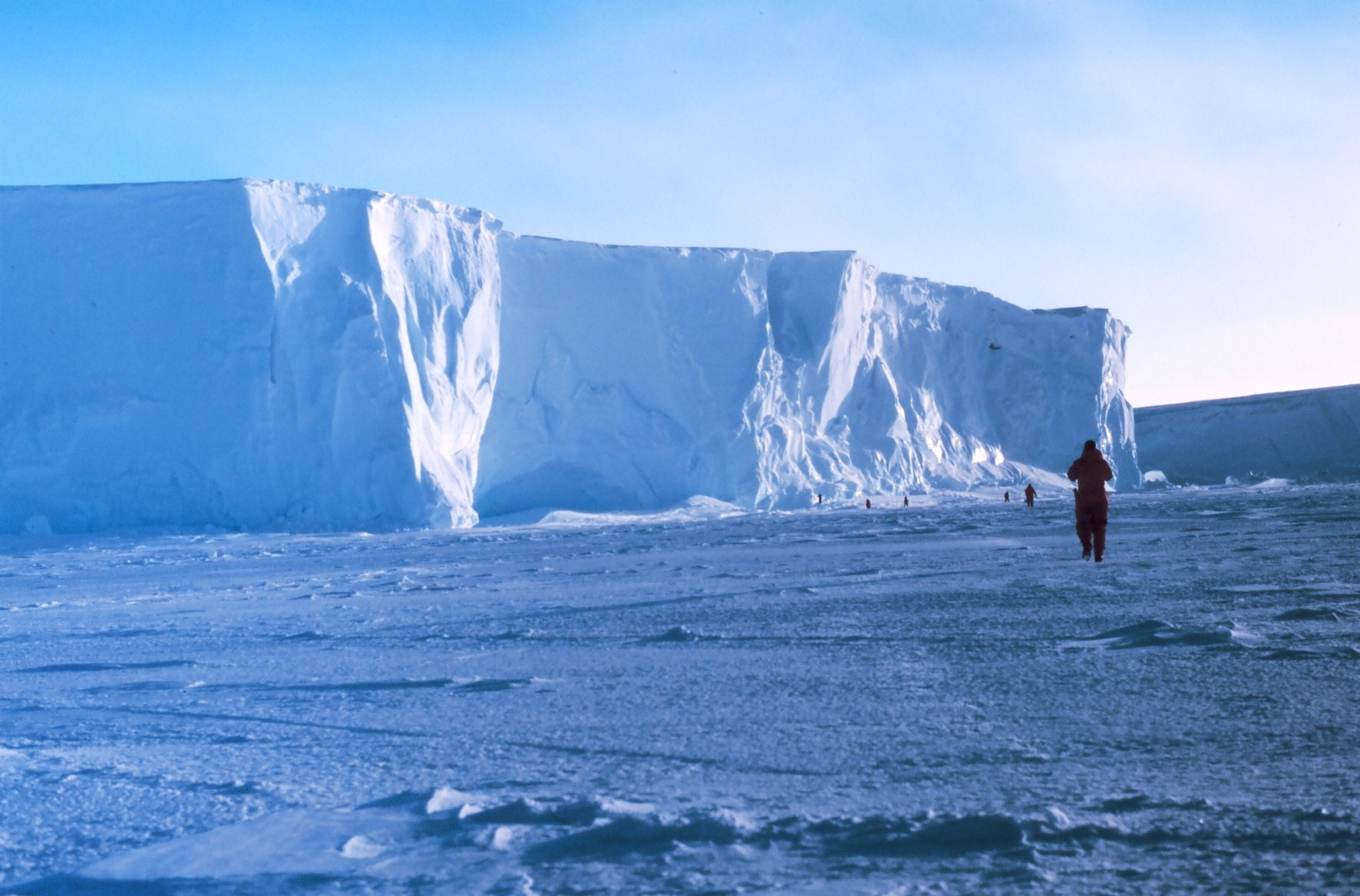
- Ross Ice Shelf cliff at the Bay of Whales, 1998
- Interactive map of Ross Ice Shelf
- Coordinates: 81°30′S 175°00′W
- Location: Antarctica
- Water bodies: Ross Sea
- Etymology: Sir James Clark Ross, who discovered it on 28 January 1841

Area
  - Total: 500,809 km^{2} (193,363 mi^{2})

Dimensions
  - Width: 800 km (500 mi)
- Elevation: 15 to 50 m (50 to 160 ft)

The Ross Ice Shelf is the largest ice shelf of Antarctica (as of 2013, an area of roughly 500,809 km^{2} (193,363 mi^{2}) and about 800 km (500 mi) across: about the size of France). It is several hundred metres thick. The nearly vertical ice front to the open sea is more than 600 km (370 mi) long, and between 15 and 50 m (50 and 160 ft) high above the water surface. Ninety percent of the floating ice, however, is below the water surface.

Most of the Ross Ice Shelf is in the Ross Dependency claimed by New Zealand. It floats in, and covers, a large southern portion of the Ross Sea and the entirety of Roosevelt Island located in the east of the Ross Sea.

The ice shelf is named after Sir James Clark Ross, who discovered it on 28 January 1841. It was originally called "The Barrier", with various adjectives including "Great Ice Barrier", as it prevented sailing further south. Ross mapped the ice front eastward to 160° W. In 1947, the U.S. Board on Geographic Names applied the name "Ross Shelf Ice" to this feature and published it in the original U.S. Antarctic Gazetteer. In January 1953, the name was changed to "Ross Ice Shelf"; that name was published in 1956.

== Exploration ==
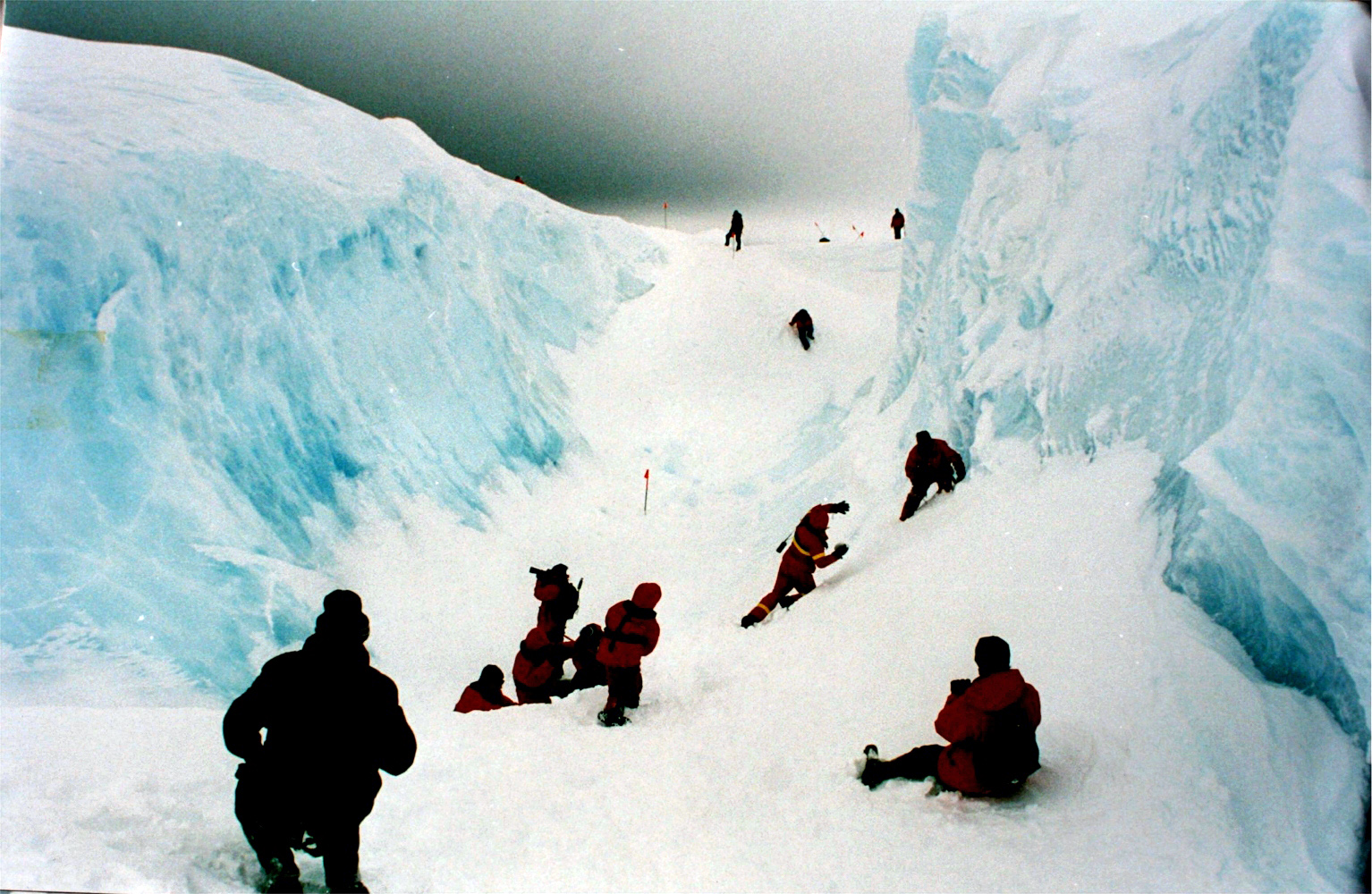
Crevasse, Ross Ice Shelf in 2001

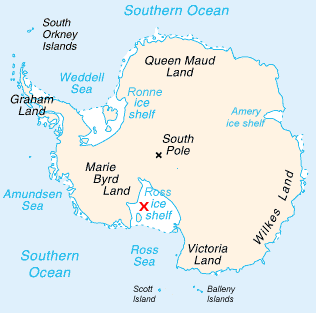
Ross Ice Shelf situated between Marie Byrd Land and Victoria Land

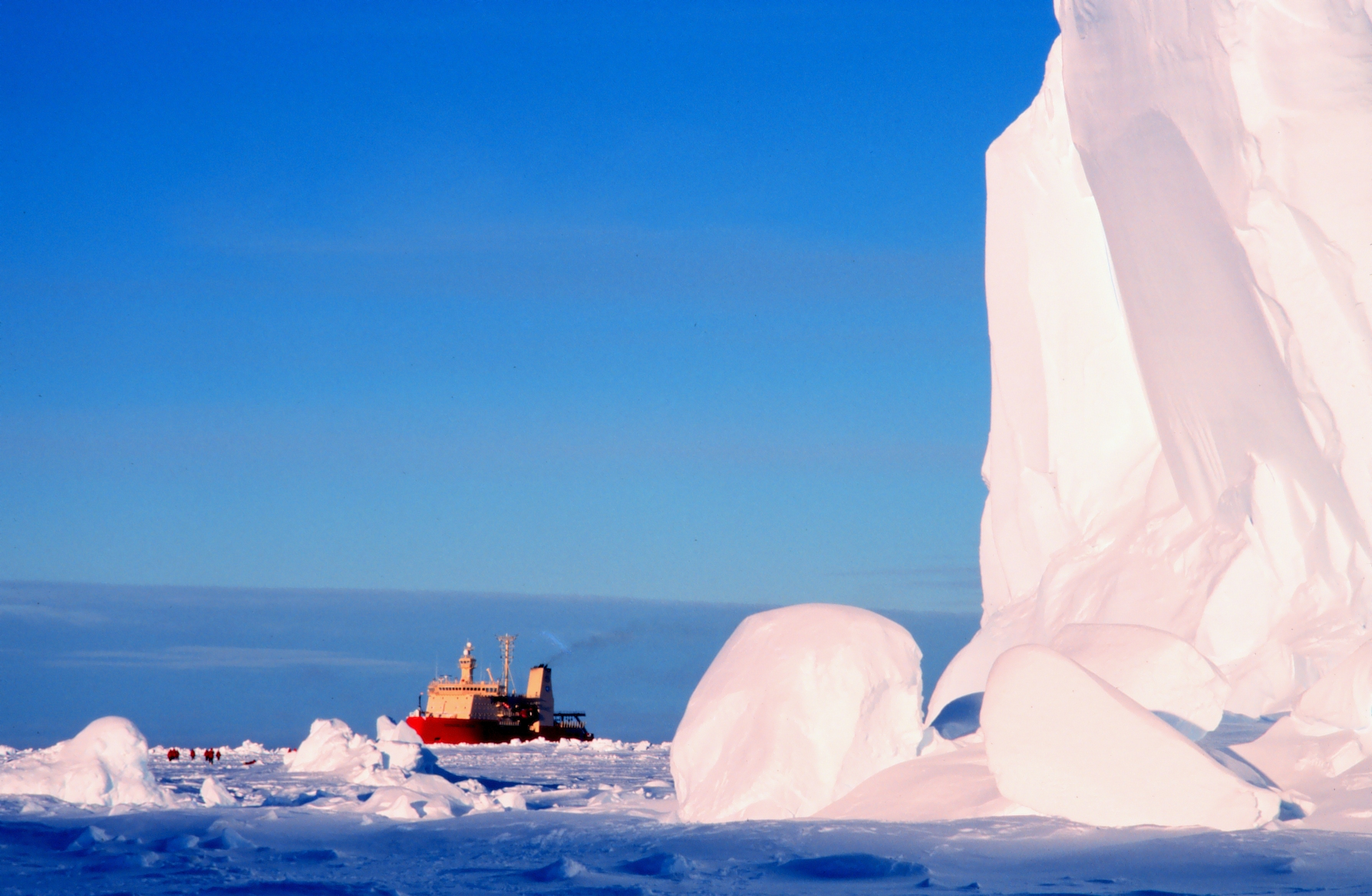
"The mystic Barrier" at Bay of Whales, near where Amundsen first encountered it. Note humans for size comparison (dark spots at left between large chunks of sea ice, near the left image border). RV Nathaniel B. Palmer is in the distance.

On 5 January 1841, the British Admiralty's Ross expedition in the Erebus and the Terror, three-masted ships with specially strengthened wooden hulls, was going through the pack ice of the Pacific near Antarctica in an attempt to determine the position of the South Magnetic Pole. Four days later, they found their way into open water and were hoping that they would have a clear passage to their destination. But on 11 January, the men were faced with an enormous mass of ice.

Sir James Clark Ross, the expedition's commander, remarked: "It was an obstruction of such character as to leave no doubt upon my mind as to our future proceedings, for we might with equal chance of success try to sail through the cliffs of Dover". Ross, who in 1831 had located the North Magnetic Pole, spent the next two years vainly searching for a sea passage to the South Pole; later, his name was given to the ice shelf and the sea surrounding it. Two volcanoes in the region were named by Ross for his vessels.

For later Antarctic explorers seeking to reach the South Pole, the Ross Ice Shelf became a starting area. In a first exploration of the area by the Discovery Expedition in 1901–1904, Robert Falcon Scott made a significant study of the shelf and its surroundings from his expedition's base on Ross Island. By measurement of calved ice bergs and their buoyancy, he estimated the ice sheet to be on average 274 m (899 ft) thick; the undisturbed morphology of the ice sheet and its inverted temperature profile led him to conclude it was floating on water; and measurements in 1902–1903 showed it had advanced 555 m (1,821 ft) northwards in 13.5 months. The findings were presented at a lecture entitled "Universitas Antarctica!" given 7 June 1911 and were published in the account of Scott's second expedition (the Terra Nova Expedition of 1910–1913).

Ernest Shackleton's southern party (Shackleton, Adams, Marshal, Wild) of the 1908 Nimrod expedition were the first humans to cross the Ice Shelf during its failed attempt to reach the South Pole. Both Roald Amundsen and Scott crossed the shelf to reach the Pole in 1911. Amundsen wrote: "Along its outer edge the Barrier shows an even, flat surface; but here, inside the bay, the conditions were entirely different. Even from the deck of the Fram we were able to observe great disturbances of the surface in every direction; huge ridges with hollows between them extended on all sides. The greatest elevation lay to the south in the form of a lofty, arched ridge, which we took to be about 500 ft (150 m) high on the horizon. But it might be assumed that this ridge continued to rise beyond the range of vision".

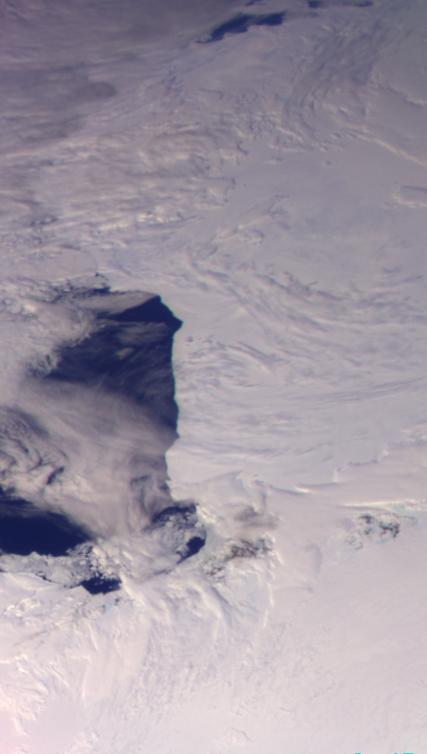
Antarctica (Ross Ice Shelf) taken from orbit by Galileo

The next day, the party made its first steps on the Barrier. "After half an hour's march we were already at the first important point—the connection between the sea-ice and the Barrier. This connection had always haunted our brains. What would it be like? A high, perpendicular face of ice, up which we should have to haul our things laboriously with the help of tackles? Or a great and dangerous fissure, which we should not be able to cross without going a long way round? We naturally expected something of the sort. This mighty and terrible monster would, of course, offer resistance in some form or other," he wrote.

"The mystic Barrier! All accounts without exception, from the days of Ross to the present time, had spoken of this remarkable natural formation with apprehensive awe. It was as though one could always read between the lines the same sentence: 'Hush, be quiet! the mystic Barrier!'

"One, two, three, and a little jump, and the Barrier was surmounted!"

== Composition and movement ==
Glacier-ice shelf interactions

Ice shelves are thick plates of ice, formed continuously by glaciers, that float atop an ocean. The shelves act as "brakes" for the glaciers. These shelves serve another important purpose—"they moderate the amount of melting that occurs on the glaciers' surfaces. Once their ice shelves are removed, the glaciers increase in speed due to meltwater percolation and/or a reduction of braking forces, and they may begin to dump more ice into the ocean than they gather as snow in their catchments. Glacier ice speed increases are already observed in Peninsula areas where ice shelves disintegrated in prior years."

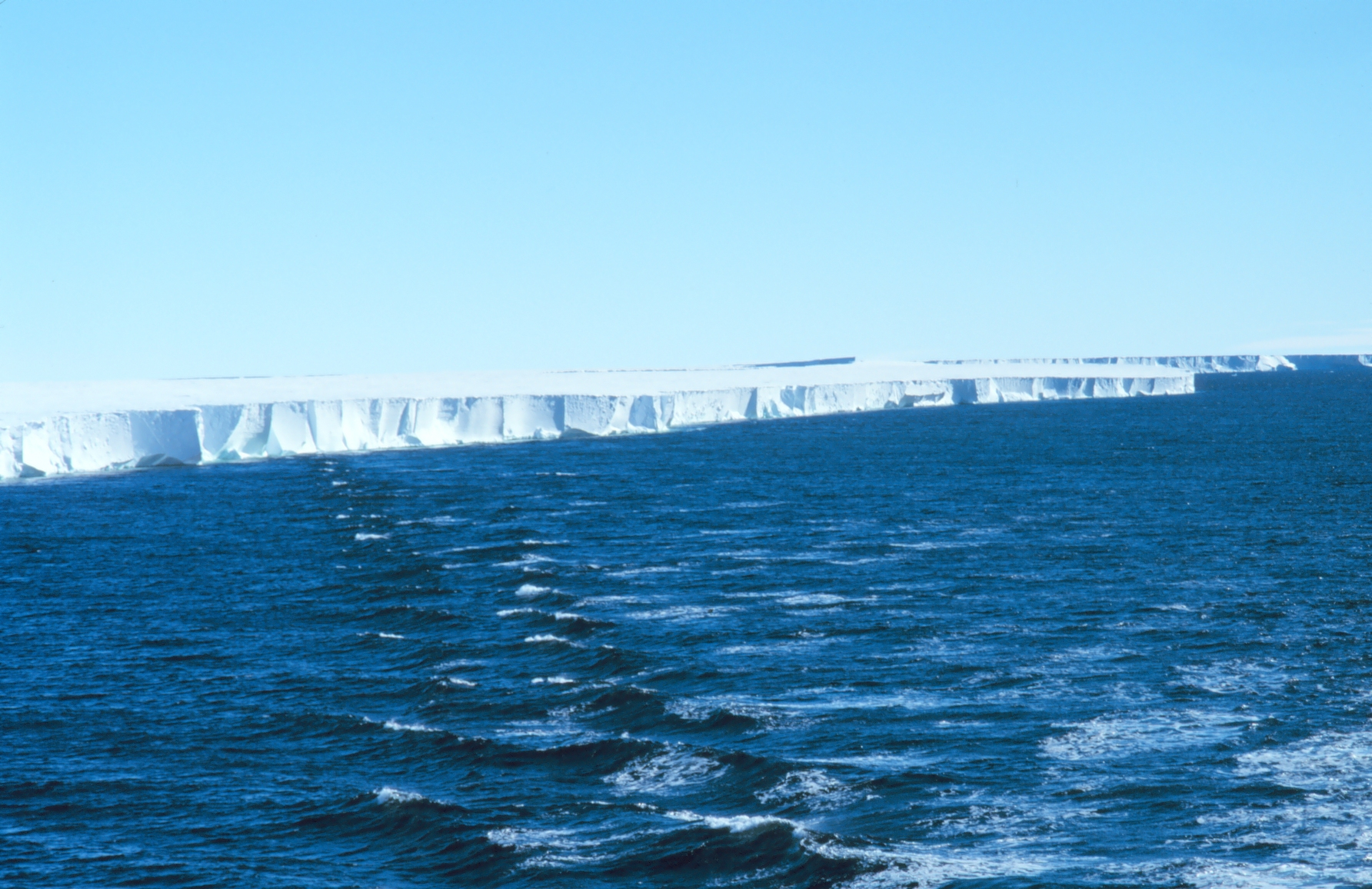
The edge of the Ross Ice Shelf in 1997

Ross ice shelf in red, other ice shelves in different colors (Filchner-Ronne Ice Shelf in blue for example)

The Ross Ice Shelf is one of many such shelves. It reaches into Antarctica from the north, and covers an area of about 520,000 km^{2} (200,000 sq mi), nearly the size of France. The ice mass is about 800 km (500 mi) wide and 970 km (600 mi) long. In some places, namely its southern areas, the ice shelf can be almost 750 m (2,460 ft) thick. The Ross Ice Shelf pushes out into the sea at between 1.5 and 3 m (5 and 10 ft) a day. Other glaciers gradually add bulk to it. At the same time, the freezing of seawater below the ice mass increases the thickness of the ice from 40 to 50 cm (16 to 20 in). Sometimes, fissures and cracks may cause part of the shelf to break off; the largest known is about 31,000 km^{2} (12,000 mi^{2}), that is, slightly larger than Belgium. Iceberg B-15, the world's largest recorded iceberg, was calved from the Ross Ice Shelf during March 2000.

Scientists have long been intrigued by the shelf and its composition. Many scientific teams researching the Antarctic have made camps on or adjacent to the Ross Ice Shelf. This includes McMurdo Station, built next to the Ross Ice Shelf on volcanic rock. One major effort was a series of studies conducted in 1957 and 1958, which were continued during the 1960–61 season. The efforts involved an international team of scientists. Some parties explored the glaciers and others the valleys on the ice shelf.

From 1967 to 1972 the Scott Polar Research Institute reported extensive observations using radio echo sounding. The technique allowed measurements to be taken from the air; allowing a criss cross track of 35,000 km (22,000 mi) to be covered; compared with a 3,000 km (1,900 mi) track from previous seismic sounding on the ground. More detailed surveys were executed between 1973 and 1978.

A significant scientific endeavor called the Ross Ice Shelf Project was launched with a plan of drilling into the shelf to sample the biomass in the area and make other determinations about the shelf and its relationship to the sea floor. This is believed to be the first oceanographic ice shelf borehole. The project included surface glaciological observations as well as drilling, and the glaciological portion started during the planning phase of the drilling. The drilling portion of the project was to have begun during 1974, but the actual drilling was delayed until 1976. Finally, in 1977, the scientists were able to drill successfully through the ice, making a hole that could be sampled every few days for three weeks. The team was able to map the sea floor, study the tides, and assess the fish and various other forms of life in the waters. The team also examined the oceanographic and geological conditions as well as the temperature of the ice. They estimated that the base of the shelf was −2.16 °C (28.11 °F). They also made other calculations about the fluctuations of the temperatures.

The results of these various projects were published in a series of reports in the 2 February 1979 issue of Science.

During the 1980s, a network of weather stations was installed to record temperatures on the shelf and throughout the more remote parts of the continent.

University of Colorado's National Snow and Ice Data Center has been studying ice shelves and, in 2002, announced that, based on several breakups of ice shelves, including Larsen B, has begun to reassess their stability. Their scientists stated that the temperature of the warmest portion of the shelf is "only a few degrees too cool in summer presently to undergo the same kind of retreat process. The Ross Ice Shelf is the main outlet for several major glaciers draining the West Antarctic Ice Sheet, which contains the equivalent of 5 m of sea level rise in its above-sea-level ice." The report added that observations of "iceberg calving" on the Ross Ice Shelf are, in their opinion, unrelated to its stability.

Scientific exploration continues to uncover interesting information and the analyses have resulted in some interesting theories being posited and publicized. One such opinion, given in 2006 based on a geological survey, suggested that the ice shelf had collapsed previously, perhaps suddenly, which could well happen again.

A science team from New Zealand installed a camp in the centre of the shelf in late 2017. The expedition was led by glaciologist Christina Hulbe and brought together oceanographers, glaciologists, biologists and sedimentologists to examine the ice, ocean and sediment in the central shelf region. One of the key findings was that the ice in the region was re-freezing. This re-freezing and growth of an ice shelf is not uncommon but the Ross Ice Shelf situation appeared to be very variable as there was no evidence of long-term freezing. A recent study attribute this variability in-part to tidal mixing.

A second New Zealand expedition in 2019 traveled to the grounding line region of the Kamb Ice Stream. The hot water drill borehole at this site penetrated through over 500 m (1,600 ft) of snow and ice to an ocean cavity only 30 m (98 ft) deep at this location. As well as sampling the ocean and sediment, it was the first deployment beneath the Ross Ice Shelf of the Remotely operated underwater vehicle Icefin developed at Georgia Tech, a vehicle designed around parameters suitable for exploration of the liquid cavities of places like Europa. The same New Zealand team returned to another site along the Kamb coast in December 2021, this time drilling through an under-ice river that proved to be essentially oceanic. The team were able to melt through the ice to discover the 250 m (820 ft) deep river had formed a relatively narrow channel beneath the ice. They also recorded evidence of the tsunami generated by the 2022 Hunga Tonga–Hunga Ha'apai eruption and tsunami.

== See also ==
- Cape Huinga
- Eady Ice Piedmont
- Howard-Williams Point
- Iceberg B-17B
- List of Antarctic ice shelves
- Nimrod Expedition
- Retreat of glaciers since 1850
- Ross Embayment
- Ross Gyre
- Steershead Crevasses
- West Antarctic Rift System
