= Clark Point =

Headland in Antarctica

Clark Point (66°33′S 123°55′E) is an ice-covered headland at the east side of the entrance to Paulding Bay. It was delineated by Gardner Dean Blodgett (1955) from aerial photographs taken by U.S. Navy Operation Highjump (1946–47), and named by the Advisory Committee on Antarctic Names for George W. Clark, Midshipman on the sloop Peacock during the United States Exploring Expedition (1838–42) under Lieutenant Charles Wilkes.
