= Dalton Iceberg Tongue =

Ice tongue in Antarctica

The Dalton Iceberg Tongue (66°15′S 121°30′E) is a large iceberg tongue that extends seaward from the eastern part of Moscow University Ice Shelf. The feature was partly delineated from air photos taken by U.S. Navy Operation Highjump (1946–47). It was mapped on the basis of observation by Phillip Law from Australian National Antarctic Research Expeditions (ANARE ) aircraft in 1958, and visited in February 1960 by the ANARE (Magga Dan) led by Phillip Law, and named by the Antarctic Names Committee of Australia for R.F.M. Dalton, second-in-command of the latter expedition.
