= Halvfarryggen Ridge =

Ridge in Antarctica

Halvfarryggen Ridge (71°10′S 6°40′W) is a broad snow-covered ridge separating the Ekström Ice Shelf and the Jelbart Ice Shelf, on the coast of Queen Maud Land, Antarctica. It was first mapped by the Norwegian–British–Swedish Antarctic Expedition, 1949–52. They referred to the feature as "Isrygg" (ice ridge), but it was subsequently named Halvfarryggen (the half way ridge) by the Sixth Norwegian Antarctic Expedition, 1956–60.
