= Moscow University Ice Shelf =

Ice shelf in Antarctica

Location in Antarctica

Moscow University Ice Shelf (67°S 121°E) is a narrow ice shelf, about 120 nautical miles (220 km) long, which fringes the Sabrina Coast of Antarctica between Totten Glacier and Paulding Bay. Dalton Iceberg Tongue extends north from the eastern part of the shelf. The feature was partly delineated from aerial photographs taken by U.S. Navy Operation Highjump in 1946–47, and further photographed and mapped by the Australian National Antarctic Research Expeditions and the Soviet Antarctic Expedition in 1958. It was named by the Soviet expedition after Moscow University.

== See also ==
- List of glaciers
- List of Antarctic ice shelves
