= Steershead Crevasses =

Crevasse field in Antarctica

Steershead Crevasses (81°10′S 164°0′W) is a large and distinctive area of crevasses 70 miles south of Roosevelt Island in the east part of Ross Ice Shelf. The outline of the crevasses resembles an immense steer's head. This is a unique landmark on the direct line of flight between McMurdo Station and Byrd Station, and U.S. Navy pilots regularly observed the "steer's head" as a means of verifying their navigation. This was noted by Kenneth Bertrand and Fred Alberts during a November 1962 flight from McMurdo to Byrd. On their recommendation, the name Steershead Crevasses was approved by the U.S. Advisory Committee on Antarctic Names.
