= Paulding Bay =

Bay in Antarctica

Coordinates: 66°35′S 123°15′E

Location of Paulding Bay in Antarctica

Paulding Bay is a bay along the coast of Antarctica just west of Clark Point. The outer portions of the bay are bounded by the Moscow University Ice Shelf and the Voyeykov Ice Shelf. It was mapped by G. D. Blodgett (1955) from aerial photographs obtained by USN Operation Highjump (1946–47), and named by the Advisory Committee on Antarctic Names (US-ACAN) for James K. Paulding, Secretary of the Navy under President Martin Van Buren. Paulding had previously served as U.S. Navy agent for New York and was instrumental in the outfitting of the United States Exploring Expedition (1838–42) under Lt. Charles Wilkes.
