= Eric Neumayer =

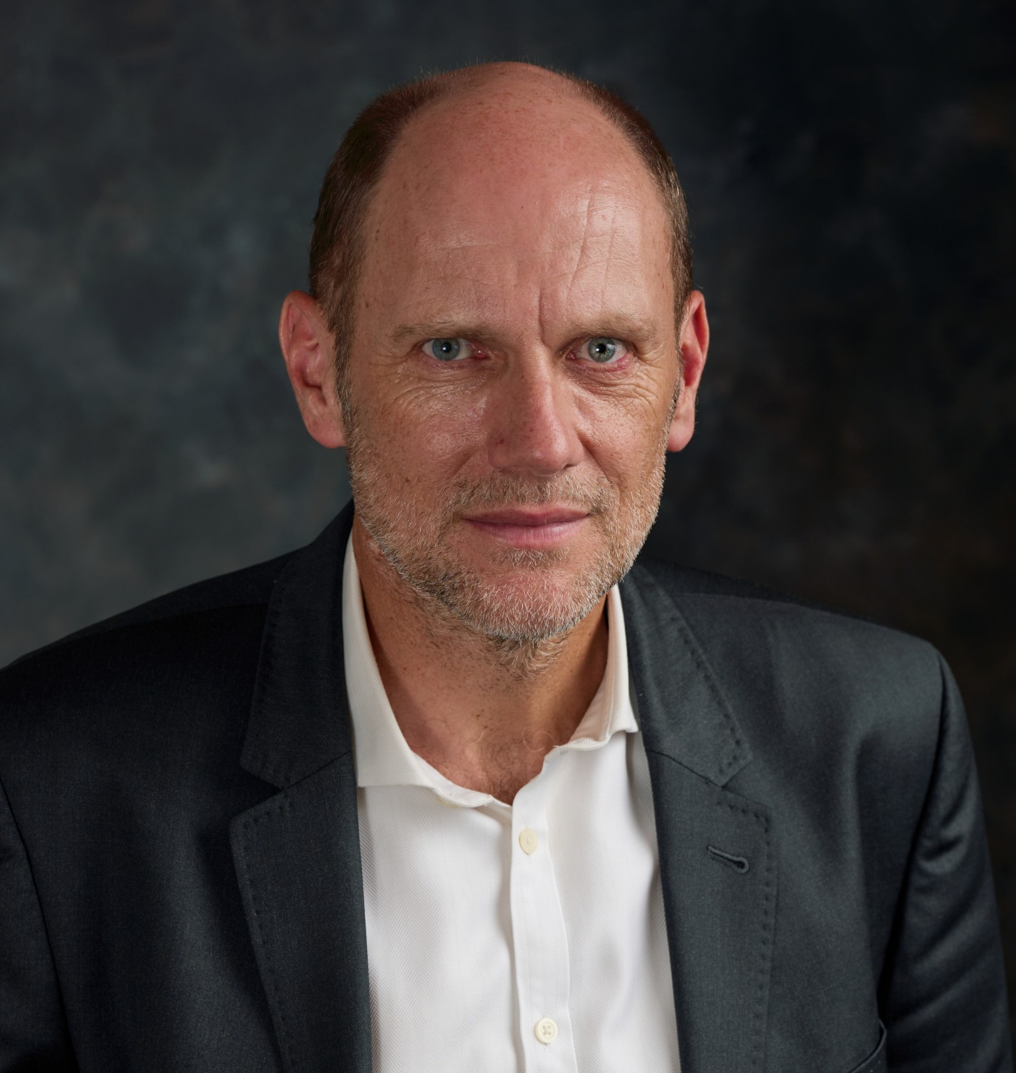
- Born: February 14, 1970 (age 56); Zweibrücken, Germany
- Education: London School of Economics and Political Science (MSc, PhD); Saarland University
- Awards: Philip Leverhulme Prize (Geography, 2003)
- Scientific career
- Fields: Geography, Political science, Environmental Economics
- Workplaces: London School of Economics and Political Science
- Website: https://www.lse.ac.uk/people/eric-neumayer

Eric Neumayer is Deputy President and Vice Chancellor of the London School of Economics and Political Science (LSE). He previously served as Interim President of LSE following the departure of Baroness Minouche Shafik, and before the appointment of the serving President and Vice Chancellor, Larry D. Kramer.

Neumayer is also the School's Vice President of Planning and Resources and a Professor of Environment and Development within the Department of Geography and Environment.

An economist by training, Neumayer's research spans multiple fields, including economic geography, sustainable development, conflict and migration, as well as quantitative research methods. He was awarded the Philip Leverhulme Prize in Geography in 2003 and received a Prize for one of seven Exemplary Political Science Articles published in the European Journal of Political Research between 1973 and 2013. He was an Associate of the Centre for the Study of Civil War at the Peace Research Institute Oslo.

== Early life and education ==
Eric Neumayer was born in Germany on 14 February 1970 and grew up in Zweibrücken. He passed the Intermediate Examination in Political Science and History at the Saarland University in Saarbrücken in March 1992.

He went on to complete a Master of Science in Development Studies at the LSE in 1994, a Master of Science in Economics at the Saarland University in 1995, and a PhD from the Development Studies Institute at the LSE in 1999.

He was awarded scholarships from the German Academic Exchange Service (DAAD) (1993-1994) and the German National Scholarship Foundation (Studienstiftung des Deutschen Volkes) (1990-1995).

== Academic Career ==
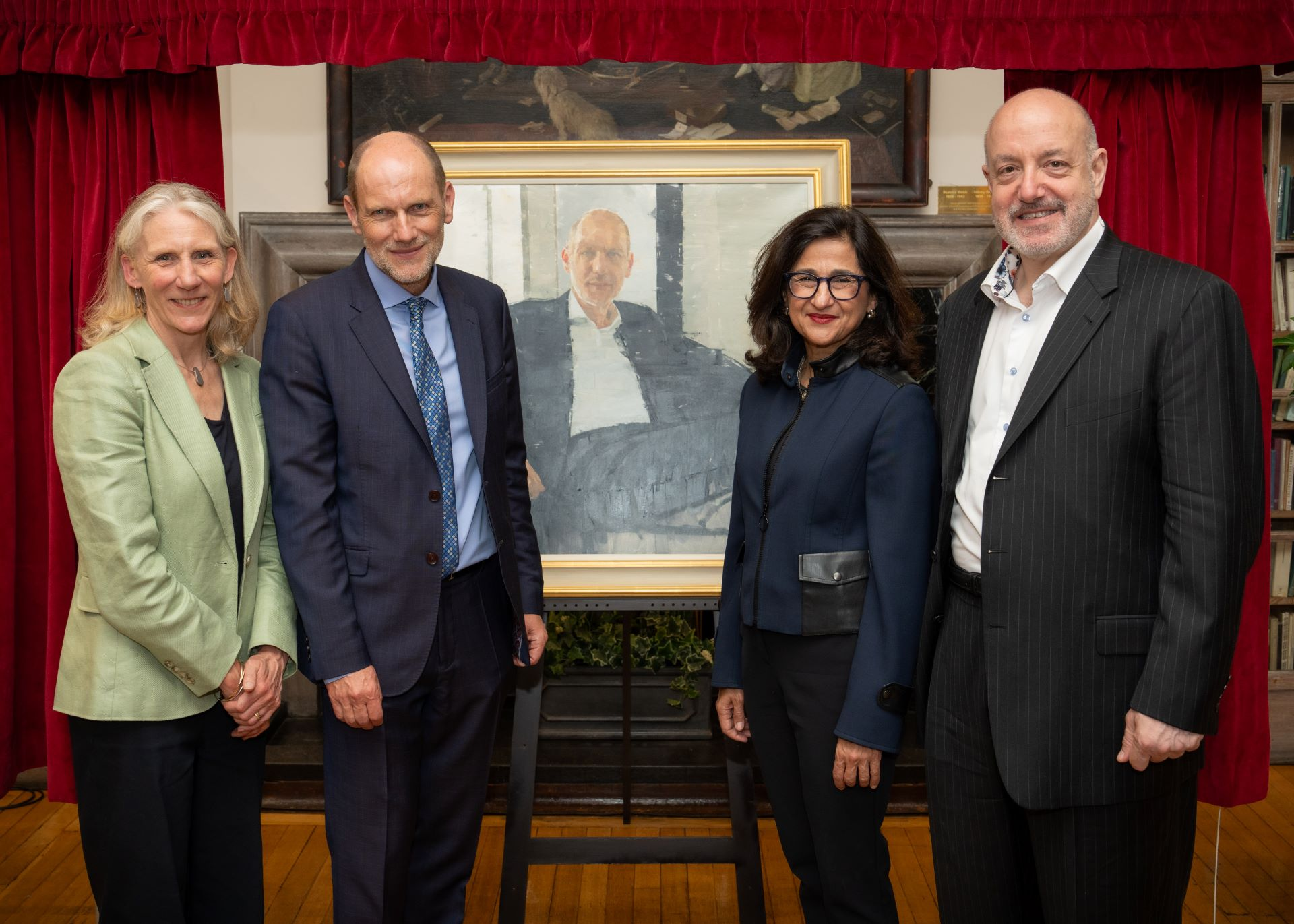
LSE Presidents Julia Black (2016-17), Eric Neumayer (2023-24), Minouche Shafik (2017-23) and Larry Kramer (2024-)

Neumayer joined LSE in 1998 as a Lecturer in Environment and Development in the Department of Geography and Environment. He became Senior Lecturer in 2003, Reader in 2005 and Professor in 2006. He was also Co-Director of the LSE Summer School (2000-2009). He served as Head of the Department of Geography and Environment from 2009 to 2013 and as Vice-Chair of the Appointments Committee from 2014 to 2016.

From 2016 to 2020, he served as Pro-Director (Vice President) for Faculty Development at LSE, where he oversaw significant reforms in recruitment, promotion, pay and retention, including the introduction of three distinct career tracks for research, education and policy staff.

Since 2014, Neumayer has served on LSE's School of Management Committee (its senior executive body) and chaired or served on numerous governance committees overseeing faculty promotion and pay, student numbers and fees, and financial management.

As Interim President and Vice Chancellor of LSE (June 2023-March 2024), he served during a period in which the marking and assessment boycott was successfully resolved and a staff reward package worth more than £110 million over seven years was adopted. During his tenure, he also represented LSE on the non-executive board of the Russell Group, which represents 24 leading UK research-intensive universities.

Across his senior leadership roles, he has guided the School through significant challenges, including the Covid-19 pandemic, industrial action and campus tensions related to the Israel-Gaza conflict.

Neumayer has published approximately 130 academic works, including five research monographs, and has an h-index of above 100, according to his Google Scholar site

== Scholarship and books ==
Neumayer's research focuses on aid and development finance, sustainable development, environmental policy, asylum and migration, human rights, violence and conflict, and quantitative methods.

He is the author of six books: The Credibility Crisis in Science: Tweakers, Fraudsters, and the Manipulation of Empirical Results (with Thomas Plümper), Weak versus Strong Sustainability: Exploring the Limits of Two Opposing Paradigms (open access, 5th edition), Robustness Tests for Quantitative Research (with Thomas Plümper), and Handbook of Sustainable Development, co-edited with Giles Atkinson and Simon Dietz. The Pattern of Aid Giving: The Impact of Good Governance on Development Assistance, and Greening Trade and Investment: Environmental Protection Without Protectionism were published in 2003 and 2001 respectively.

== Selected journal publications ==
Neumayer has published prolifically in academic journals across multiple disciplines since 1999. His more recent work examines Covid-19 confinement policies, political divisions reflected in protests against lockdown measures, and the manipulation of mortality data during the pandemic. His work has been cited more than 37,400 times on Google Scholar.

- Protest against Covid-19 Containment Policies in European Countries, Journal of Peace Research, 61 (3), 2023, 398-412 (with Katharina Gabriela Pfaff and Thomas Plümper)
- Polarized Politics: Protest against COVID-19 Containment Policies in the USA, Political Science Quarterly 138 (1), 2023, 24-46 (with Thomas Plümper and Katharina Pfaff)
- Does 'Data Fudging' Explain the Autocratic Advantage? Evidence from the Gap between Official Covid-19 Mortality and Excess Mortality, Social Science & Medicine - Population Health 19, 2022, 101247 (with Thomas Plümper)
- The Impact of the Indian Ocean Tsunami on Aceh's Long-term Economic Growth, Journal of Development Economics, 141, 2019, Article 102365 (with Martin Heger)
- W, Political Science Research and Methods, 4 (1), 2016, 175-193 (with Thomas Plümper)
- The Political Economy of Natural Disaster Damage, Global Environmental Change, 24, 2014, 8-19 (with Thomas Plümper and Fabian Barthel)
- Spatial Effects in Dyadic Data, International Organization, 64 (1), 2010, 145-166 (with Thomas Plümper)
- The Gendered Nature of Natural Disasters: The Impact of Catastrophic Events on The Gender Gap in Life Expectancy, Annals of the American Association of Geographers, 97 (3), 2007, 551-566 (with Thomas Plümper)
- Unequal Access to Foreign Spaces: How States Use Visa Restrictions to Regulate Mobility in a Globalised World, Transactions of the British Institute of Geographers, 31 (1), 2006, 72-84

== Personal life ==
Neumayer holds joint German and British citizenship and is fluent in English, German and Brazilian Portuguese. His interests include hiking, swimming, football, literature, theatre, opera and stand-up comedy.
