= Paulding, Missouri =

Extinct town in Dunklin County, Missouri

Coordinates: 36°00′49″N 90°14′10″W

Paulding is an extinct town in Dunklin County, in the U.S. state of Missouri. The GNIS classifies it as a populated place.

A post office called Paulding was established in 1900, and remained in operation until 1918. The community took its name from the Paulding Stave Company.
