= Paulding (surname) =

Paulding is a surname. Notable people with the surname include:

- John Paulding, noted for his part in the capture of the spy John André
- John Paulding (sculptor) American sculptor (1883 – 1935)
- Hiram Paulding (1797–1878), rear admiral in the U.S. Navy; son of John Paulding
- James Kirke Paulding (1778–1860), novelist and U.S. Secretary of the Navy
- William Paulding, Jr. (1770–1854), U.S. Representative and Adjutant General for New York and mayor of New York
- Nathalie Paulding, theatre, film, and television actress
- Rickey Paulding, professional basketball player
- Julie Paulding, English cyclist
- Steve Paulding, Welsh cyclist; husband of Julie
