= Neumayer Station II =

Neumayer Station II Neumayer-Station II
- Antarctic research station
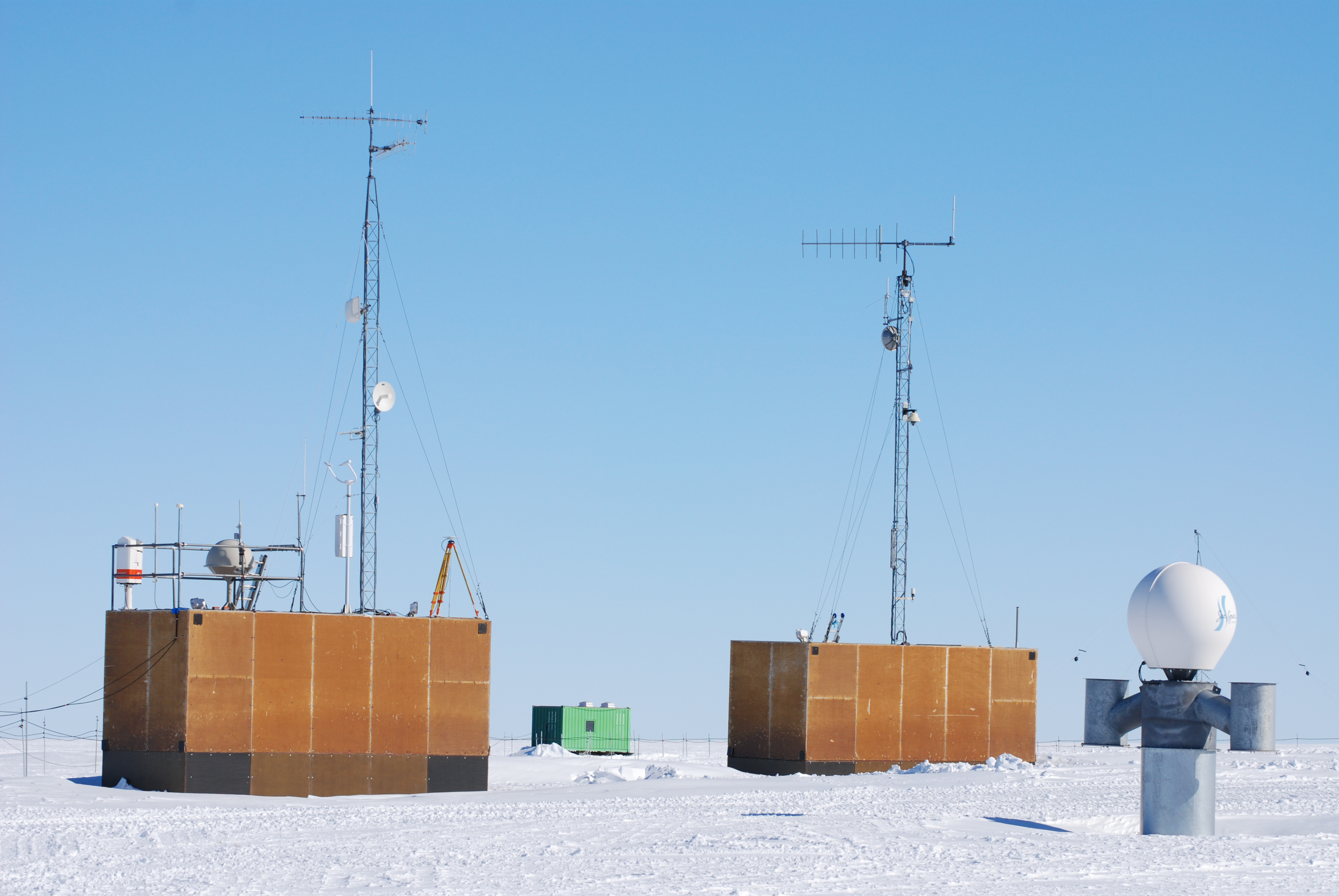
- The station in 2008

- Location in Antarctica
- Coordinates: 70°38′24″S 8°15′43″W
- Region: Queen Maud Land
- Location: Near Atka Iceport
- Established: March 1992
- Closed: 20 February 2009
- Named for: Georg von Neumayer

Government
  - Type: Administration
  - Body: AWI, Germany
- UN/LOCODE: AQ NEU
- Active times: All year-round
- Website: awi.de

Neumayer Station or Neumayer Station II was a permanent German Antarctic research base on Atka Bay. It opened in 1992, replacing the old Georg von Neumayer Station.

The station became increasingly deformed by snow and ice movements after 2007 and was therefore uninhabitable. On February 20, 2009, it was handed over to South Africa and replaced by the new permanent research base Neumayer Station III. At the time, the station was moving with the shelf ice at about 200 meters per year towards the open sea. The South African National Antarctic Programme dismantled the station in 2009 and built a new Emergency Base (E-Base) at the same location.

Georg von Neumayer Station Georg-von-Neumayer-Station
- Antarctic research station
- Interactive map of Georg von Neumayer Station
- Coordinates: 70°36′00″S 8°22′00″W
- Region: Queen Maud Land
- Location: Near Atka Iceport
- Established: 28 January 1981
- Closed: 23 February 1993
- Named for: Georg von Neumayer

Government
  - Type: Administration
  - Body: AWI, Germany
- Active times: All year-round

== See also ==
- List of Antarctic research stations
- List of Antarctic field camps

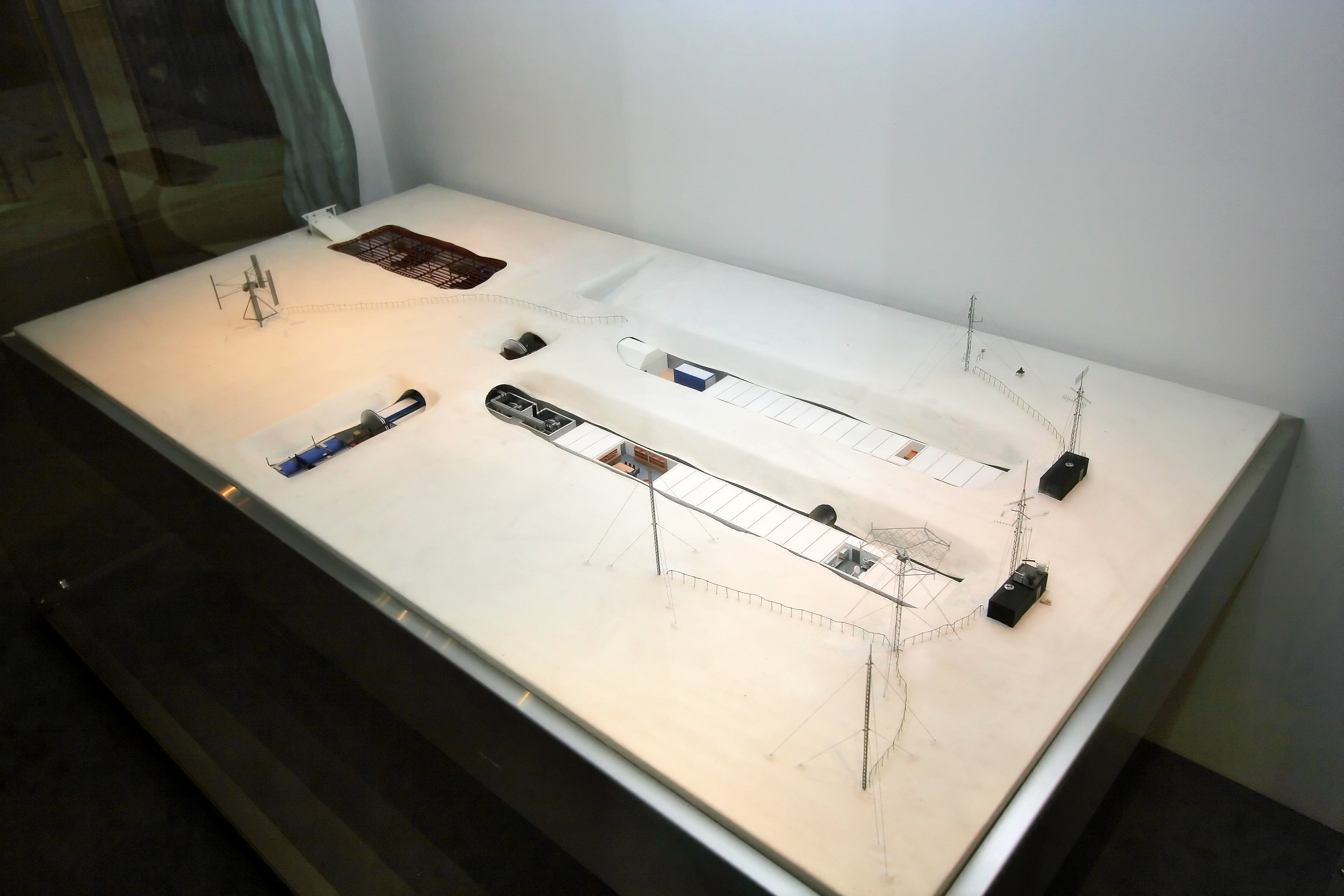
Model of the station in a museum in Bonn.
