= Georg von Neumayer =

German polar explorer and scientist (1826–1909)

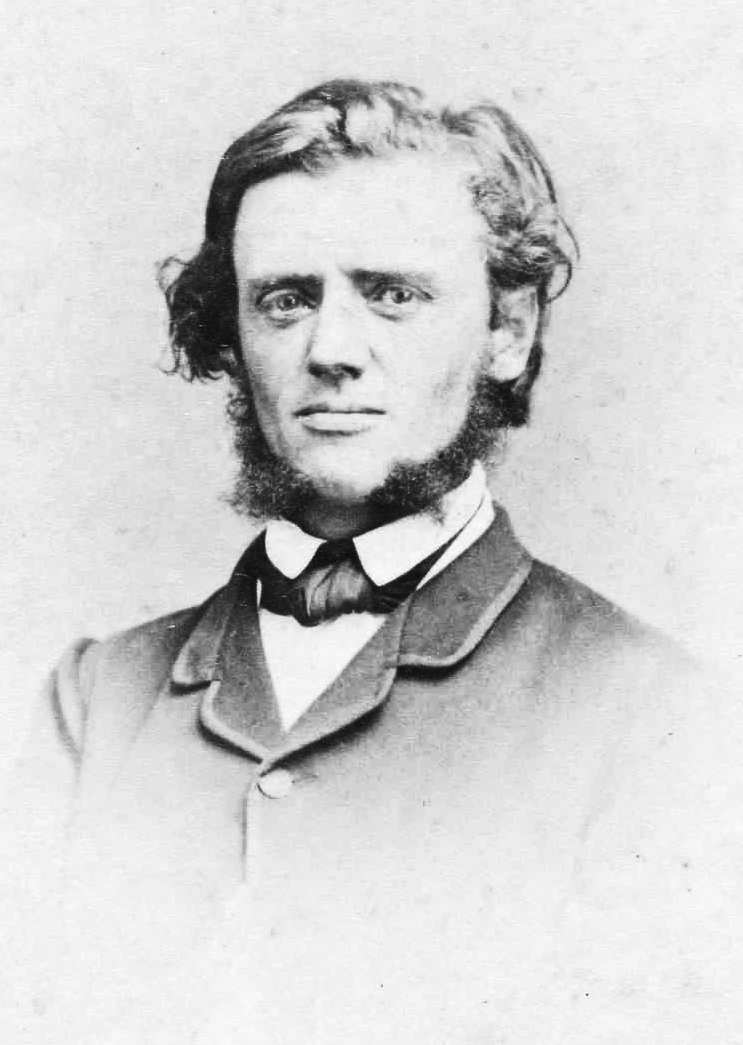
Georg von Neumayer, c. 1860

Georg Balthazar von Neumayer (21 June 1826 – 24 May 1909) was a German polar explorer and scientist who was a proponent of the idea of international cooperation for meteorology and scientific observation. He served as a hydrographer for the German Empire and was a founder of the Wilhelmshaven Observatory and the German Maritime Observatory which he directed from 1875. He was involved in establishing telegraphic networks for the sharing of meteorological data as well as promoting observatories in the Antarctic and Australia. Along with Carl Weyprecht, he was a founder of the International Polar Commission in 1879. In 1900, he was awarded the Commander's Cross of the Order of Merit of the Bavarian Crown with the associated title of Ritter von Neumayer.

== Biography ==
=== Early years ===
Born in Kirchheimbolanden, Palatinate, Neumayer was the fifth child of notary Georg and his wife Theresia, née Kirchner. He went to the Frankenthal gymnasium as well as schools in Speyer and Kaiserlautern before he went to study geophysics and hydrography at the Ludwig-Maximilians-Universität München in Munich, Bavaria in 1849.

=== Australia ===
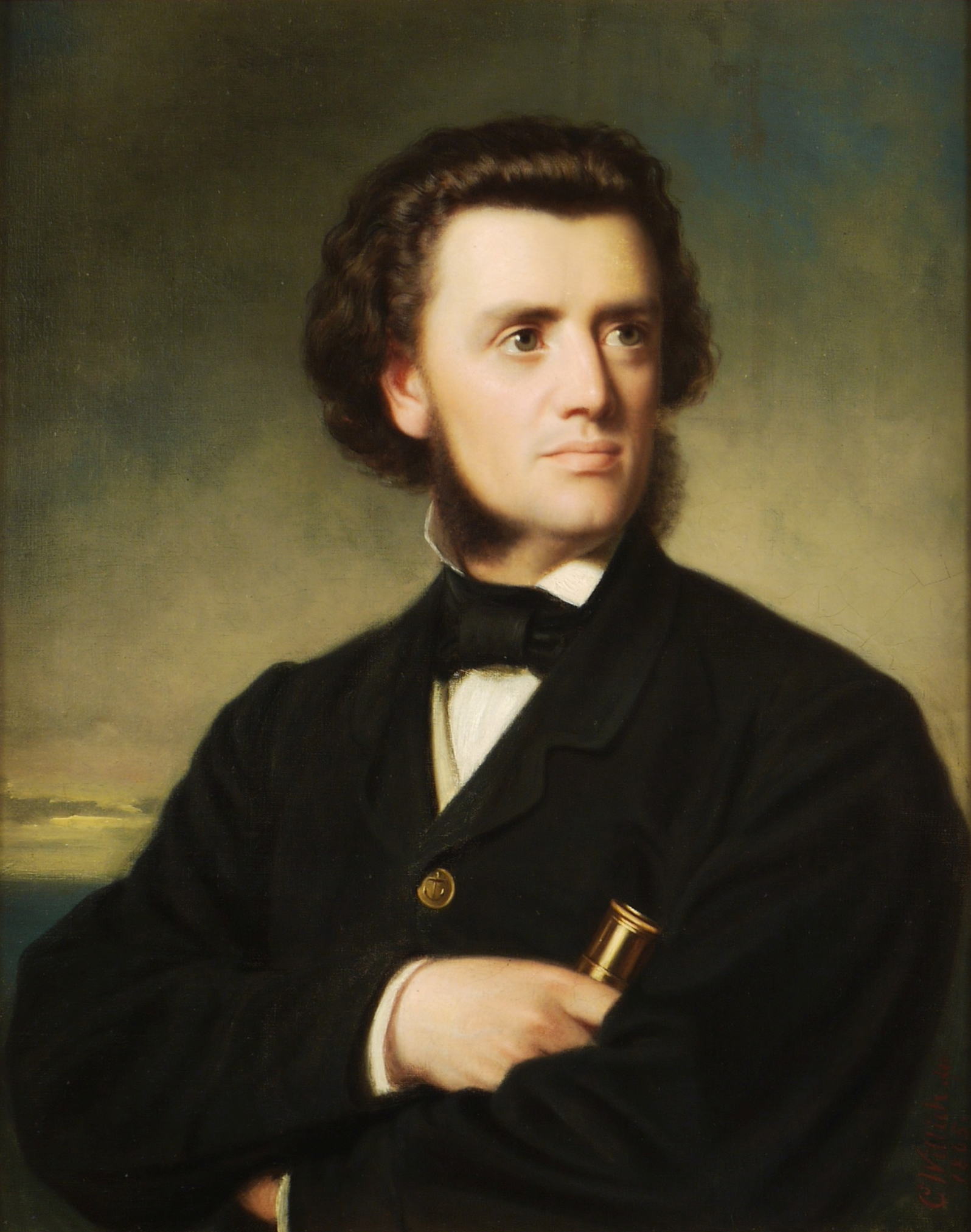
Portrait of Neumayer in 1865 by Cäsar Willich (1825-1886)

Neumayer was one of a number of influential German-speaking residents — such as Ludwig Becker, Hermann Beckler, William Blandowski, Amalie Dietrich, Wilhelm Haacke, Diedrich Henne, Gerard Krefft, Johann Luehmann, Johann Menge, Carl Mücke (a.k.a. Muecke), Ludwig Preiss, Carl Ludwig Christian Rümker (a.k.a. Ruemker), Moritz Richard Schomburgk, Richard Wolfgang Semon, Karl Theodor Staiger, George Ulrich, Eugene von Guérard, Robert von Lendenfeld, Ferdinand von Mueller, and Carl Wilhelmi — who brought their "epistemic traditions" to Australia, and not only became "deeply entangled with the Australian colonial project", but also were "intricately involved in imagining, knowing and shaping colonial Australia" (Barrett, et al., 2018, p.2).

Between 1858 and 1863, he, and a team of assistants, extracted data from hundreds of ship logbooks that was then analysed to find the best route of maximum speed and safety for sailing ships travelling between Europe and Australia. To obtain the logbooks he placed advertisements in the Victorian Government Gazette, and posted signs at the Melbourne Customs House, requesting the masters of arriving vessels to deposit their logbooks at his offices in the Flagstaff Observatory with a promise they would be returned within four days. More than 600 logs were examined and the information extracted was analysed, and the conclusions published in the second half of a book published in 1864. He was also involved in continuing studies begun earlier to drop bottles with messages to reconstruct currents based on recoveries.

Neumayer was elected a councillor of the Royal Society of Victoria in 1859, a vice-president in 1860 and a life member in 1864. He was elected to honorary membership of the Manchester Literary and Philosophical Society on 17 April 1894.

=== Burke and Wills Expedition ===
William John Wills, second-in-command of the Burke and Wills expedition succeeded J. W. Osborne as Neumayer's assistant at the Flagstaff Observatory until the expedition departed from Melbourne on 20 August 1860. Neumayer was a member of the Exploration Committee of the Royal Society of Victoria which organised the Expedition. Neumayer joined the Expedition at Swan Hill in order to conduct his magnetic observations. He remained with Burke and Wills as far as the Darling River at Bilbarka, before returning to the settled districts of Victoria.

=== Legacy ===
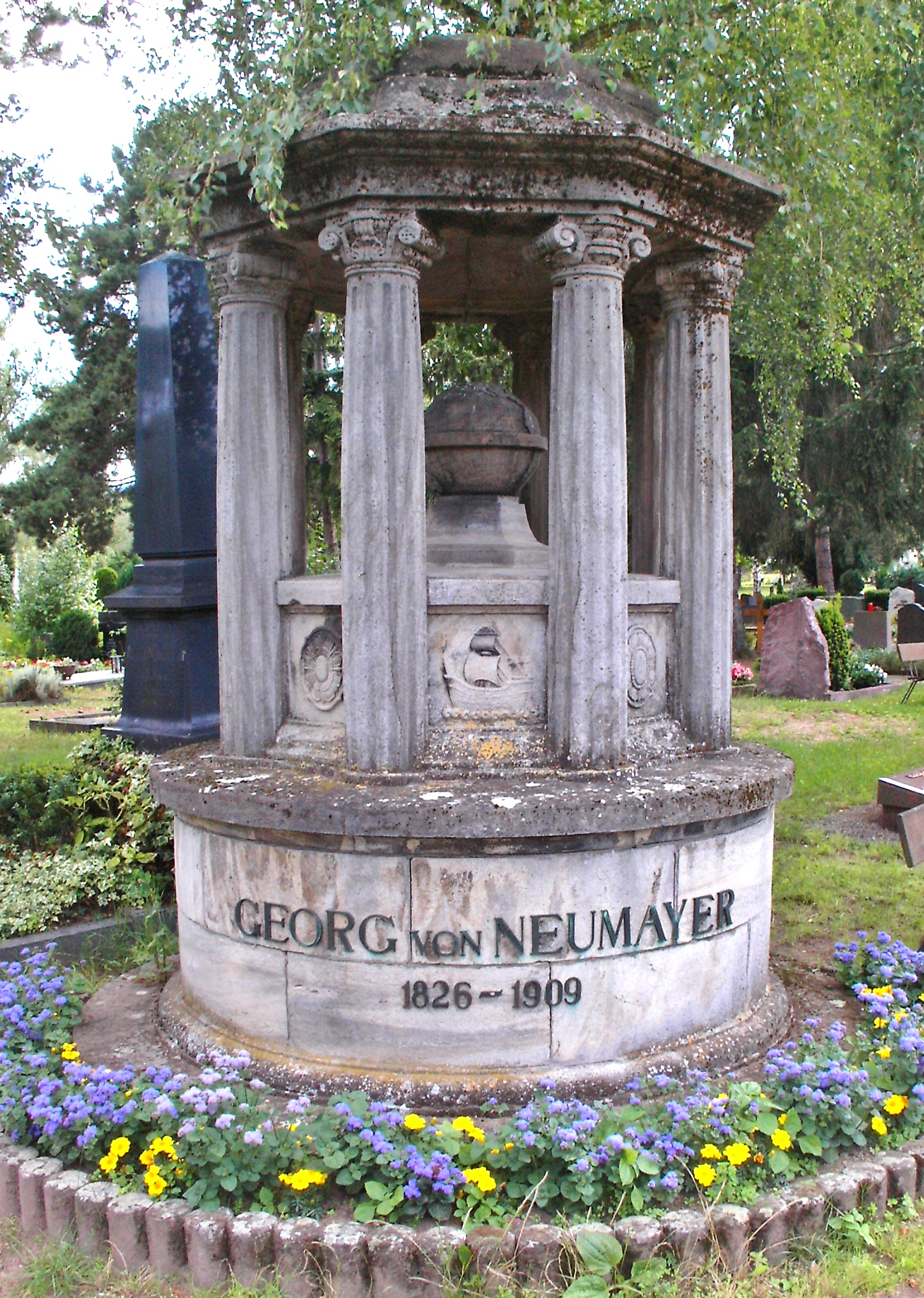
Neumayer's grave, Neustadt an der Weinstraße

Later, he organized the "Gazelle Expedition" (1874-1876), so named as it was conducted aboard the German steam frigate SMS Gazelle. He was director of the hydrographic organisation Deutsche Seewarte (1876-1903). He chaired the International Polar Commission in 1879 together with Karl Weyprecht, founding the first International Polar Year from 1882 to 1883 and the Antarctic Year 1901. In 1895, von Neumayer had established the German Commission for South Polar Exploration, which culminated in the First German Antarctica Expedition in 1901, the so-called Gauss expedition.

In 1890, he co-authored the first cloud atlas.

Polar explorer Roald Amundsen came to study under Neumayer in 1900. In the same year, Neumayer was designated a Commander of the Order of Merit of the Bavarian Crown, including the right to furthermore have his surname preceded by 'Ritter von' ('Knight of').

Neumayer died in 1909 in Neustadt an der Weinstraße. He gave his name to the German Polar Research Station in Antarctica, the now abandoned "Neumayer Station". This year-round manned station is totally covered with ice and snow (buried 10 meters under the surface) and is situated in the Weddell-Sea area (08 15W, 70 35S). The successor was the Neumayer Station II which was then abandoned itself. The only station in use now is the Neumayer Station III. Research topics are permanent observations of the Earth's magnetic field, seismological registrations, infrasonic, meteorological and air chemistry investigations.

== Bibliography ==
- Georg Neumayer, "Die internationale Polarforschung" (Berlin 1886 / 2 volumes).
- Georg Neumayer, "Auf zum Südpol" (Berlin 1901).
- Georg Neumayer, "Description and system of working of the Flagstaff Observatory". In J. Macadam (Ed.), Transactions of the Philosophical Institute of Victoria: From January to December 1858 inclusive. Vol. III. (Melbourne 1859).
- Georg Neumayer, "Results of the Magnetic Survey of the Colony of Victoria. Executed during the years 1858-1864" (Mannheim 1869).
- Edward Heis and George Neumayer, "On Meteors in the Southern Hemisphere" (Mannheim 1867).
