= Neumayer Station III =

Neumayer III Station
- Antarctic base
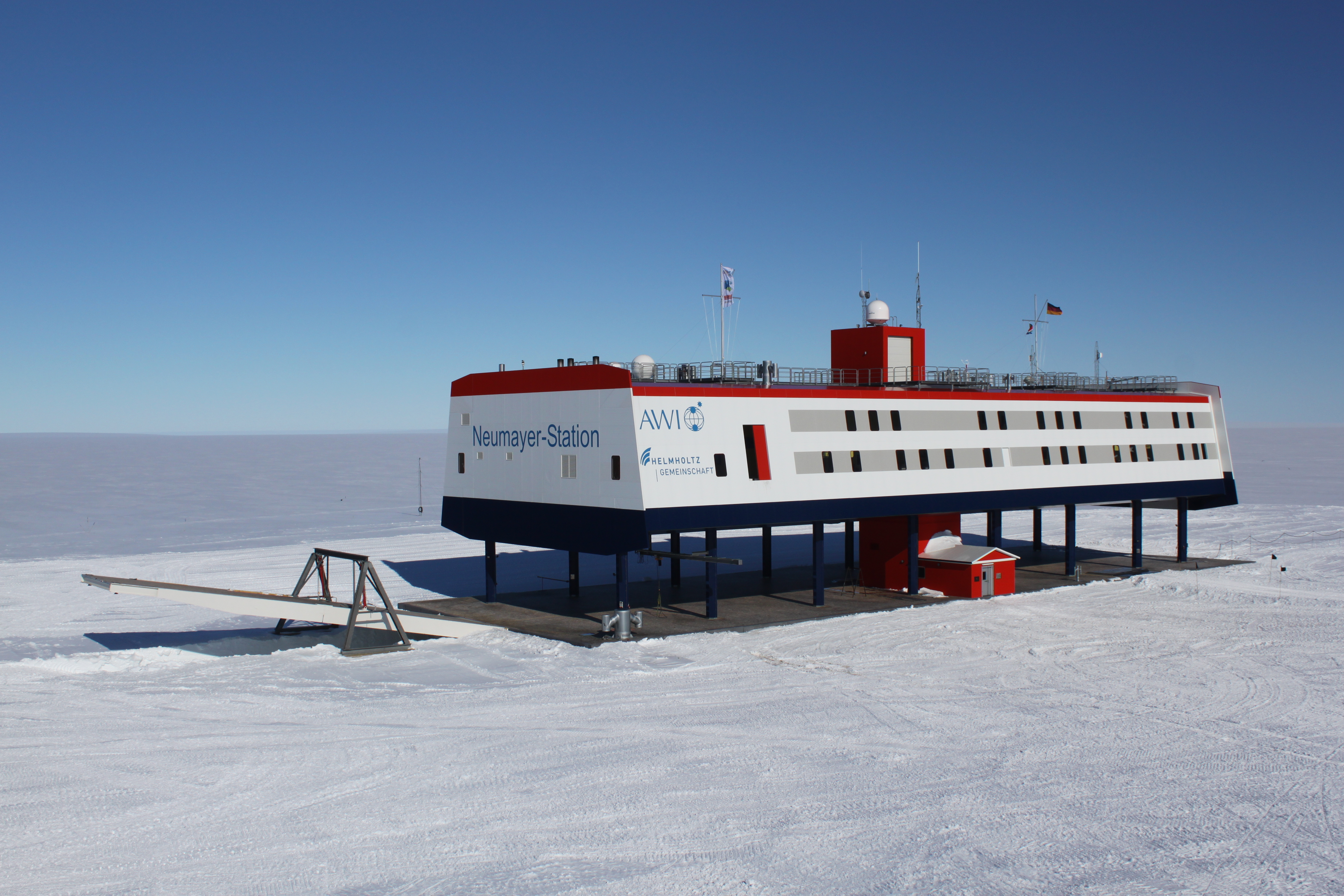
- Neumayer III Station in December 2009

- Location of Neumayer III Station in Antarctica
- Coordinates: 70°40′28″S 8°16′27″W
- Country: Germany
- Location in Antarctica: Ekström Ice Shelf; Queen Maud Land; Antarctica
- Administered by: Alfred Wegener Institute
- Established: 20 February 2009
- Named after: Georg von Neumayer
- Elevation: 43 m (141 ft)

Population (2017)
  - Summer: 60
  - Winter: 9
- UN/LOCODE: AQ NEU
- Type: All-year round
- Period: Annual
- Status: Operational
- Activities: List: Meteorology; Geophysics; Atmospheric chemistry; Infrasound
- Website: AWI

Neumayer III Skiway
- IATA: none; ICAO: AT16

Summary
- Airport type: Private
- Serves: Neumayer Station III
- Location: Ekström Ice Shelf
- Time zone: (-1)
- Elevation AMSL: 55 ft (17 m)
- Coordinates: 70°38′00″S 8°15′48″W

Map
- Location of airfield in Antarctica

Runways
Direction	Length		Surface
Direction	ft	m	Surface
	3,326	1,014	Ice

Neumayer Station III, also known as Neumayer III after geophysicist Georg von Neumayer, is a German Antarctic research station of the Alfred-Wegener-Institut (AWI). It is located on the approximately 200 metres (660 ft) thick Ekström Ice Shelf several kilometres south of Neumayer Station II. The station's assembly kit was transported to its current position early in November 2007. It is moving with the shelf ice at about 157 meters (515 ft) per year towards the open sea.

After almost ten years of work on the project, beginning in October 1999, including conception, environmental impact assessment, planning and construction phases, regular operation of the station began on 20 February 2009. The station replaced the former Neumayer Station II and the Georg von Neumayer Station that preceded it. The expected lifespan of the station is 25 to 30 years and the entire project is estimated to cost €39 million.

== Construction phase ==
The station was constructed 6 m (20 ft) above ground on a temporary two-level platform, and it now rests on 16 hydraulic columns set on a solid snow surface. A garage and further technical equipment (such as PistenBully, also referred to as caterpillar trucks, Ski-Doos, etc.) are located within a subsurface snow cavern at the front of the station. The moving concrete supporting feet are powered by hydraulic machinery. Through an annual lifting procedure of 80 to 100 cm (31 to 39 in) it is expected to prevent new snow from causing the platform to sink.

The station runs year round and includes 210 m^{2} (2,300 sq ft) of laboratory surface, divided into 12 compartments. It has twice the floor area of previous stations. Within the 15 living compartments there is room for 60 occupants to sleep. All inner rooms of the platform are built as self-contained units, some of which have aligned connecting passages, depending on their size. The compartmentalized interior of the station is enclosed in sheet metal with an interior polyurethane rigid foam insulation. The green metal girders in the "structure section" image indicate snow level; they are not part of the final structure. All items below the girders will later be embedded in the Antarctic snow.

The above-surface construction method of Neumayer III is now predominant in the Antarctic, seen at other new stations such as the American Amundsen–Scott South Pole Station and the Belgian Princess Elisabeth Base.

=== Assembly ===
A majority of the construction materials and the heavy steel frame were delivered by the end of January 2008. The plan specified that the last of the construction equipment had to leave Ekström Ice Shelf by March 2009. A crew of about 90 worked on construction. By mid-January 2009, the exterior work on the station was completed, so that further improvement to the 99 interior containers could continue unaffected by the weather.

Vehicles

Vehicles (such as snow groomers, snow mobiles, snow blowers, sledges, and a kayak) are used by researchers mainly for logistics, transport, clearing snow, raising the foundation plates, and transporting equipment. They are parked in the garage when not in use or when the station is closed. The vehicles are specially adapted to tough conditions in the snow. A tracked cherry picker and a crawler crane are used for external maintenance work on the station.

Snow groomers

The station has about 20 snowcats (some with extra passenger cabins, tillers, cranes, foldable winches, front shovels, buckets, and plow blades) in total. The snow groomers are all tracked and are mainly used by researchers for logistics supplying stations in the vicinity of researchers’ field campaigns, filling the snowmelt, clearing snow, and pulling sledges.

Snow mobiles

The station has about 10 small snowmobiles in total. The snowmobiles are tracked and are mainly used by researchers for transport, logistics, and pulling sledges.

Snow blowers

The station has 3 small, tracked, manually operated snow blowers in the station's garage. They are mainly used for raising the station's foundation plates and digging out pits. They occasionally leave the garage.

Sledges (a.k.a. sleds)

The station has about 100 sledges in total. They are mainly used by researchers as storerooms logistics containers, and for transport (pulling people on the sledge with a Ski-Doo). The sledges are also known as sleds and are pulled by a snowcat or snow mobile.

Kayak

A kayak is mainly used by researchers for transporting the multi-frequency EM equipment by attaching it to and pulling it behind a snow mobile.

Maintenance vehicles

The station has a cherry picker with caterpillar tracks and a crawler crane for external maintenance work on the station.

=== Interior ===
In addition to the previously mentioned laboratories and accommodation areas, there is a south-facing lounge with many windows, living quarters and workrooms, a laundry room containing two washing machines and two dryers, a sauna, an information technology room, shower and washrooms, a dining room with a serving window connected to the kitchen, a conference room, medical treatment rooms, operating rooms, storage rooms, a refrigerated area, a dressing room, a room for the heating system, a planning and training room, and a water-treatment room.

Garage

A garage is built beneath in the snow to park and keep the vehicles (such as snow groomers (which are also referred to as caterpillar trucks or piste bashers), snowmobiles, etc.). The voluminous garage offers plenty of room for the entire vehicle fleet to park. Two small snow blowers are stationed there for raising the station's foundation plates and digging out pits. The garage has additional utility and storage rooms that have been integrated into the interstitial deck.

A snow ramp with a hole surfaced on the ground is the main entrance and exit for vehicles using the garage. The ramp is equipped with a lid elevated up by two inverted V-shaped objects opposite of each other on the ground that tightly seals the hole when no vehicles are entering or exiting the station's garage. The hole is sealed hydraulically by two people.

Power unit

An intelligent management system is located at the front of the station. It is used by researchers for regulating the station's electrical and thermal supply.

Water supply (snowmelt)

The snowmelt which is on the ground is a key source of fresh water supply for the researchers and crew. It is filled with snow by a PistenBully snow cat, which is done twice a day and provides the station with clean drinking water. The snowmelt has a large retractable metal lid that can glide into the surface for snow to enter the hole.

Stairwell

A flight of stairs in a cabin with a door in the garage, as well as at the ground level, is for the researchers to access the building. Alongside the stairs, there is an elevator reaching all five decks of the station.

=== Data ===
- Main building height: about 29.2 m (96 ft)
- Platform surface area: about 68 m × 24 m (223 ft × 79 ft)
- Total mass: about 2,300 tonnes
- Interior floor area: 4,473 m^{2} (48,150 sq ft), on four floors
- Heated area: 1,850 m^{2} (19,900 sq ft), on three floors
- Depth under station: about 8.20 m (26.9 ft)
- Power generation:
  Three 75 kW Diesel generators – 150 kW maximum, 105 kW average output;
  One 30 kW Enercon (E-10) wind turbine generator;
  Two 20 kW uninterruptible power supplies with 20 minutes reserve
- Fuel reserves: 315,000 litres (83,000 US gal) winterized Diesel fuel for heating, power, and transportation)
- Water supply: Snow melt, using 25 kW waste heat from Diesel generators

== Remote stations ==
In order to minimize any effect that the main station's regular operations might have on the accuracy of scientific projects, small remote platforms are set up at a distance of 900 to 1,500 m (3,000 to 4,900 ft) from the main station. Magnetic, seismic, trace element, and acoustic research are the chief research missions of these remote stations.

== Later additions ==
=== EDEN ISS greenhouse ===
A separate hydroponics research module was added by 2018. Since winter 2018 it grows crops to test hydroponics etc. for use on Mars.

== Research ==
Previous Neumayer stations have been the center of continuous research since 1981, especially with respect to their observatories. In addition to the main research areas of meteorology, geophysics and atmospheric chemistry, which have been studied on the stations since the 1980s, infrasound has been studied for five years and marine acoustics since 2005.

== Climate ==
Neumayer Station experiences a dry-summer ice cap climate (Köppen EFs). In the winter, it is not shielded from the cold air masses of the interior, and as a consequence, on average the temperature drops to or below −40 °C (−40 °F) 10.3 times per year. The coldest temperature ever recorded was −50 °C (−58 °F) on July 8, 2010. It also experiences strong catabatic winds. In that moment, the temperature was −22 °C (−8 °F), decreasing the felt temperature to −47 °C (−53 °F). There are 1430 sunshine hours per year.

Climate data for Neumayer Station III (2005-2015)
Month	Jan	Feb	Mar	Apr	May	Jun	Jul	Aug	Sep	Oct	Nov	Dec	Year
Mean daily maximum °C (°F)	−1 (30)	−5 (23)	−9 (16)	−14 (7)	−15 (5)	−18 (0)	−20 (−4)	−19 (−2)	−19 (−2)	−13 (9)	−6 (21)	−2 (28)	−12 (11)
Mean daily minimum °C (°F)	−8 (18)	−13 (9)	−18 (0)	−24 (−11)	−25 (−13)	−29 (−20)	−31 (−24)	−29 (−20)	−29 (−20)	−22 (−8)	−13 (9)	−9 (16)	−21 (−5)
Average precipitation mm (inches)	17 (0.7)	18.7 (0.74)	30.1 (1.19)	34.1 (1.34)	53.6 (2.11)	35.2 (1.39)	40.9 (1.61)	32.2 (1.27)	26.8 (1.06)	47.9 (1.89)	40.1 (1.58)	18.9 (0.74)	395.5 (15.62)
Source: Time and Date

== Incidents ==
In early 2026, seven shipping containers, containing diesel fuel and other non-hazardous waste, had been placed near the edge of the ice shelf awaiting the arrival of a vessel for disposal. However, a week-long blizzard in mid-January resulted in a 500m by 300m iceberg breaking away, carrying the containers off into the Weddell Sea. Helicopters were used to retrieve some of the hazardous material, before further efforts were abandoned due to the dangers posed by disintegration of the iceberg.

== Gallery ==
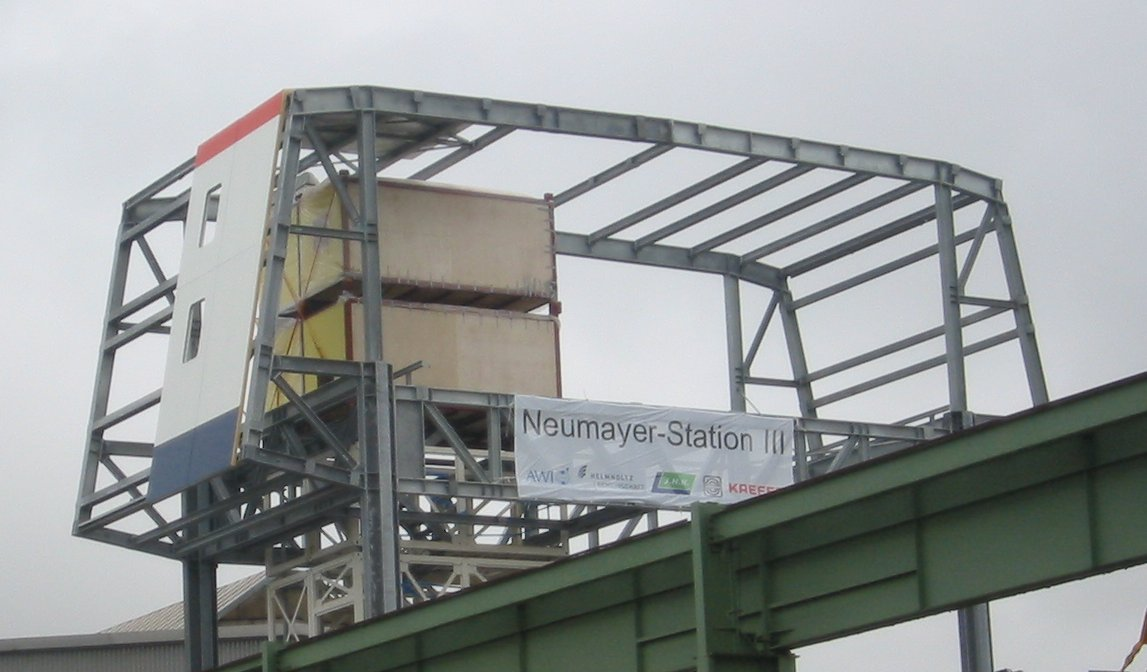
An image of a part of the station's steel structure as well as two ship containers in Bremerhaven during an open-house day

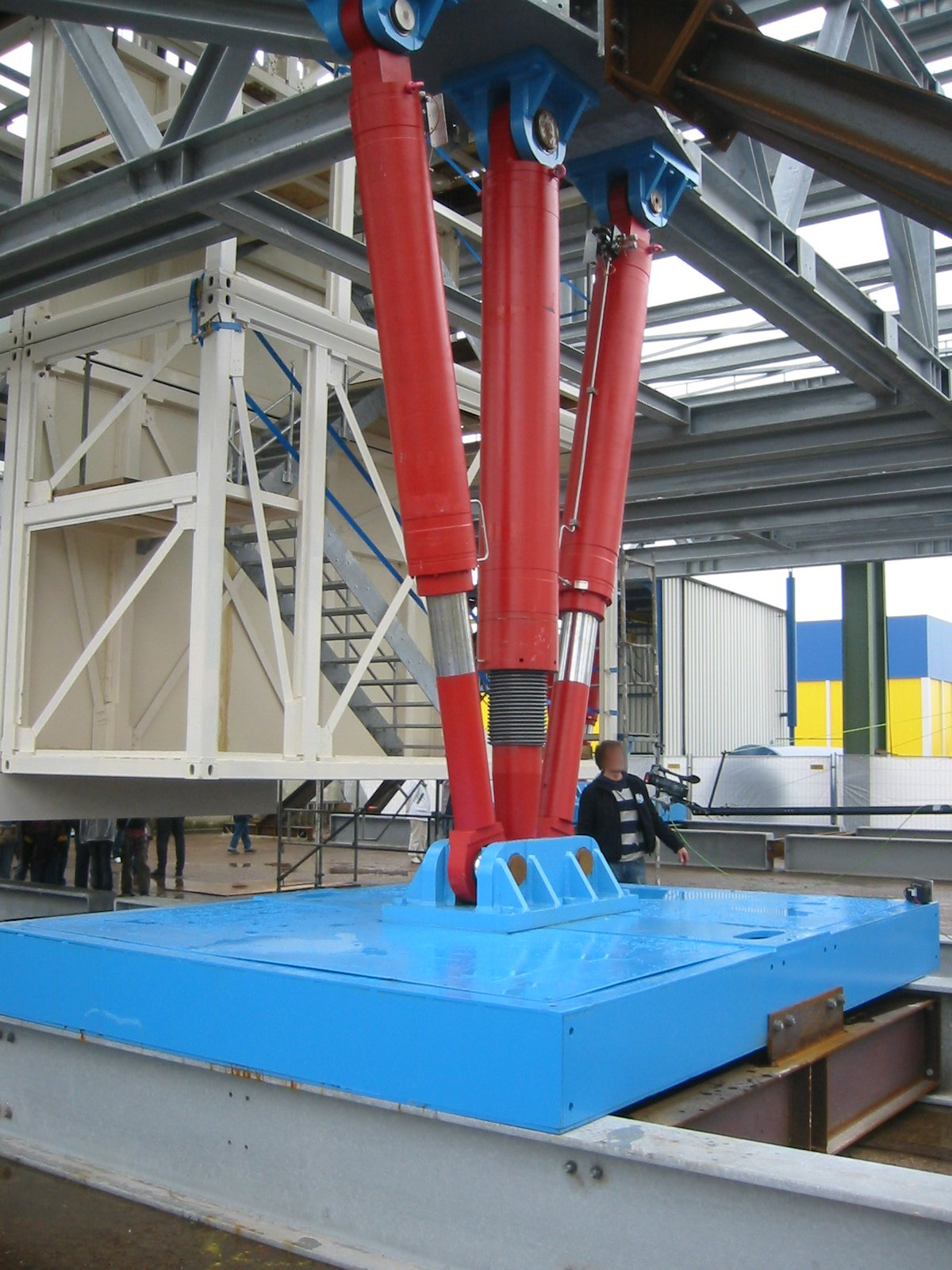
Hydraulics attached to a concrete foot

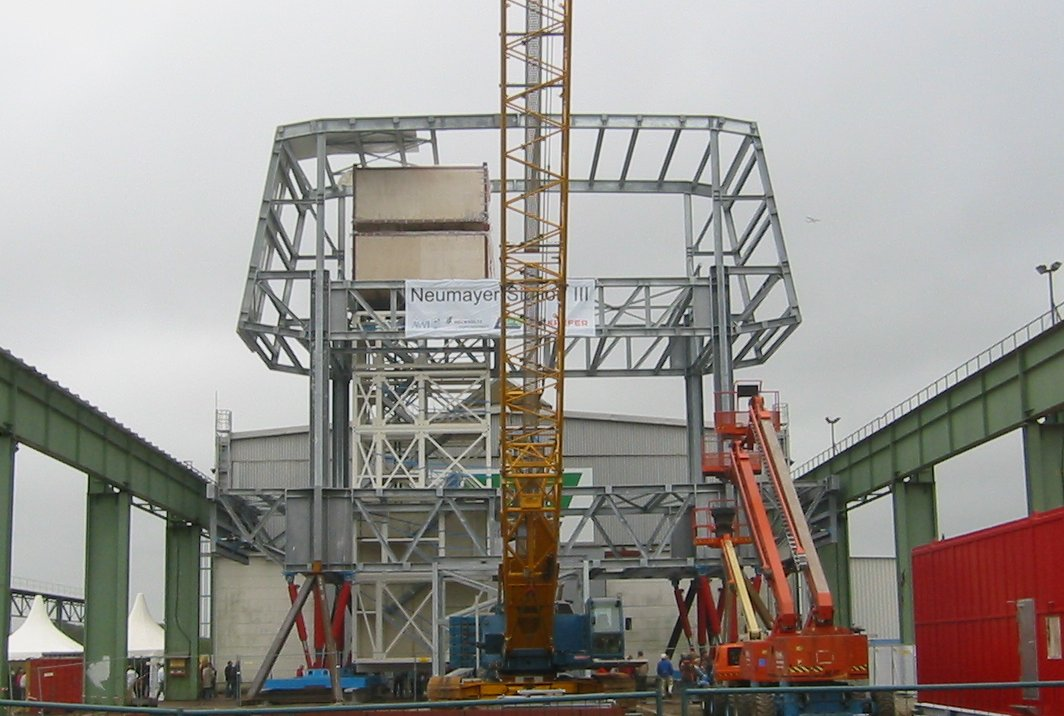
Structure section

== See also ==
- Neumayer Station II
- List of Antarctic research stations
- List of Antarctic field camps
- List of airports in Antarctica
