= Ekström Ice Shelf =

Ice shelf in Antarctica

Coordinates: 71°S 8°W

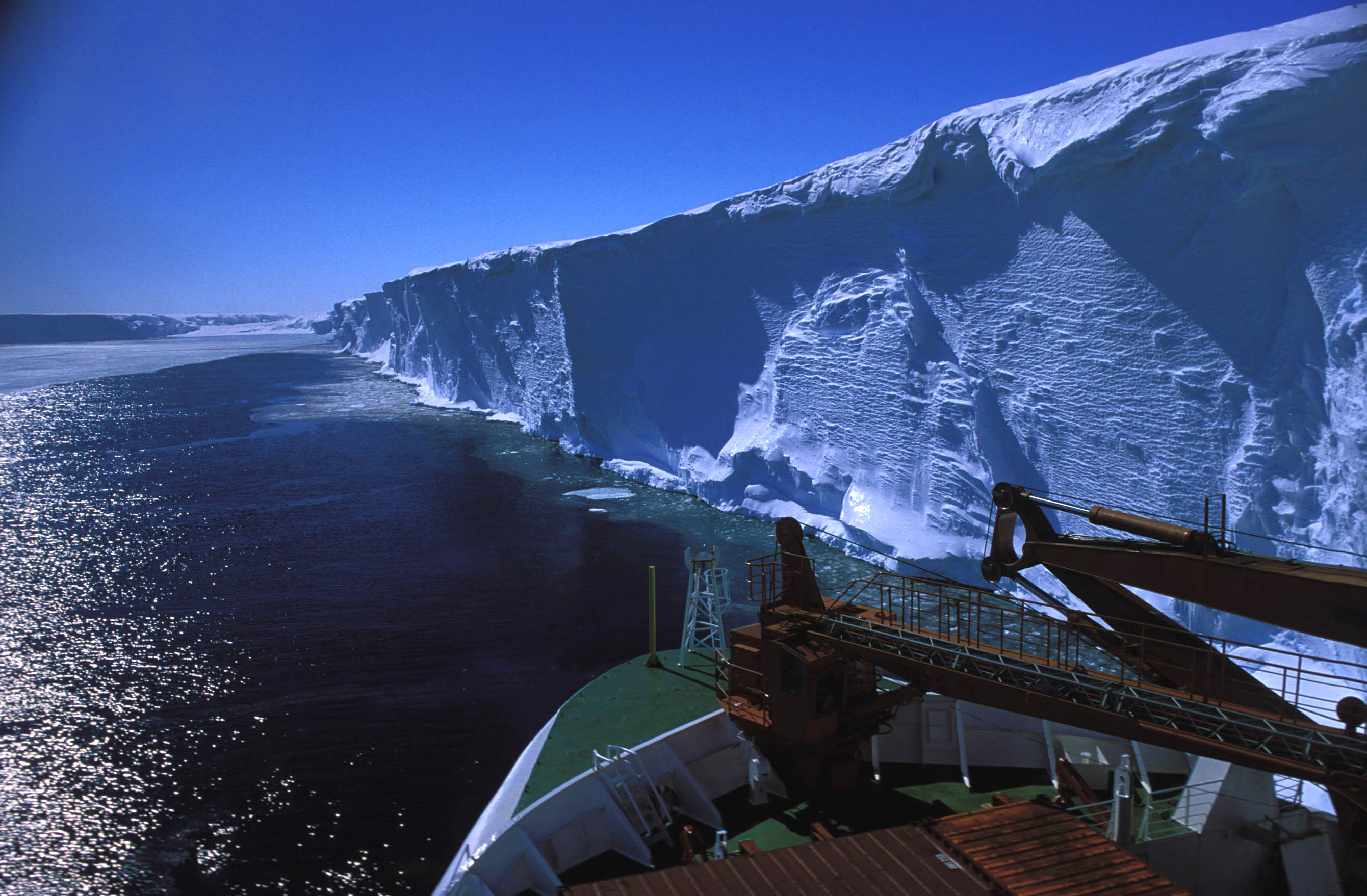
Edge of Ekström Ice Shelf

The Ekström Ice Shelf is the ice shelf lying between Sorasen Ridge and Halvfarryggen Ridge, on the Princess Martha Coast of Queen Maud Land. It was first mapped by the Norwegian–British–Swedish Antarctic Expedition (NBSAE) (1949–1952), and named for Bertil Ekström, a Swedish mechanical engineer with the NBSAE, who drowned when the weasel (track-driven vehicle) he was driving plunged over the edge of Quar Ice Shelf on February 24, 1951.

The ice shelf occupies an area of 8,700 square kilometres (3,400 sq mi). It is 160 metres (520 ft) thick at the edge, and rises 15 metres (50 ft) above the sea level. Germany's Neumayer Station III is to the northeast at Atka Bay.
