= Paulding Middle School =

Public middle school in California, United States

Location
- 600 Crown Hill Street; Arroyo Grande, San Luis Obispo County, California 93420-2869; United States; 35.126774°N 120.571187°W

Information
- School type: Regular Public Secondary
- Established: 1967
- Founder: Ruth Paulding
- Status: Currently operational
- School board: Lucia Mar Unified School District board of education
- School district: Lucia Mar Unified School District
- NCES District ID: 0623080
- NCES School ID: 062308003528
- Principal: Erika Timmer
- Teaching staff: 26.00 (on FTE basis)
- Grades: 7–8
- Gender: Co-ed
- Enrollment: 642 (see below) (2009–2010)
- Student to teacher ratio: 24.69
- Campus: Semi-rural
- Colors: Green; Gold
- Mascot: Patriot
- Newspaper: News on The Daily Bulletin (local Public-access television cable TV through Paulding only)
- Website: lmusd.org/education/components/scrapbook/default.php?sectiondetailid=9511&sc_id=1194675015

Paulding Middle School (formerly the Arroyo Grande Union High School) was originally the first high school built in the area in 1906. Decades later, the school became the lower school that fed into the new high school. Currently, the school is one of three middle schools in the Lucia Mar Unified School District teaching about 550 students in grades 7 and 8. Paulding has been designated a California Distinguished School four times.

== History ==
=== High school ===
Arroyo Grande high school students originally met for classes in the original grammar school building in town. The grammar school moved to a different location, and the high school students moved with it. Later, the students met in the Good Samaritan Hall on Branch Street while the first dedicated high school building was built. In 1907 the students were able to move into the new wooden building at the top of Crown Hill.

This was the first high school built in the area between San Luis Obispo and Santa Maria. Ten years later, the wooden building was replaced by a larger brick building. Over the next two decades, a shop building, a tennis court, and hot air heating were added. In 1939, the Works Progress Administration built the gymnasium that is still in use today.

=== Middle school ===
Several years later, the student body again outgrew the capacity of the school. A much larger high school was built to the southwest of the original campus, and it assumed the name of Arroyo Grande High School. The original school became the Ruth Paulding Junior High School that fed the new high school. In the early 1990s, the school was renamed to Ruth Paulding Middle School, though it continues to teach only grades 7 and 8.

As the function of the school changed, the school went through several name changes. These include Arroyo Grande High School, Arroyo Grande Union High School, Arroyo Grande Lower School, Crown Hill, Ruth Paulding Junior High School, and currently Ruth Paulding Middle School. Students and other locals usually refer to the school as "Paulding Middle School" or simply "Paulding".

== Curriculum ==
The curriculum requires four quarters of Advisory, Language Arts, Mathematics, Social Studies, Physical Education, Science, and grade-specific electives.

Seventh grade electives include the Wheel (a rotation of health, college and career awareness, exploring technology, and fine arts courses), math and language support, and AVID: A class for students who aspire to go to college, although their parent(s) did not, band, drama (limited entry), and guitar.

Eighth graders may choose from electives including Leadership/Government, Band (advanced or intermediate), Drama/Speech, Art, Math and Language support, AVID, Spanish, Guitar, and Yearbook/Graphic Production.

Advisory is the first period of each school day. It is taught by all teachers at Paulding, including P.E. and elective teachers, and the class prepares the students for the school day.

== Campus ==
Like the other two middle schools in the district, Paulding is built on a hill overlooking the surrounding city. The highest point on the campus is the peak of Crown Hill in the westernmost corner of the campus at about 206 feet. The lowest point is 125 feet, 81 feet lower, at the southeast corner of the athletic fields.

=== Layout ===
The Paulding campus is laid out in a semicircle. At one end are the Gym and P.E. area (numbered in the 10s) and the library media center and office area (the 20s). The rest of the campus is arranged like a wagon wheel with radiating spokes. Each of the spokes consists of a wing of the school, with the wings numbered by multiples of 10 from 30 to 70. An outer ring encloses the other spokes and is numbered in the 80s.

Four of the wings are often referred to as "teams". The 30s and 40s are eighth grade teams, and the 50s and 60s are seventh grade teams. Competition occurs between the grade-level wings.

=== Significant events ===
1906
The original wooden high school building was built atop Crown Hill to the east of the downtown village of Arroyo Grande. It was the first high school to be built between San Luis Obispo and Santa Maria.
1916
A larger brick building was constructed at the same site, replacing the earlier building.
1917–1938
A shop building, tennis court, and improved heating were added to the school.
1939
The campus gymnasium was built, which is still in use today.
2001
In August 2001, the district approved construction of a $1.9 million, 10,500-square-foot, multi-use building between the office and 30s wing. Ground was broken in 2003, and by 2005, the project was complete. Also in 2001, a new track and court complex were added to the athletic fields.
2009
At the beginning of the 2009 school year, a sidewalk was added to one side of Crown Hill enabling students to walk up and down it.
2011
Following a bat infestation inside the school's roofs in the mid-1990s and an ongoing rodent problem in the ceilings, Paulding received new roofs during the summer of 2011 paid for out of district maintenance funds.
2018
The "5-Star Students" program is adopted, allowing students to use points from their ID after it has been reached a certain quantity of scans from a staff member to earn small prizes.

== Extracurricular activities ==
=== Athletics ===
The athletic fields for the school are located 30-feet below the locker rooms across the busy East Branch Street. Students use a chain-link fenced pedestrian bridge and a steep stairway to reach the fields below. During the 2001–02 academic year, a track and more courts were added to the athletic fields. Before that, field sports were played on grassy lawns outlined with chalk.

Paulding Middle School sponsors boys and girls basketball, cross country, track and field, and boys and girls volleyball. Additionally, the soccer club plays throughout the fall with both boys and girls teams. The faculty adviser, Mr. Calderon, volunteers his time, and the club receives quite a bit of community support.

The non-profit 5 Cities Roller Kitties roller derby league holds practices and events on the Paulding basketball court.

=== Destination ImagiNation ===
The school participates in the annual Destination ImagiNation program. The February 2002 team (joint with Judkins Middle School) of Daniel Angel, Bryce Blue (Wassup Rockers), Zac Efron (High School Musical), Anthony Martin, Chris Reinacher, and Brogan Sterns won the Global Finals in the challenge "The Art of Improv, Middle Level".

In February 2011, the "Extreme Makeover, Disaster Edition" (a joint team with Arroyo Grande High School) and "The Cavorting Beasties of Cyclical Proportions" (joint with Nipomo High School) earned perfect scores in the regional competition. They, along with "Your Average Lunatics" (a third team that scored well and was exclusively from Paulding), advanced to the state finals. At state, the teams placed 6th out of 6, 2nd out of 2, and 7th out of 14 respectively in their grade levels. The 2012 competition will be held on February 27 at AGHS.

=== Homework clubs ===
Homework Clubs are voluntary (though some students are "strongly encouraged" to attend) opportunities to work on homework or a reading assignment. All of the homework clubs are open to any student who complies with the rules and would like extra help with their coursework. There are three homework clubs that meet regularly, though other teachers open their classrooms for similar help on a regular basis. Attendance records are kept of all participants.

=== School band ===
The school band performs at numerous parades and events, including:

- September: Arroyo Grande Valley Harvest Festival — an annual event since 1937
- October: Pismo Beach Clam Festival — a community tradition since 1946
- November: Pismo Beach Marching Band Review — an annual competitive parade of marching bands from around California
- December: Grover Beach Holiday Parade — an annual event since 1966
- The band often participates various "Music in the Parks" events.

Band members sell a "Green and Gold Card" with community discount offers as a fundraiser. The money raised benefits the Paulding Music Department.

=== Other clubs ===
Students may participate in several other clubs, including GATE, Homework Club, Mock Trial, Paulding Sports Association, and Robotics. There also is an ASB formed from a representative from each advisory or homeroom.

== Notable alumni ==
- Zac Efron, 2000–2002 — actor
- Thornton Lee, 1923–1925 — Major League Baseball player

== Awards, recognition, and rankings ==
- Paulding has been awarded the California Distinguished School award four times, in 1988, 1996, 2001, and 2005.
- The Education.com TestRating for Paulding is 8, which is the highest in the district (Judkins Middle School received a 7, and Mesa Middle School received a 6). Among nearby schools, only Paulding and Laguna Middle School scored 8's, while the remainder scored between a 2 and a 7.

== Statistics ==
=== Enrollment ===
The table below details enrollment figures for the past three decades.

Total enrollment	2010–11				2009–10			2008–09			2007–08		2000			1990	
Total enrollment	Students	Percent	Change (1 yr)	Change (10 yrs)	Students	Percent	Change	Students	Percent	Change	Students	Percent	Students	Percent	Change (10 yrs)	Students	Percent
Total enrollment	629	100.00	▼ -13 −2.02%	▼24 −3.68%	642	100.00	▲19 +3.05%	623	100.00	n/a	n/a	n/a	653	100.00	▲38 +6.18%	615	100.00
Enrollment by grade	2010–11				2009–10			2008–09			2007–08		2000			1990	
Enrollment by grade	Students	Percent	Change (1 yr)	Change (10 yrs)	Students	Percent	Change	Students	Percent	Change	Students	Percent	Students	Percent	Change (10 yrs)	Students	Percent
7th grade	n/a	n/a	n/a	n/a	322	50.16	▲12 +3.87%	310	49.76	n/a	n/a	n/a	325	49.77	▲17 +5.52%	308	51.25
8th grade	n/a	n/a	n/a	n/a	320	49.84	▲7 +2.24%	313	50.24	n/a	n/a	n/a	328	50.23	▲35 +11.95%	293	48.75
Enrollment by gender	2010–11				2009–10			2008–09			2007–08		2000			1990	
Enrollment by gender	Students	Percent	Change (1 yr)	Change (10 yrs)	Students	Percent	Change	Students	Percent	Change	Students	Percent	Students	Percent	Change (10 yrs)	Students	Percent
Male	n/a	n/a	n/a	n/a	342	53.27	▲18 +5.56%	324	52.01	n/a	n/a	n/a	334	51.15	n/a	n/r	n/r
Female	n/a	n/a	n/a	n/a	300	46.73	▲1 +5.56%	299	47.99	n/a	n/a	n/a	319	48.85	n/a	n/r	n/r
Enrollment by race	2010–11				2009–10			2008–09			2007–08		2000			1990	
Enrollment by race	Students	Percent	Change (1 yr)	Change (10 yrs)	Students	Percent	Change	Students	Percent	Change	Students	Percent	Students	Percent	Change (10 yrs)	Students	Percent
White	n/a	n/a	n/a	n/a	413	64.33	▼ -1 −0.24%	414	66.45	n/a	n/a	n/a	503	77.03	▲52 +11.53%	451	73.33
Hispanic	n/a	n/a	n/a	n/a	178	27.73	▲42 +30.88%	136	21.83	n/a	n/a	n/a	117	17.92	▼ -32 −21.48%	149	24.23
Asian or Pacific Islander	n/a	n/a	n/a	n/a	27	4.21	▲4 +17.39%	23	3.69	n/a	n/a	n/a	23	2.30	▲15 +187.50%	8	1.30
Two or more races	n/a	n/a	n/a	n/a	16	2.49	▼ -27 −62.79%	43	6.90	n/a	n/a	n/a	n/r	n/r	n/a	n/r	n/r
Black	n/a	n/a	n/a	n/a	4	0.62	▼ -27 −33.33%	6	0.96	n/a	n/a	n/a	4	0.61	▼ -2 −33.33%	6	0.98
American Indian/Alaska Native	n/a	n/a	n/a	n/a	3	0.47	▲2 +200.00%	1	0.16	n/a	n/a	n/a	6	0.92	▲5 +500.00%	1	0.16
Hawaiian/Pacific Islander	n/a	n/a	n/a	n/a	1	0.16	▲1 NA	0	'0	n/a	n/a	n/a	n/r	n/r	n/a	n/r	n/r
Qualify for free/reduced lunches	2010–11				2009–10			2008–09			2007–08		2000			1990	
Qualify for free/reduced lunches	Students	Percent	Change (1 yr)	Change (10 yrs)	Students	Percent	Change	Students	Percent	Change	Students	Percent	Students	Percent	Change (10 yrs)	Students	Percent
Free lunches	n/a	n/a	n/a	n/a	160	25.44	▲44 +37.93%	116	18.62	n/a	n/a	n/a	113	17.30	n/a	n/r	n/r
Reduced-price lunches	n/a	n/a	n/a	n/a	77	12.24	▲30 +63.83%	47	7.54	n/a	n/a	n/a	57	8.73	n/a	n/r	n/r

=== Faculty and staff ===
Academic year	Pupils to teachers		Teachers		Other staff	
Academic year	Ratio	Change	FTE	Change	#	Change
2010–11	24.2	▼ -0.5 −2.02%	26.0	0; 0.00%	10	n/a
2009–10	24.7	▲4.2 +20.49%	26.0	▼ -0.8 −2.99%	n/a	n/a
2008–09	20.5	n/a	26.8	n/a	n/a	n/a
2007–08	n/a	n/a	n/a	n/a	n/a	n/a
2000	22.8	▲1.6 +7.55%	28.6	▼ -0.4 −1.38%	n/a	n/a
1990	21.2	n/a	29.0	n/a	n/a	n/a

Notes:

- 2006–07 and 2007–08 data have not been added to these tables yet.
- Not all values total to 100% due to rounding, missing data, or other issues with the original data.
- "NA" indicates no change or an unusual condition, "n/a" indicates that the information is not available or not applicable, and "n/r" indicates that the information was not reported.
- Due to changes in reporting methods, if the "Hawaiian / Pacific Islander" race was reported, then "Asian / Pacific Islander" does not include those values (i.e., it was "Asian"-only in that reporting period). However, if "Hawaiian / Pacific Islander" was not reported, then "Asian / Pacific Islander" includes both races.
- For decades, the academic year of x0–x1 is used (e.g., 90–91 for 1990).
- Statistics at the source only are available from 1986–87 to 2009–10. Limited preliminary data for 2010–11 is included where possible.

== See also ==
- Lucia Mar Unified School District
- San Luis Obispo County high schools
