= Paul Niemeyer (doctor) =

- Born: 9 March 1832; Magdeburg
- Died: 24 February 1890 (aged 57); Berlin
- Occupation: Physician

Paul Niemeyer (9 March 1832 – 24 February 1890) was a German physician and hygienist, born in Magdeburg and a half brother of internist Felix von Niemeyer.

In 1849–51 he studied medicine at the University of Halle, where his influences were physiologist Alfred Wilhelm Volkmann and chemist Richard Felix Marchand. In 1854 Niemeyer received his doctorate at Berlin with the thesis De mandible ancylosi novaque ejus curatione operativa. Afterwards, he worked as an assistant at the Altstädtische Krankenhaus in Magdeburg. In 1875, he obtained his habilitation at the University of Leipzig, and later on, published and lived as a practising physician in Berlin.

In addition to purely scientific works and textbooks, such as the Handbuch der Theoretische und Klinische percussion und Auscultation (1868–71) and Medicinische Abhandlungen (three volumes, 1872–75), he published a variety of popular medical writings. In 1878 he published a German translation of Florence Nightingale's Notes on nursing : what it is, and what it is not as Rathgeber für Gesundheits- und Krankenpflege.

Niemeyer died in Berlin.

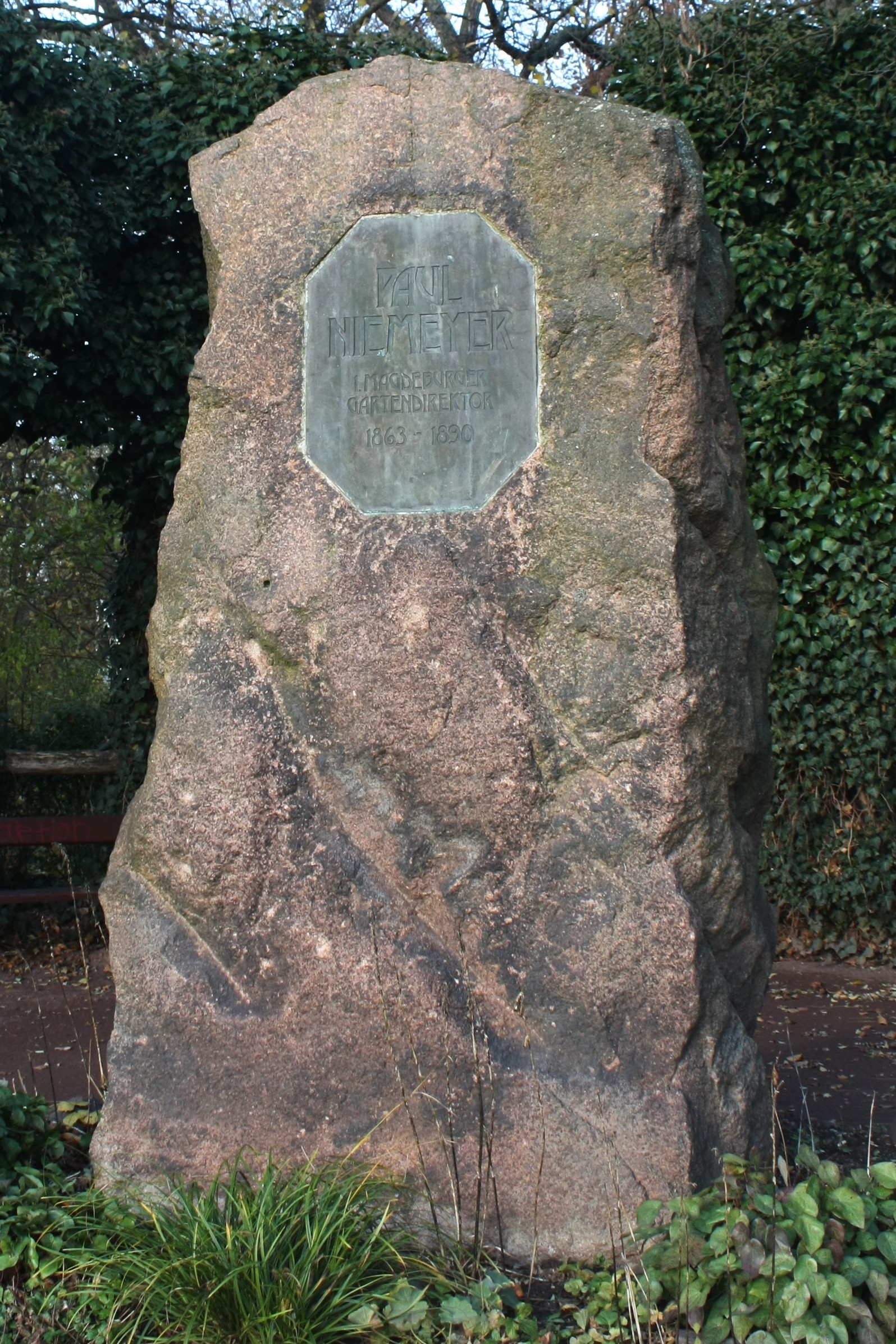
Niemyer's gravestone in Magdeburg.
