= Wyers Ice Shelf =

Ice shelf in Antarctica

Coordinates: 67°11′S 49°54′E

Wyers Ice Shelf is a small Antarctic ice shelf on the east side of the base of Sakellari Peninsula.
