= Quar Ice Shelf =

Ice shelf in Antarctica

Coordinates: 71°20′S 11°0′W

Quar Ice Shelf is the ice shelf between Cape Norvegia and Sorasen Ridge along the coast of Queen Maud Land.

== Discovery and Naming ==
It was mapped by the Norwegian-British-Swedish Antarctic Expedition (NBSAE) (1949–1952). The ice shelf was named after Leslie Quar, a British radio mechanic and electrician with NBSAE, who drowned when the weasel (track-driven vehicle) in which he was riding drove over the edge of this ice shelf on 24 February 1951.

The NBSAE established Maudheim Station about 1 mile south of Norsel Iceport.
