= Felix von Niemeyer =

German internist

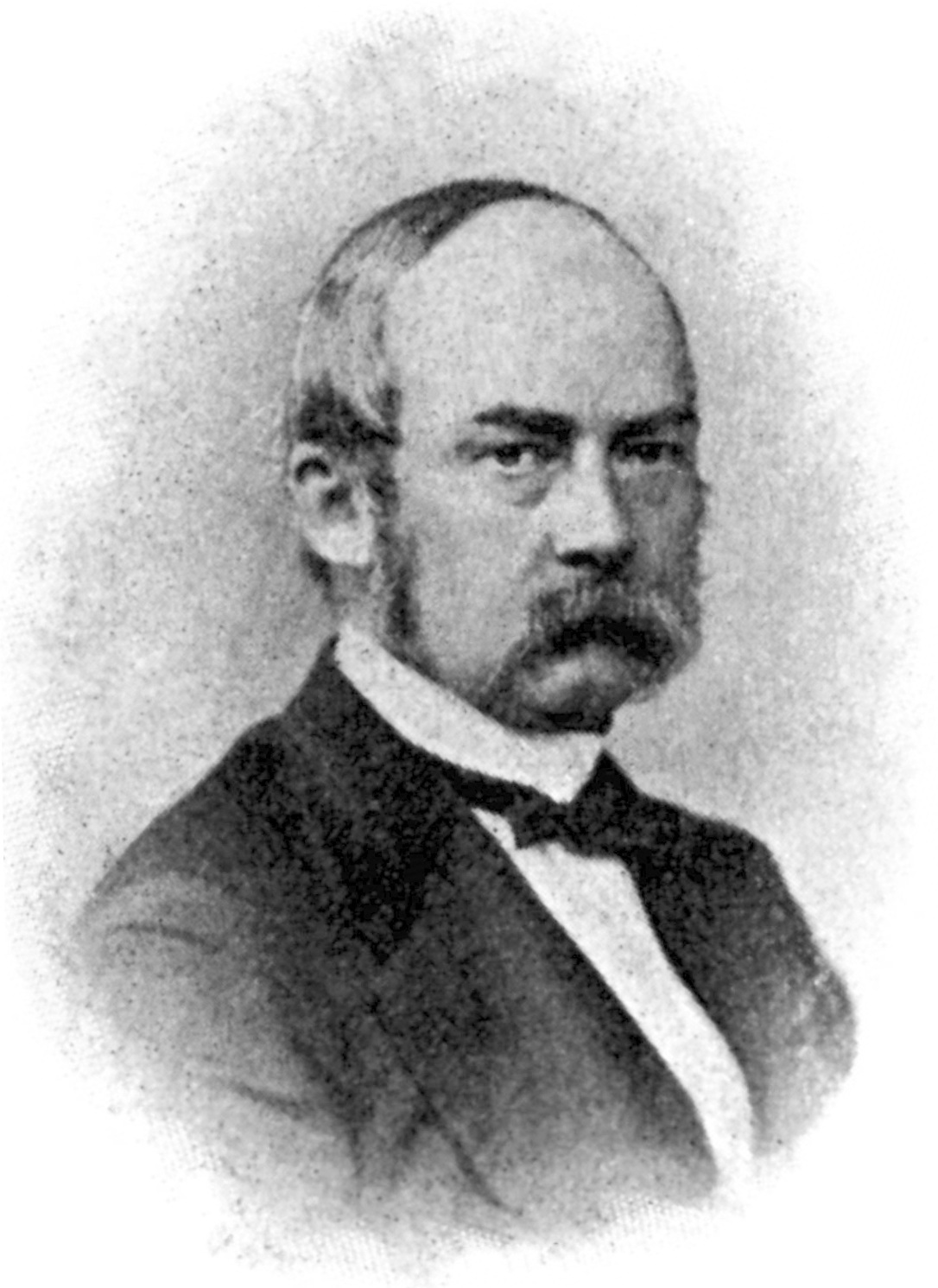
Felix von Niemeyer

Felix von Niemeyer (31 December 1820 – 14 March 1871) was a German internist born in Magdeburg. He was the grandson of theologian August Hermann Niemeyer (1754–1828).

== Biography ==
He studied medicine at the University of Halle and in 1844 started work as a physician in Magdeburg. Later, he was a professor of internal medicine at the University of Greifswald (from 1855), and at the University of Tübingen (from 1860). During the Franco-Prussian War, he served as a medical consultant.

Niemeyer is largely remembered for his written works, in particular, the Lehrbuch der speziellen Pathologie, a textbook that was published in eleven editions up until 1884, and was translated into seven languages. He is also known for espousing a high-protein, low-carbohydrate diet that was in essence a modification of the popular "Banting diet", a regimen endorsed by William Banting (1796–1878), an English undertaker.

In 1848 he was co-founder of the Medizinische Gesellschaft zu Magdeburg (Medical Society of Magdeburg). In 1865 he became a consulting physician to King Charles I of Württemberg, and in 1870, he was elected a foreign member of the Royal Swedish Academy of Sciences.

== Partial list of works ==
- Die asiatische Cholera, ein primär-örtliches Leiden der Darmschleimhaut, in: Die medicinische Reform. Eine Wochenschrift 1, Nr. 19, 1848, 134–138 (Asiatic cholera, a primary local disease of the intestinal mucosa).
- Die symptomatische Behandlung der Cholera mit besonderer Rücksicht auf die Bedeutung des Darmleidens, 1849 (Symptomatic treatment of cholera with special attention given to intestinal disease).
- Klinische Mittheilungen aus dem Städtischen Krankenhause zu Magdeburg, 1855 (Clinical communications from the municipal hospital of Magdeburg).
- Lehrbuch der speciellen Pathologie und Therapie mit besonderer Rücksicht auf Physiologie und pathologische Anatomie, 1858 (Textbook of special pathology and therapy with special reference given to pathological anatomy and physiology).
- The Treatment of Corpulence, by the So-Called Banting System (1865)
