= Jelbart Ice Shelf =

Ice shelf in Antarctica

Coordinates: 70°30′S 4°30′W

The Jelbart Ice Shelf is an ice shelf about 40 nautical miles (70 km) wide, fronting on the coast of Queen Maud Land, Antarctica, northward of Giaever Ridge. It was mapped by Norwegian cartographers from surveys and air photos by the Norwegian–British–Swedish Antarctic Expedition (1949–1952) and named for John E. Jelbart, an Australian observer with the expedition who drowned near Maudheim Station on February 24, 1951.

== See also ==
- Glaciologist Bay
