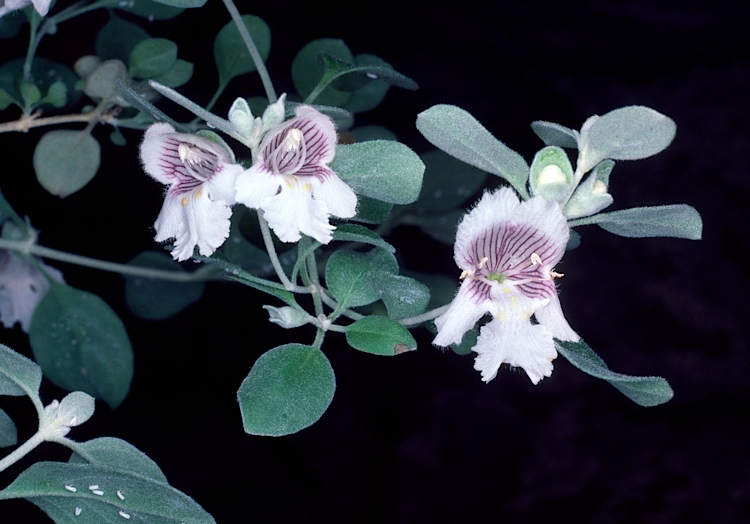

Scientific classification
- Kingdom: Plantae
- Clade: Tracheophytes
- Clade: Angiosperms
- Clade: Eudicots
- Clade: Asterids
- Order: Lamiales
- Family: Lamiaceae
- Genus: Prostanthera
- Species: P. suborbicularis

Binomial name
- Prostanthera suborbicularis C.T.White & W.D.Francis
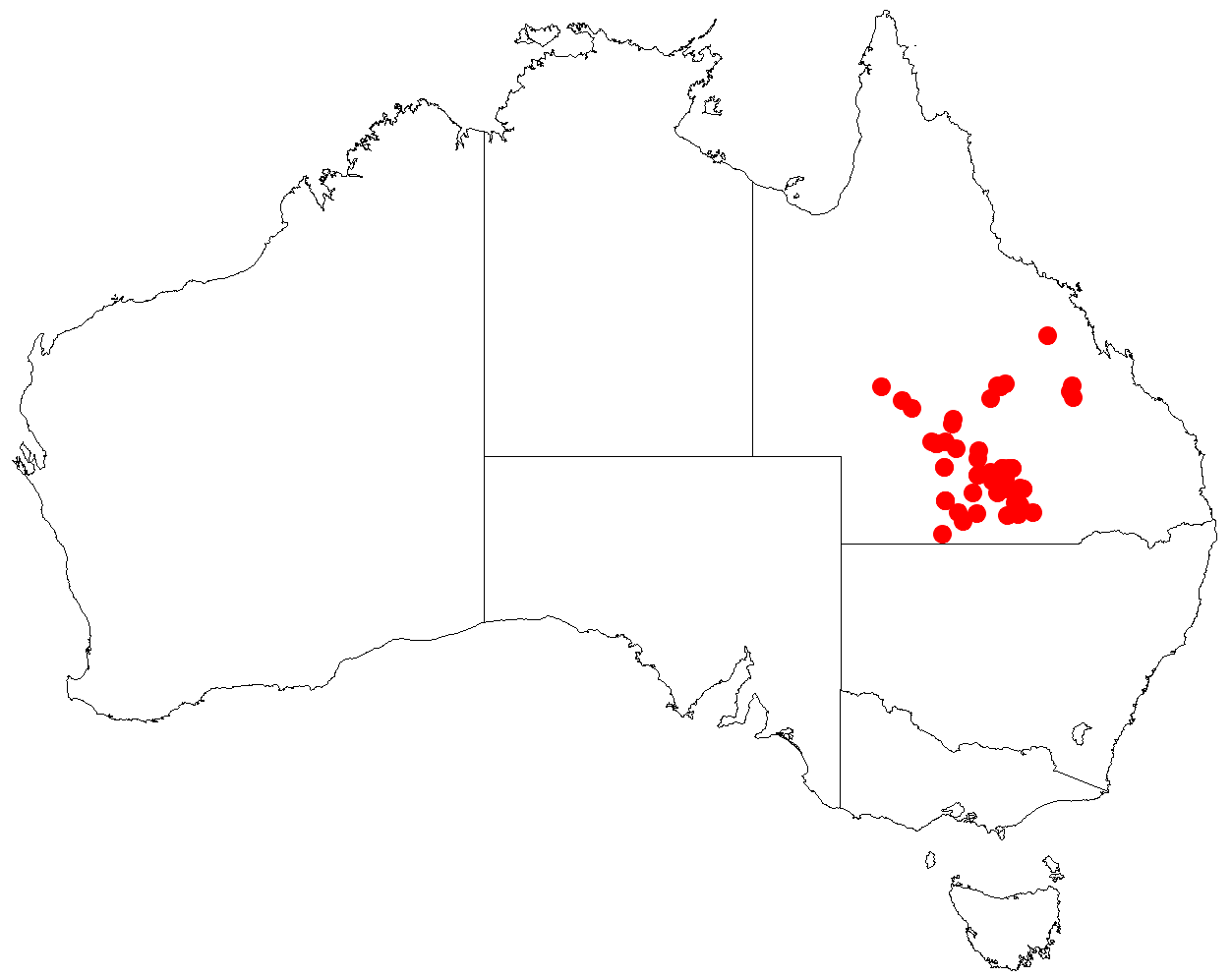
- Occurrence data from AVH

= Prostanthera suborbicularis =

Mount Vincent mint bush

Species of flowering plant

Prostanthera suborbicularis is a species of flowering plant in the family Lamiaceae and is endemic to Queensland. It is a shrub with broadly elliptical to round leaves.

== Description ==
Prostanthera suborbicularis is a shrub or undershrub that has its branches and leaves covered with short, matted hairs. The leaves leathery, broadly elliptic to more or less round, 7–10 mm (0.28–0.39 in) in diameter on a petiole up to 2 mm (0.079 in) long. The flowers are arranged singly in leaf axils on pedicels up to 2 mm (0.079 in) long, with bracteoles at the base of the sepals. The sepals are almost 4 mm (0.16 in) long with two lobes, the upper lobe about 4 mm (0.16 in) long, the lower about 3 mm (0.12 in) long. The petals are 13–15 mm (0.51–0.59 in) long forming a tube almost 8 mm (0.31 in) long.

== Taxonomy and naming ==
Prostanthera suborbicularis was first formally described in 1926 by Cyril Tenison White and William Douglas Francis in the Proceedings of the Royal Society of Queensland from specimens collected near Adavale.

== Distribution ==
This mint bush grows in Queensland.

== Conservation status ==
This mintbush is listed as of "least concern" under the Queensland Government Nature Conservation Act 1992.
