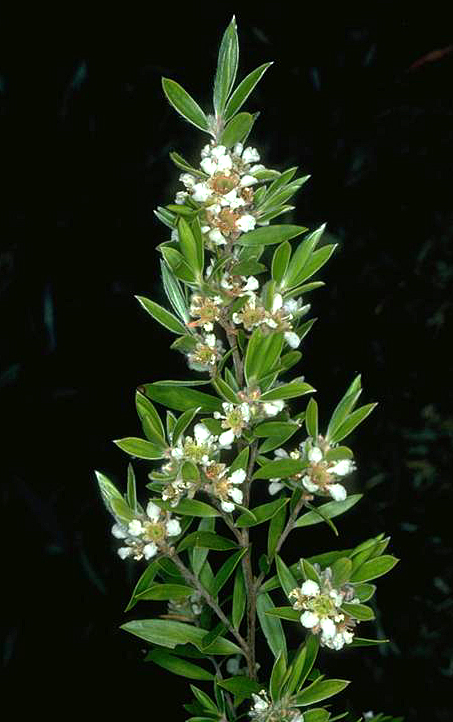
- In the Australian National Botanic Gardens

Scientific classification
- Kingdom: Plantae
- Clade: Tracheophytes
- Clade: Angiosperms
- Clade: Eudicots
- Clade: Rosids
- Order: Myrtales
- Family: Myrtaceae
- Genus: Aggreflorum
- Species: A. ellipticum

Binomial name
- Aggreflorum ellipticum (C.T.White & W.D.Francis) Peter G.Wilson

Synonyms
- Agonis elliptica C.T.White & W.D.Francis; Leptospermum whitei Cheel; Agonis elliptica var. angustifolia C.T.White & W.D.Francis

= Aggreflorum ellipticum =

Species of shrub

Aggreflorum ellipticum is a species of shrub that is endemic to eastern Australia. It has fibrous, flaky bark, elliptical leaves, white flowers arranged in small groups on the ends of short side branches, and fruit that falls from the plant when mature.

== Description ==
Aggreflorum ellipticum is a shrub that typically grows to a height of 3 m (9.8 ft) or more with reddish brown, fibrous or flaky bark, the younger stems covered with soft hairs. The leaves are elliptical, up to 25 mm (0.98 in) long and 3–4 mm (0.12–0.16 in) wide with a blunt point and tapering to a very short petiole. The flowers are white with several together on short side shoots, each flower about 10 mm (0.39 in) wide. The floral cup is densely covered with short, silky hairs, and about 2–3 mm (0.079–0.118 in) long. The sepals are hairy, oblong to hemispherical, about 1.5 mm (0.059 in) long, the petals 3–5 mm (0.12–0.20 in) long and the stamens about 1.5 mm (0.059 in) long. Flowering mainly occurs from October to January and the fruit is a capsule about 3–4 mm (0.12–0.16 in) with the remains of the sepals attached, but which fall from the plant when mature.

== Taxonomy and naming ==
This tea-tree was formally described in 1920 by Cyril Tenison White and William D. Francis who gave it the name Agonis elliptica and published the description in the Botany Bulletin of the Department of Agriculture, Queensland from specimens collected by Francis near Beerwah. In 2023, Peter Gordon Wilson changed the name to Aggreflorum ellipticum.

== Distribution and habitat ==
Aggreflorum ellipticum grows in swampy, coastal heath between Wide Bay in Queensland and Coffs Harbour in New South Wales.
