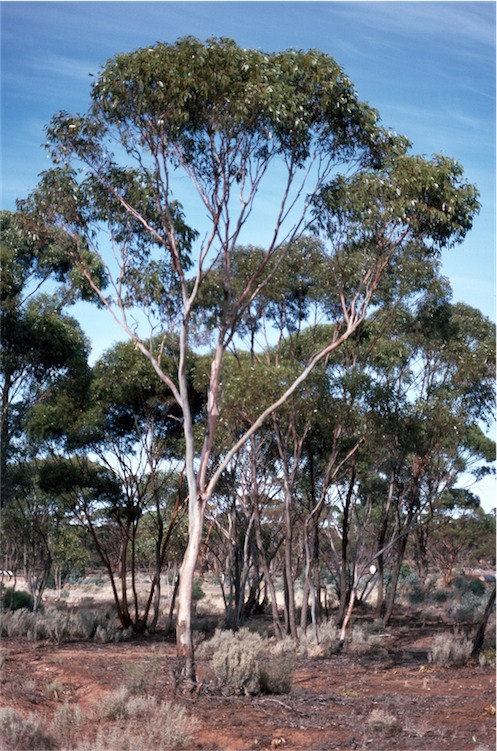
- Eucalyptus corrugata growing near Southern Cross

Conservation status
- Least Concern (IUCN 3.1)

Scientific classification
- Kingdom: Plantae
- Clade: Embryophytes
- Clade: Tracheophytes
- Clade: Spermatophytes
- Clade: Angiosperms
- Clade: Eudicots
- Clade: Rosids
- Order: Myrtales
- Family: Myrtaceae
- Genus: Eucalyptus
- Species: E. corrugata

Binomial name
- Eucalyptus corrugata Luehm.

= Eucalyptus corrugata =

Rough fruited mallee

Species of eucalyptus

Eucalyptus corrugata, also known as rough fruited mallee or rib-fruited mallee, is a species of tree or mallee that is endemic to Western Australia. It has rough scaly or fibrous bark on the lower part of its trunk, smooth bark above, glossy, lance-shaped adult leaves, prominently corrugated flower buds arranged in groups of three in leaf axils and ribbed, conical to cup-shaped fruit.

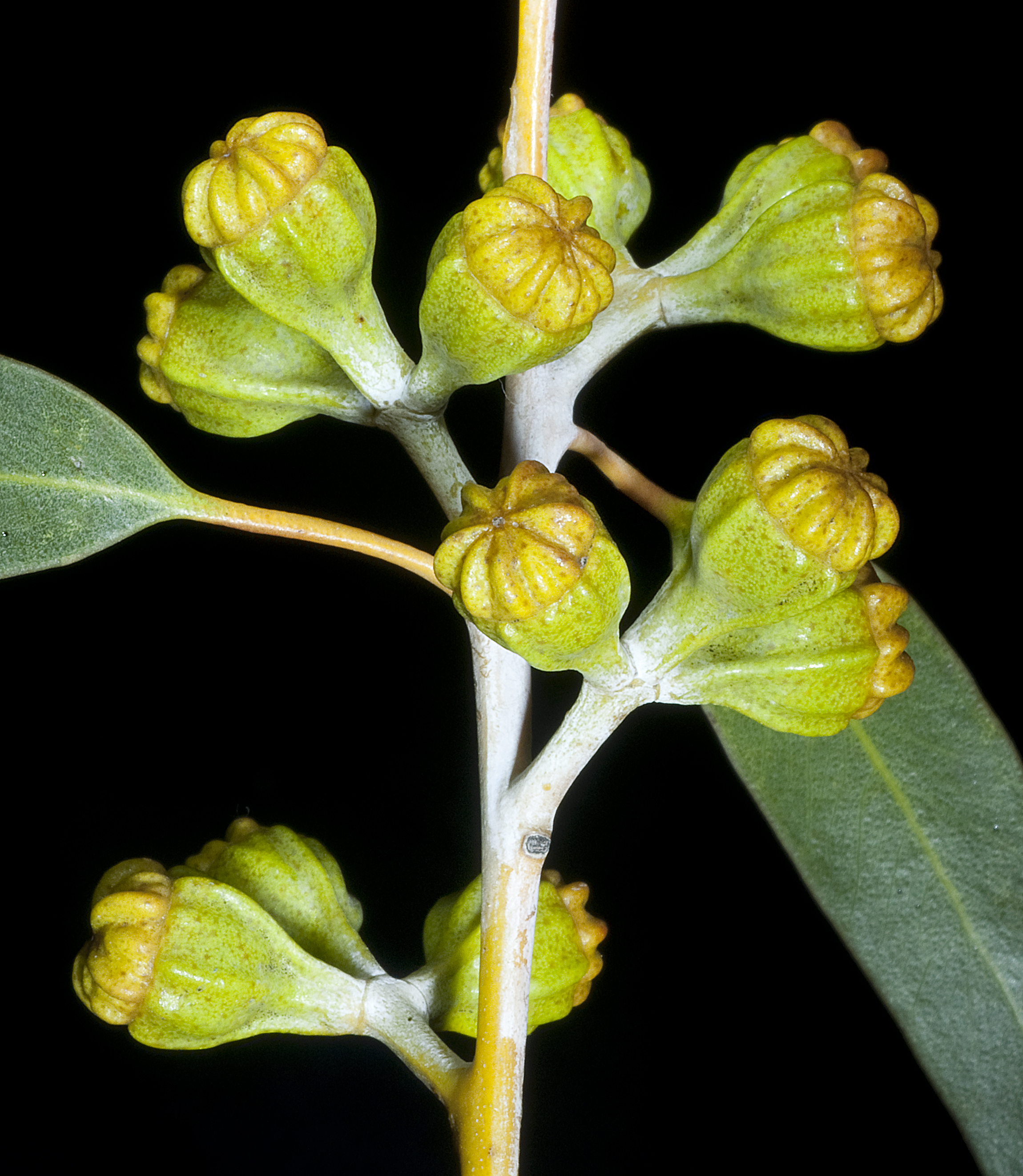
Flower buds

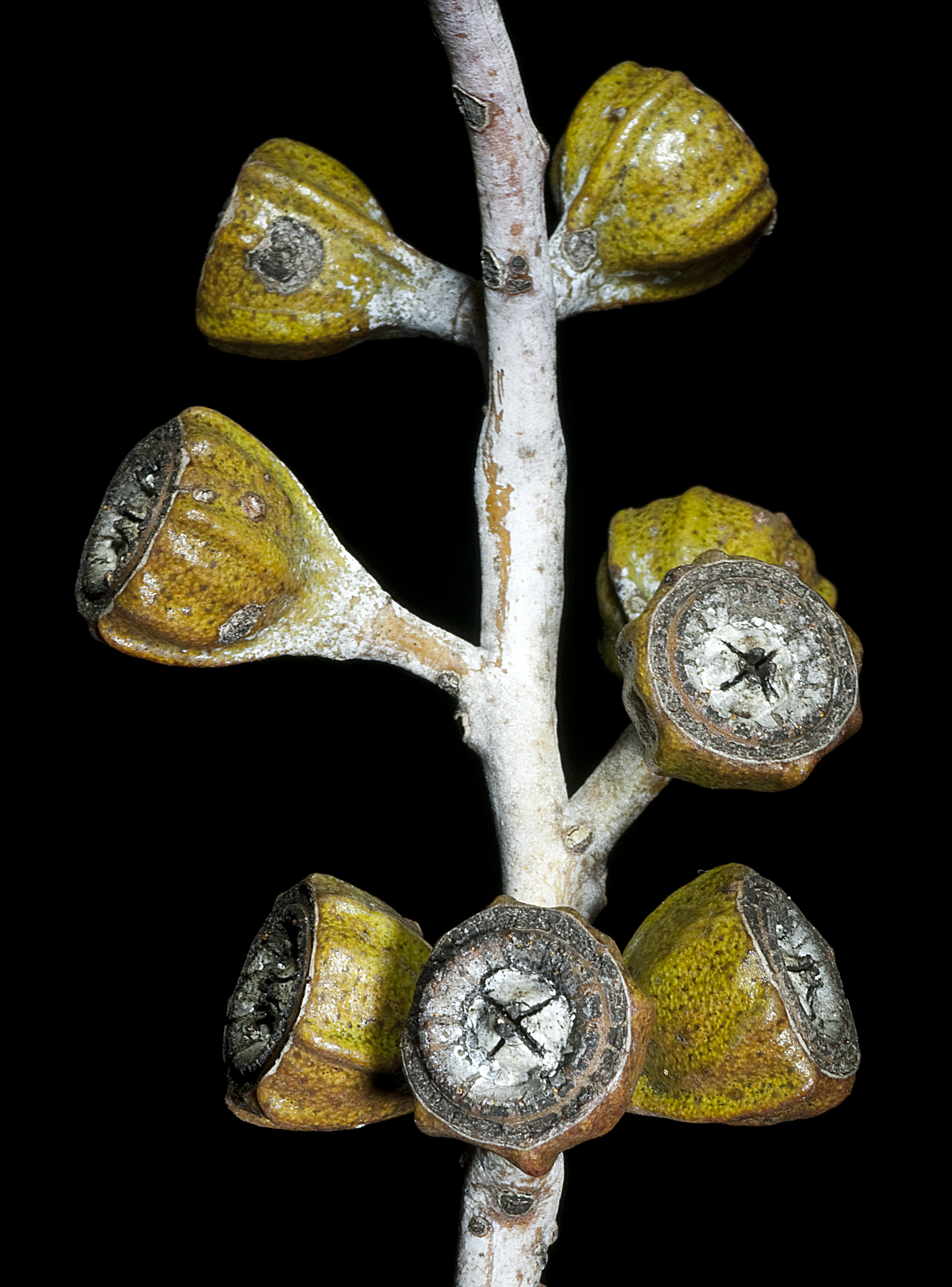
Fruit

== Description ==
Eucalyptus corrugata is typically a tree that grows to a height of 4 to 15 metres (13 to 49 ft), sometimes a mallee, and forms a lignotuber. The bark on up to 2 m (6 ft 7 in) of the lower part of the trunk is rough, fibrous or flaky, dark brown to greyish. The bark on the upper part of the trunk and on the branches is smooth and grey over salmon pink. Leaves on young plants and on coppice regrowth are glaucous, 55–90 mm (2.2–3.5 in) long and 25–40 mm (0.98–1.57 in) wide. The adult leaves are arranged alternately, thick, the same glossy green on both sides and lance-shaped to curved. They are 90–130 mm (3.5–5.1 in) long and 12–20 mm (0.47–0.79 in) wide on a petiole 12–25 mm (0.47–0.98 in) long. The flower buds are arranged in groups of three in leaf axils on a peduncle 7–18 mm (0.28–0.71 in) long, the individual buds on a pedicel 4–8 mm (0.16–0.31 in) long. Mature buds are pear-shaped to more or less spherical, 10–18 mm (0.39–0.71 in) long and 9–13 mm (0.35–0.51 in) wide with prominent corrugations along the side. The operculum is rounded or flattened, 4–8 mm (0.16–0.31 in) long. Flowering occurs between October and March and the flowers are white. The fruit is a woody cup-shaped to conical capsule 7–15 mm (0.28–0.59 in) long and 11–18 mm (0.43–0.71 in) wide on a pedicel 3–5 mm (0.12–0.20 in) long with ribs along the sides and valves that extend well beyond the rim of the fruit.

== Taxonomy and naming ==
Eucalyptus corrugata was first formally described by the botanist Johann George Luehmann in 1897 in The Victorian Naturalist, from a specimen collected from the Golden Valley near Bullfinch. The specific epithet (corrugata) is a Latin word meaning "wrinkled" or "ridged", referring to the ribbed operculum of the buds.

== Distribution and habitat ==
The rough-fruited mallee is distributed through the Avon Wheatbelt, Coolgardie and Murchison biogeographic regions of Western Australia, especially between Westonia, Mount Jackson, Kalgoorlie and Marvel Loch. It grows in open woodland and shrubland in rocky clay loam soils.

== Conservation status ==
This eucalypt is classified as "not threatened" by the Western Australian Government Department of Parks and Wildlife.

== See also ==
- List of Eucalyptus species
