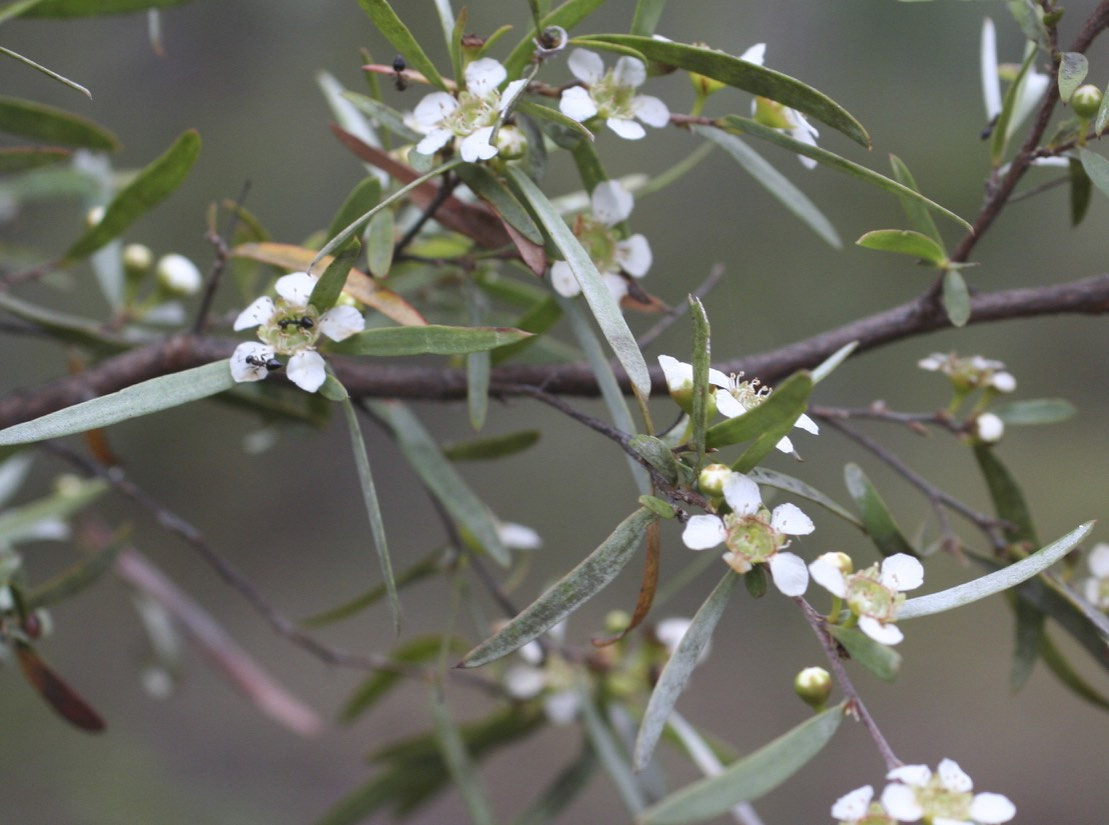

Scientific classification
- Kingdom: Plantae
- Clade: Tracheophytes
- Clade: Angiosperms
- Clade: Eudicots
- Clade: Rosids
- Order: Myrtales
- Family: Myrtaceae
- Genus: Aggreflorum
- Species: A. brachyandrum

Binomial name
- Aggreflorum brachyandrum (F.Muell.) Peter G.Wilson
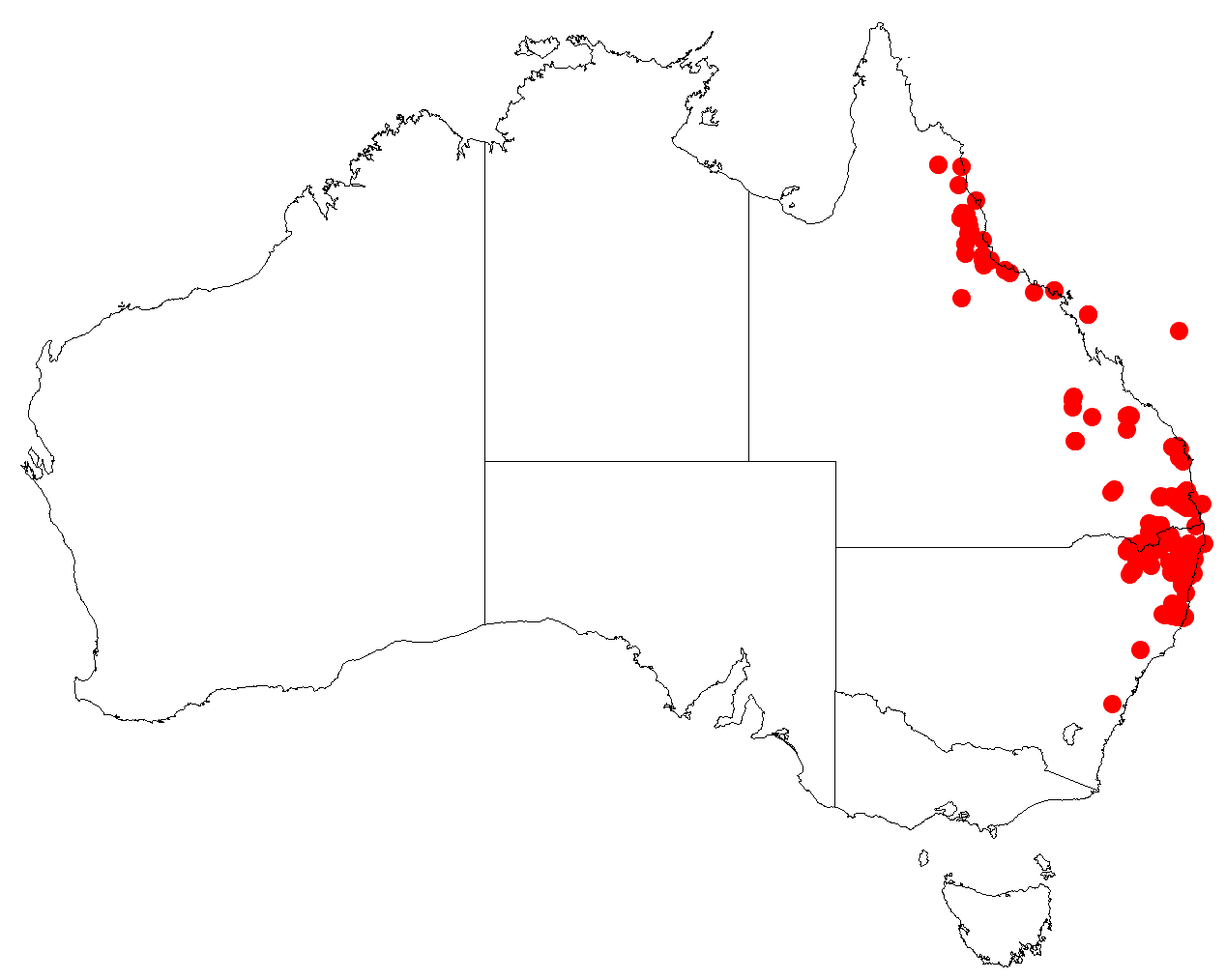
- Occurrence data from AVH

Synonyms
- Kunzea brachyandra F.Muell.; Leptospermum brachyandrum (F.Muell.) Druce; Agonis abnormis (F.Muell. ex Benth.) C.T.White & W.D.Francis; Leptospermum abnorme F.Muell. ex Benth.

= Aggreflorum brachyandrum =

Australian species of plant

Aggreflorum brachyandrum is a species of shrub or small tree that is endemic to eastern Australia. It has smooth bark, linear to lance-shaped leaves, white flowers and usually grows along creeks, often in water.

== Description ==
Aggreflorum brachyandrum is a shrub or small tree that typically grows to a height of 4–6 m (13–20 ft) and has smooth bark that is shed in strips. Young stems are slender and densely hairy at first. The leaves are linear to lance-shaped, 20–50 mm (0.79–1.97 in) long, 2–4 mm (0.079–0.157 in) wide and more or less sessile. The flowers are borne singly or in groups of up to seven in leaf axils or on the ends of branchlets and are about 7 mm (0.28 in) in diameter. The floral cup is mostly glabrous, about 3 mm (0.12 in) long. The sepals are about 1 mm (0.039 in) long and remain attached as the fruit develops. The petals are 2–3 mm (0.079–0.118 in) long and white and the stamens are about 1 mm (0.039 in) long. Flowering occurs from November to January and the fruit is a woody capsule 4 mm (0.16 in) in diameter.

== Taxonomy and naming ==
This tea-tree was first formally described in 1919 by Ferdinand von Mueller who gave it the name Kunzea brachyandra and published the description in his Fragmenta phytographiae Australiae. In 2023, Peter Gordon Wilson changed the name to Aggreflorum brachyandrum. The specific epithet (brachyandrum) is derived from ancient Greek words meaning "short" and "male", referring to the stamens which are shorter than those of kunzeas.

== Distribution and habitat ==
Aggreflorum brachyandrum usually grows in shrubby forest along rocky creeks, often in water. It is found in coastal and near-coastal areas from North Queensland to Port Macquarie in northern New South Wales.
