= Woodlands Botanical Garden =

Woodlands Botanic Garden
- Location: 134 Marsiling Rd, Singapore 730134
- Land area: 4,000 square metres (43,000 sq ft)
- Website: Official website

The Woodlands Botanical Garden (WBG) is a botanical garden in the suburb of Marsiling in Woodlands, Singapore. Occupying more than 4,000 square metres (43,000 sq ft), it is the largest community garden under the National Parks Board's Community in Bloom gardening programme. WBG holds more than 350 plant species and 300 animal species.

== History ==
The garden first took shape in 2020, when graduate research officer Ganesh Kumar planted a pink hibiscus at what was then a barren slope opposite his house in Marsiling. In July 2020, as he began to plant more and visitors to the area grew, he convinced authorities from the National Parks Board (NParks) to sanction a community garden called the Woodlands Botanical Garden. Over time, it became the largest community garden under NParks' Community in Bloom gardening programme, spanning nine storeys and over 4,000 square metres (43,000 sq ft). In 2022, WBG won NParks' Garden of the Year award.

== Grounds ==
Emily Soh, a postdoctoral fellow at the National University of Singapore's Asia Research Institute described the garden as "probably the most biodiverse spot in Singapore." WBG holds more than 350 plant species and 300 animal species, including more than 80 types of butterflies. The garden has a pond roughly 4 square metres (43 sq ft) large, featuring aquatic plants such as Pontederia crassipes (common water hyacinth), Bacopa caroliniana (water hyssop), Ludwigia sedioides (mosaic flower), Equisetum hyemale (horsetail), and Leptospermum madidum (weeping tea tree).

In September 2024, a rare Parthenos sylvia lilacinus, native to Singapore but previously described as extinct, was spotted multiple times at the garden.

Numerous events, ranging from biodiversity talks to concerts to walks, are also held at the garden throughout the year.
