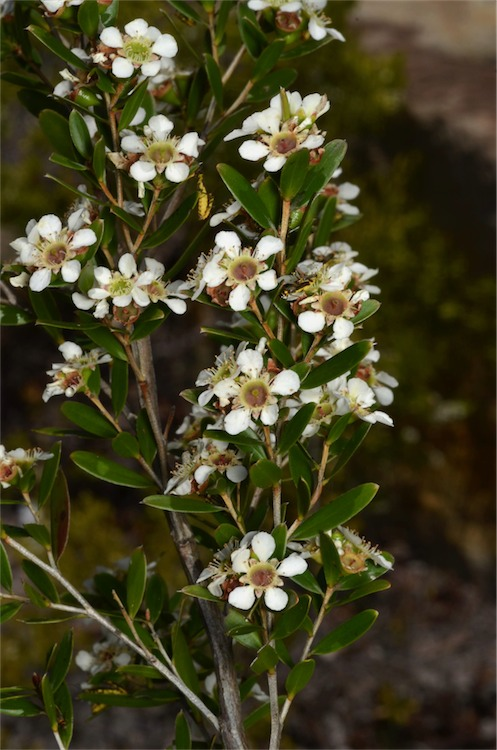
- Aggreflorum benwellii in Mt. Annan Botanic Garden

Scientific classification
- Kingdom: Plantae
- Clade: Tracheophytes
- Clade: Angiosperms
- Clade: Eudicots
- Clade: Rosids
- Order: Myrtales
- Family: Myrtaceae
- Tribe: Leptospermeae
- Genus: Aggreflorum; Peter G.Wilson

= Aggreflorum =

Genus of shrubs

Aggreflorum is a genus of nine species of shrubs and small trees in the myrtle family Myrtaceae previously included in Leptospermum . It was first formally described by Peter Gordon Wilson and Margaret M. Heslewood in the journal Taxon.

== Species ==
The following is a list of species accepted by the Plants of the World Online as at July 2024.

- Aggreflorum anfractum (A.R.Bean) Peter G.Wilson (Qld.)
- Aggreflorum benwellii (A.R.Bean) Peter G.Wilson (N.S.W.)
- Aggreflorum brachyandrum (F.Muell.) Peter G.Wilson (Qld., N.S.W.)
- Aggreflorum ellipticum (C.T.White & W.D.Francis) Peter G.Wilson (Qld., N.S.W.)
- Aggreflorum longifolium (C.T.White & W.D.Francis) Peter G.Wilson (W.A., Qld., N.T.)
- Aggreflorum luehmannii (F.M.Bailey) Peter G.Wilson (Qld.)
- Aggreflorum pallidum (A.R.Bean) Peter G.Wilson (Qld.)
- Aggreflorum purpurascens (Joy Thomps.) Peter G.Wilson (Qld.)
- Aggreflorum speciosum (Schauer) Peter G.Wilson (Qld., N.S.W.)
