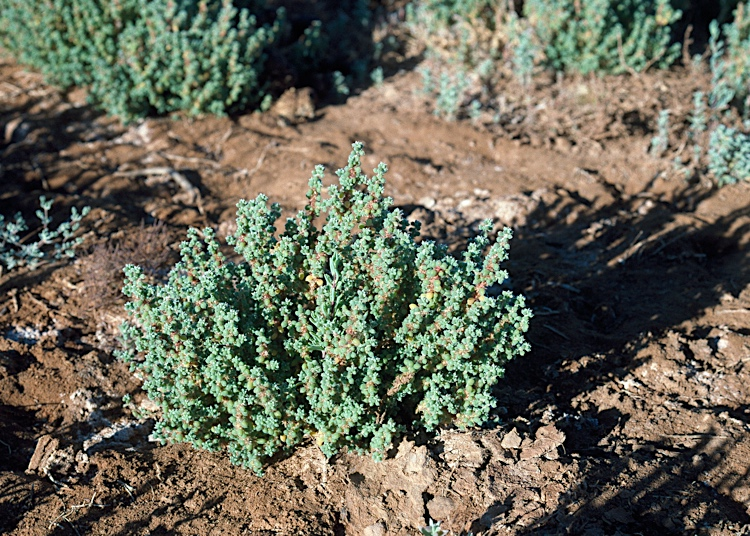

Scientific classification
- Kingdom: Plantae
- Clade: Tracheophytes
- Clade: Angiosperms
- Clade: Eudicots
- Order: Caryophyllales
- Family: Amaranthaceae
- Genus: Maireana
- Species: M. luehmannii

Binomial name
- Maireana luehmannii (F.Muell.) Paul G.Wilson

Synonyms
- Austrobassia luehmannii (F.Muell.) Ulbr.; Bassia luehmanni F.Muell. orth. var.; Bassia luehmannii F.Muell.; Mairiana luehmannii J.W.Green orth. var.

= Maireana luehmannii =

Species of plant

Maireana luehmannii, commonly known as Luehman's bluebush, is a species of flowering plant in the family Amaranthaceae and is endemic to Australia. It is an erect, widely branched perennial herb, shrub or subshrub with woolly branches when young, fleshy, egg-shaped leaves, and pairs of bisexual flowers, the fruiting perianth flattened with five wings divided into two or more spiny lobes.

== Description ==
Maireana luehmannii is an erect, widely branched perennial herb, shrub or subshrub that typically grows to a height of up to 40 cm (16 in) and has branches covered with woolly hairs when young. Its leaves are arranged alternately, fleshy, egg-shaped with the narrower ends towards the base, 2–13 mm (0.079–0.512 in) long and 1.5–3.5 mm (0.059–0.138 in) wide, and covered with short, silky hairs. The flowers are bisexual, arranged in pairs in leaf axils. The fruiting perianth is almost woody, 5–12 mm (0.20–0.47 in) wide, the upper perianth flat with five wings 2–3 mm (0.079–0.118 in) long, often irregularly curved and divided into two or more spiny lobes.

== Taxonomy ==
This species was first described in 1890 by Ferdinand von Mueller who gave it the name Bassia luehmannii in The Victorian Naturalist from specimens collected near the Finke River by "Rev. W.F.Schwarz". In 1975, Paul G. Wilson transferred the species to Maireana as M. luehmannii in the journal Nuytsia. The specific epithet (luehmannii) honours Johann George Luehmann.

== Distribution and habitat ==
Luehman's bluebush grows near salt lakes from east-central Western Australia to the south of the Northern Territory, northern South Australia and Western Queensland.

== Conservation status ==
Maireana luehmannii is listed as "not threatened" by the Government of Western Australia Department of Biodiversity, Conservation and Attractions, of "least concern" under the northern Territory Government Territory Parks and Wildlife Conservation Act and the Queensland Government Nature Conservation Act 1992.
