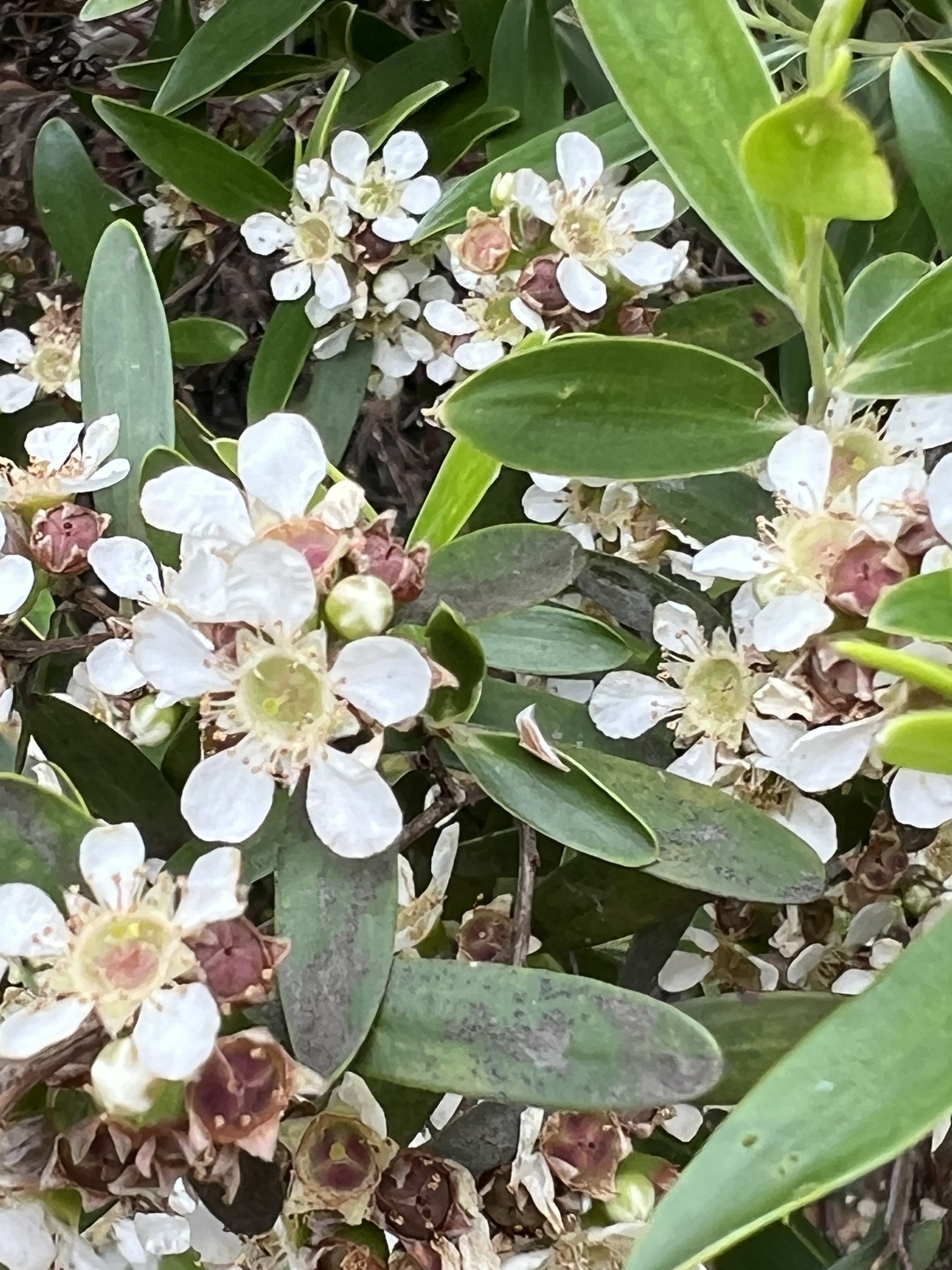
- In the Australian National Botanic Gardens

Scientific classification
- Kingdom: Plantae
- Clade: Tracheophytes
- Clade: Angiosperms
- Clade: Eudicots
- Clade: Rosids
- Order: Myrtales
- Family: Myrtaceae
- Genus: Aggreflorum
- Species: A. luehmannii

Binomial name
- Aggreflorum luehmannii F.M.Bailey Peter G.Wilson

Synonyms
- Agonis luehmannii (F.M.Bailey) C.D.White & W.D.Francis; Leptospermum luehamanni F.M.Bailey orth. var.

= Aggreflorum luehmannii =

Species of flowering plant

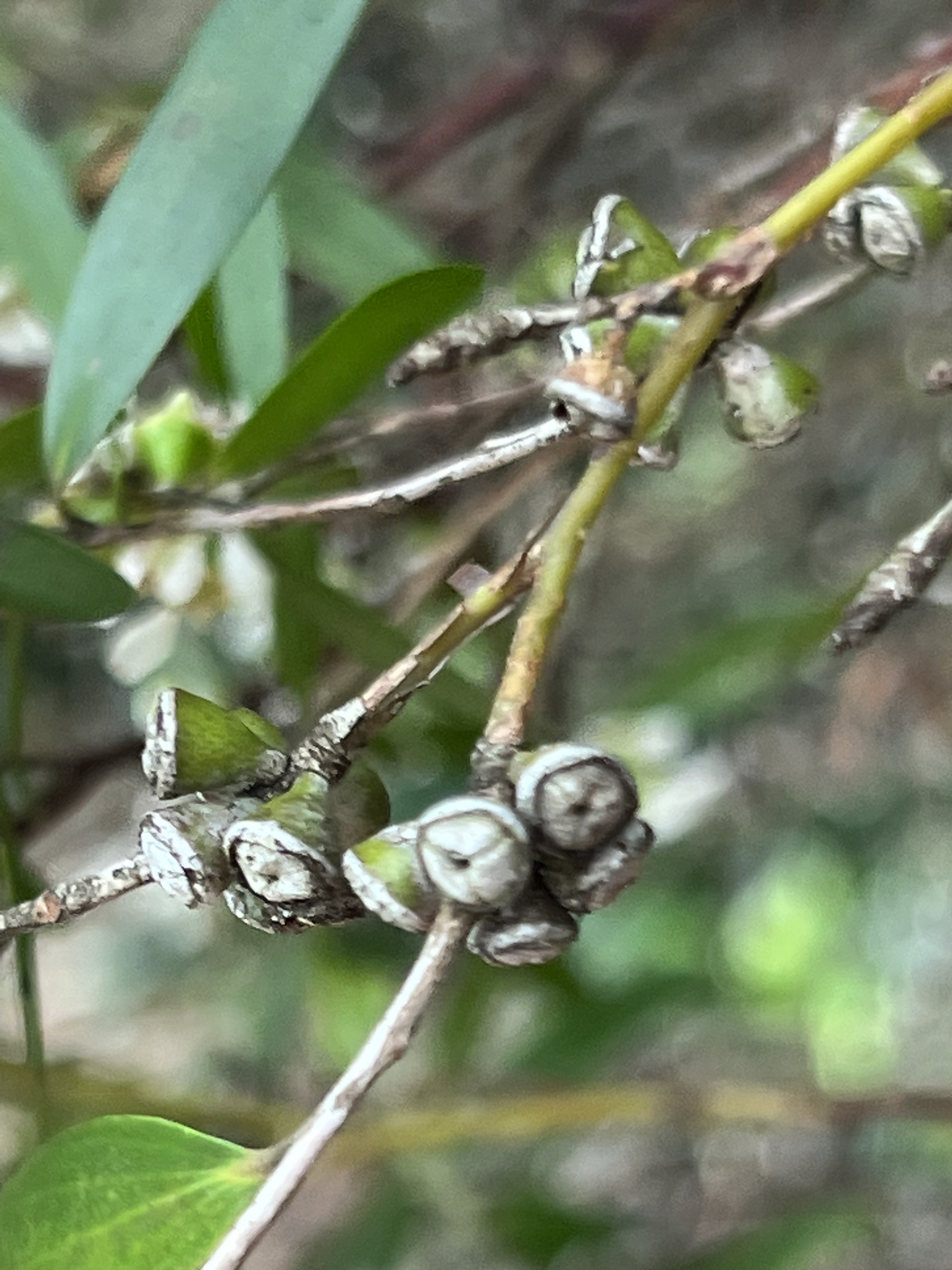
Fruit

Aggreflorum luehmannii is a species of shrub or small tree that is endemic to Queensland. It has glossy green elliptic leaves, white flowers, and fruit that falls from the plant shortly after the seeds are released.

== Description ==
Aggreflorum luehmannii is a shrub or small tree and that typically grows to a height of 5 m (16 ft). It has smooth, reddish brown bark that peels in long strips. The leaves are elliptical, glossy when mature, mostly 15–40 mm (0.59–1.57 in) long and 6–9 mm (0.24–0.35 in) wide on a very short petiole. The flowers are white, 6–12 mm (0.24–0.47 in) wide on a short pedicel and arranged on short shoots on the upper leaf axils. The floral cup is glabrous, 2–3 mm (0.079–0.118 in) long, the sepals blunt triangular 1–1.5 mm (0.039–0.059 in) long, the petals mostly 5–6 mm (0.20–0.24 in) long and the stamens 1–2 mm (0.039–0.079 in) long. Flowering mainly occurs from January to February and the fruit is a capsule 4–5 mm (0.16–0.20 in) wide and that is shed soon after the seeds are released.

== Taxonomy and naming ==
This species was first formally described in 1900 by Frederick Manson Bailey who gave it the name Leptospermum luehmannii in his book The Queensland Flora. In 2023, Peter Gordon Wilson transferred the species to the genus Aggreflorum as A. luehmannii in the journal Taxon. The specific epithet honours J.G.Luehmann.

== Distribution and habitat ==
This tea-tree grows on the summit and slopes of the Glass House Mountains and in the Numinbah Valley.
