= Aggreflorum pallidum =

Conservation status
- Near Threatened (NCA)

Scientific classification
- Kingdom: Plantae
- Clade: Tracheophytes
- Clade: Angiosperms
- Clade: Eudicots
- Clade: Rosids
- Order: Myrtales
- Family: Myrtaceae
- Genus: Aggreflorum
- Species: A. pallidum

Binomial name
- Aggreflorum pallidum (A.R.Bean) Peter G.Wilson

Synonyms
- Leptospermum pallidum A.R.Bean

Species of plant

Aggreflorum pallidum is a species of spreading shrub that is endemic to Queensland. It has thin, firm, rough bark, narrow lance-shaped leaves, white flowers arranged in groups of two or three on side shoots and fruit that remains on the plant until it dies.

== Description ==
Aggreflorum pallidum is a spreading shrub that typically grows to a height of 3 m (9.8 ft) and has thin, firm, rough fissured bark on the branches, the branchlets glabrous. The leaves are narrow lance-shaped, pale yellowish green on both surfaces, 35–52 mm (1.4–2.0 in) long and 5–9 mm (0.20–0.35 in) wide and sessile or on a petiole up to 2 mm (0.079 in) long. The flowers are borne in groups of two or three on side shoots or in leaf axils and are white, 10–15 mm (0.39–0.59 in) wide. The floral cup is 1.5–2 mm (0.059–0.079 in) long and glabrous, and the sepals glabrous with conspicuous oil dots. The petals are more or less round, 3–5 mm (0.12–0.20 in) long and there are thirty to forty stamens that are shorter than the petals. Flowering occurs from March to June and the fruit is a capsule 4.5–5 mm (0.18–0.20 in) long and 5–6 mm (0.20–0.24 in) wide that remains on the plant at maturity with the remains of the sepals attached.

== Taxonomy and naming ==
This species was first formally described in 1992 by Anthony Bean, who gave it the name Leptospermum pallidum in the journal Austrobaileya. In 2023, Peter Gordon Wilson transferred the species to the genus Aggreflorum as A. pallidum in the journal Taxon. The specific epithet (pallidum) is a Latin word meaning "pale", referring to the colour of the leaves.

== Distribution and habitat ==
This tea-tree grows on rocky slopes and cliff edges, mostly near Greenvale but also at Porcupine Gorge.

== Conservation status ==
This species is classified as "near threatened" under the Queensland Government Nature Conservation Act 1992.
