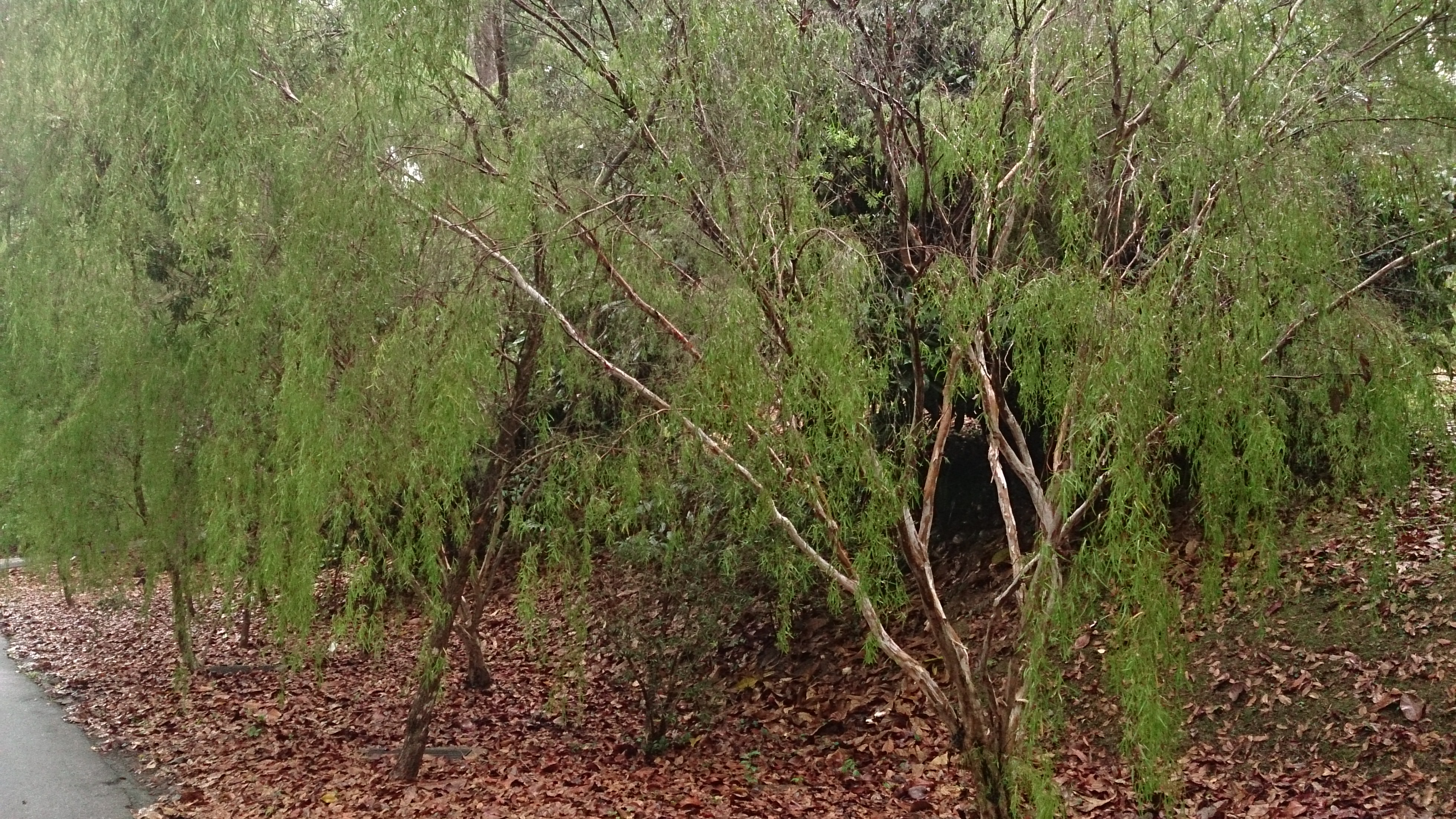

Conservation status
- Data Deficient (IUCN 3.1)

Scientific classification
- Kingdom: Plantae
- Clade: Tracheophytes
- Clade: Angiosperms
- Clade: Eudicots
- Clade: Rosids
- Order: Myrtales
- Family: Myrtaceae
- Genus: Aggreflorum
- Species: A. longifolium

Binomial name
- Aggreflorum longifolium (C.T.White & W.D.Francis) Peter G.Wilson

Synonyms
- Agonis longifolia C.T.White & W.D.Francis; Leptospermum longifolium (C.T.White & W.D.Francis) S.T.Blake; Leptospermum madidum A.R.Bean

= Aggreflorum longifolium =

Species of shrub

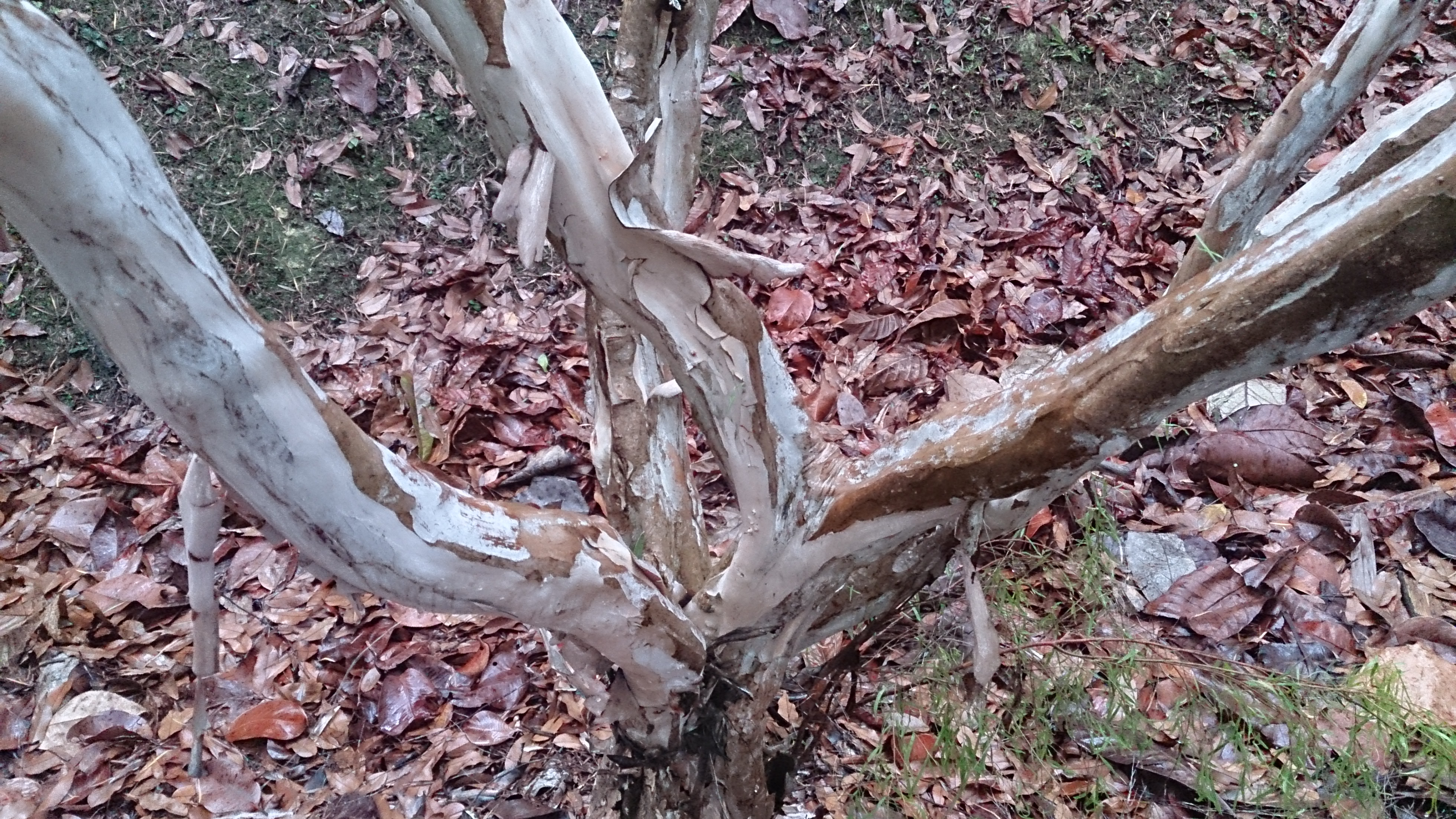
Bark

Aggreflorum longifolium is a species of shrub or small tree that is endemic to north-western Australia. It has weeping branches, smooth bark, pale green linear leaves, small white flowers and thin-walled fruit.

== Description ==
Aggreflorum longifolium is a shrub or tree that typically grows to a height of 1.5–8 m (4 ft 11 in – 26 ft 3 in) and has weeping branches and smooth white, cream-coloured or pink bark. The leaves are arranged alternately, sessile, linear, the same shade of pale green on both sides, 22–70 mm (0.87–2.76 in) long and 1–9 mm (0.039–0.354 in) long. The flower buds are arranged singly in leaf axils surrounded by bracts that are shed before the flower opens. The flowers are 5–7 mm (0.20–0.28 in) wide on a pedicel about 1 mm (0.039 in) long. The floral cup is 2–3 mm (0.079–0.118 in) long, and the sepals have hairy margins. Flowering occurs from July to October and the fruit is a glabrous capsule 2–3 mm (0.079–0.118 in) long and 2.5–5 mm (0.098–0.197 in) wide.

== Taxonomy and naming ==
This species was first formally described in 1920 by Cyril Tenison White and William Douglas Francis who gave it the name Agonis longifolia and published the description in the Botany Bulletin, Department of Agriculture, Queensland. In 2023, Peter Gordon Wilson changed the name to Aggreflorum ellipticum.

In the same journal, Wilson changed the names of 2 subspecies of Leptospermum madidum to Aggreflorum longifolium and the names are accepted by Plants of the World Online:

- Aggreflorum longifolium subsp. longifolium (previously known as Leptospermum madidum A.R.Bean subsp. madidum ) has leaves 4.5–9 mm (0.18–0.35 in) wide and fruits 3.5–5 mm (0.14–0.20 in) wide.
- Aggreflorum longifolium subsp. sativum A.R.Bean has leaves 1–4.5 mm (0.039–0.177 in) wide and fruits 2–3.5 mm (0.079–0.138 in) wide.

== Distribution and habitat ==
Subspecies longifolium is confined to Cape York Peninsula where it grows on the banks of creeks and rivers. Subspecies sativum is found along watercourses and in sandstone gullies in the Kimberley region of Western Australia and the northernmost parts of the Northern Territory.

== Conservation status ==
Aggreflorum longifolium is listed as "not threatened" by the Government of Western Australia Department of Biodiversity, Conservation and Attractions, but subsp. sativum is classified as "Priority Three" meaning that it is poorly known and known from only a few locations but is not under imminent threat.
