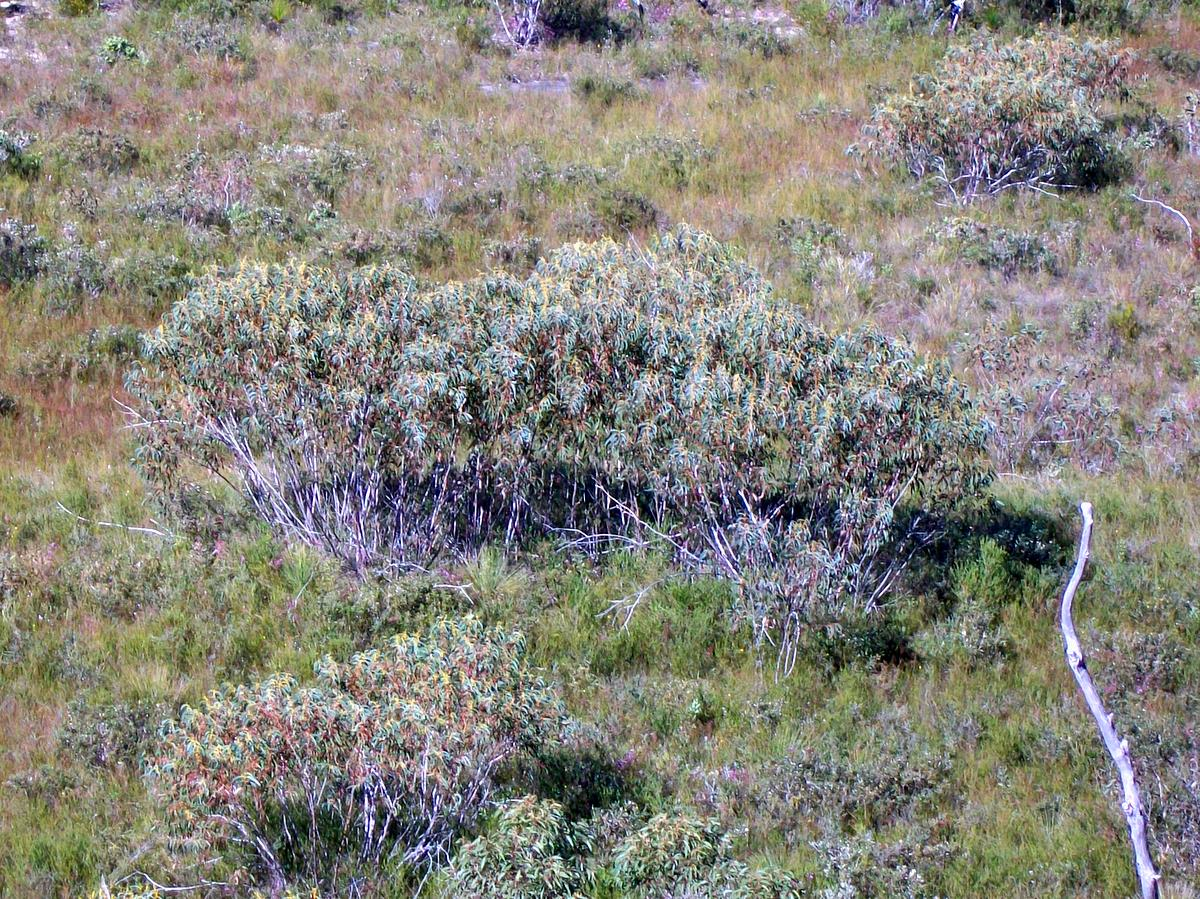
- Eucalyptus luehmanniana at Ku-ring-gai Chase National Park

Conservation status
- Vulnerable (IUCN 3.1)

Scientific classification
- Kingdom: Plantae
- Clade: Tracheophytes
- Clade: Angiosperms
- Clade: Eudicots
- Clade: Rosids
- Order: Myrtales
- Family: Myrtaceae
- Genus: Eucalyptus
- Species: E. luehmanniana

Binomial name
- Eucalyptus luehmanniana F.Muell.

Synonyms
- Eucalyptus leuhmanniana Grimwade orth. var.; Eucalyptus luehmanniana F.Muell. var. luehmanniana; Eucalyptus stellulata var. luehmanniana A.D.Chapm.

= Eucalyptus luehmanniana =

Yellow top mallee ash

Species of eucalyptus

Eucalyptus luehmanniana, commonly known as the yellow top mallee ash, is a species of mallee that is endemic to a small area in New South Wales. It has smooth white bark, lance-shaped to curved adult leaves, flower buds in groups of between seven and eleven or more, white flowers and cup-shaped, urn-shaped or barrel-shaped fruit. It has a restricted distribution on poor, rocky soils near Sydney.

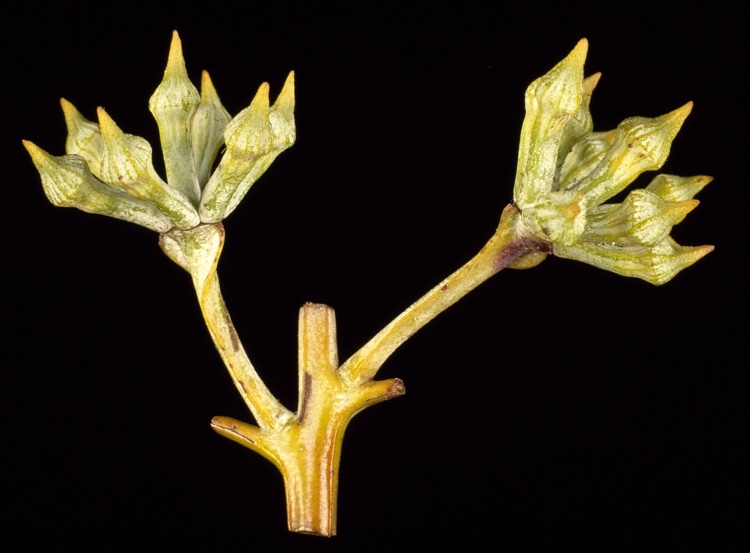
Flower buds

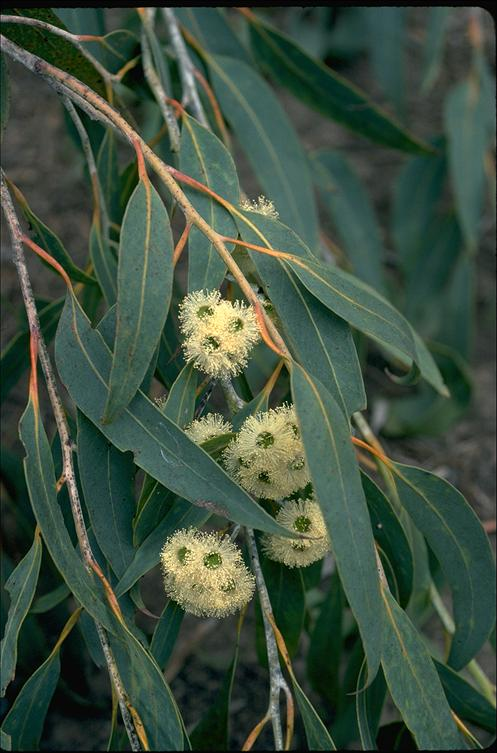
Flowers

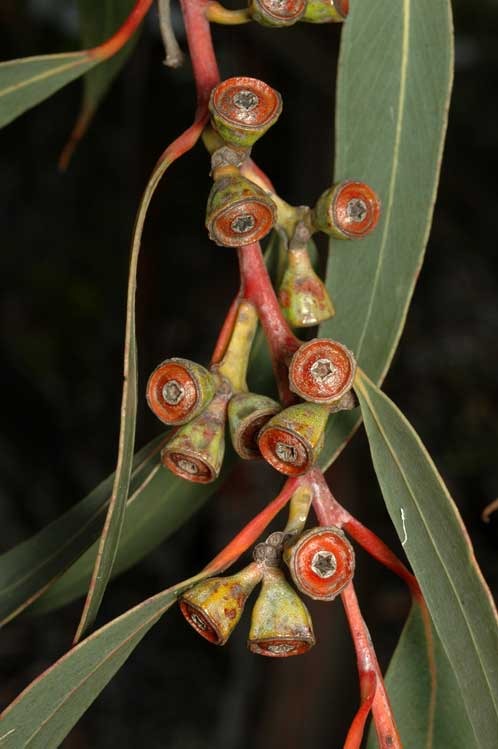
Fruit

== Description ==
Eucalyptus luehmanniana is a mallee that typically grows to a height of 6–7 m (20–23 ft) and forms a lignotuber. It has smooth white to brown bark that is shed in long ribbons. Young plants and coppice regrowth have stems that are more or less square in cross-section and sessile, glossy green, elliptic to broadly lance-shaped leaves that are 70–175 mm (2.8–6.9 in) long and 30–75 mm (1.2–3.0 in) wide. Adult leaves are the same shade of glossy green on both sides, lance-shaped to curved, 100–200 mm (3.9–7.9 in) long and 20–45 mm (0.79–1.77 in) wide on a petiole 17–40 mm (0.67–1.57 in) long. The flower buds are arranged in leaf axils in groups of between seven and eleven or more on a flattened, unbranched peduncle 15–25 mm (0.59–0.98 in) long, the individual buds on pedicels 3–11 mm (0.12–0.43 in) long. Mature buds are club-shaped to diamond shaped, 6–10 mm (0.24–0.39 in) long and 4–7 mm (0.16–0.28 in) wide with a conical operculum about the same size as the floral cup. Flowering occurs between June and December and the flowers are white. The fruit is a woody, cup-shaped, urn-shaped or barrel-shaped capsule 8–13 mm (0.31–0.51 in) long and 9–12 mm (0.35–0.47 in) wide with the valves close to rim level.

This mallee has sometimes been confused with the tree species E. haemastoma and E. stricta.

== Taxonomy and naming ==
Eucalyptus luehmanniana was first formally described in 1878 by Ferdinand von Mueller in Fragmenta phytographiae Australiae. The type specimen was collected in sandy rocky ground by William Kirton, "eight miles north of Bulli at an elevation of 2000 feet".The specific epithet honours Johann George Luehmann, who was Mueller's assistant in the Melbourne Herbarium.

== Distribution and habitat ==
The yellow top mallee ash grows in mallee heath on shallow soils derived from sandstone on the coastal plateau in the Sydney region, between the Hawkesbury River and Bulli. Despite having a restricted distribution, it is locally abundant.

== Culture ==
The fruit of this eucalypt was depicted on the original five dollar note, beside a drawing of Joseph Banks.
