= Aggreflorum anfractum =

Scientific classification
- Kingdom: Plantae
- Clade: Tracheophytes
- Clade: Angiosperms
- Clade: Eudicots
- Clade: Rosids
- Order: Myrtales
- Family: Myrtaceae
- Genus: Aggreflorum
- Species: A. anfractum

Binomial name
- Aggreflorum anfractum (A.R.Bean) Peter G.Wilson
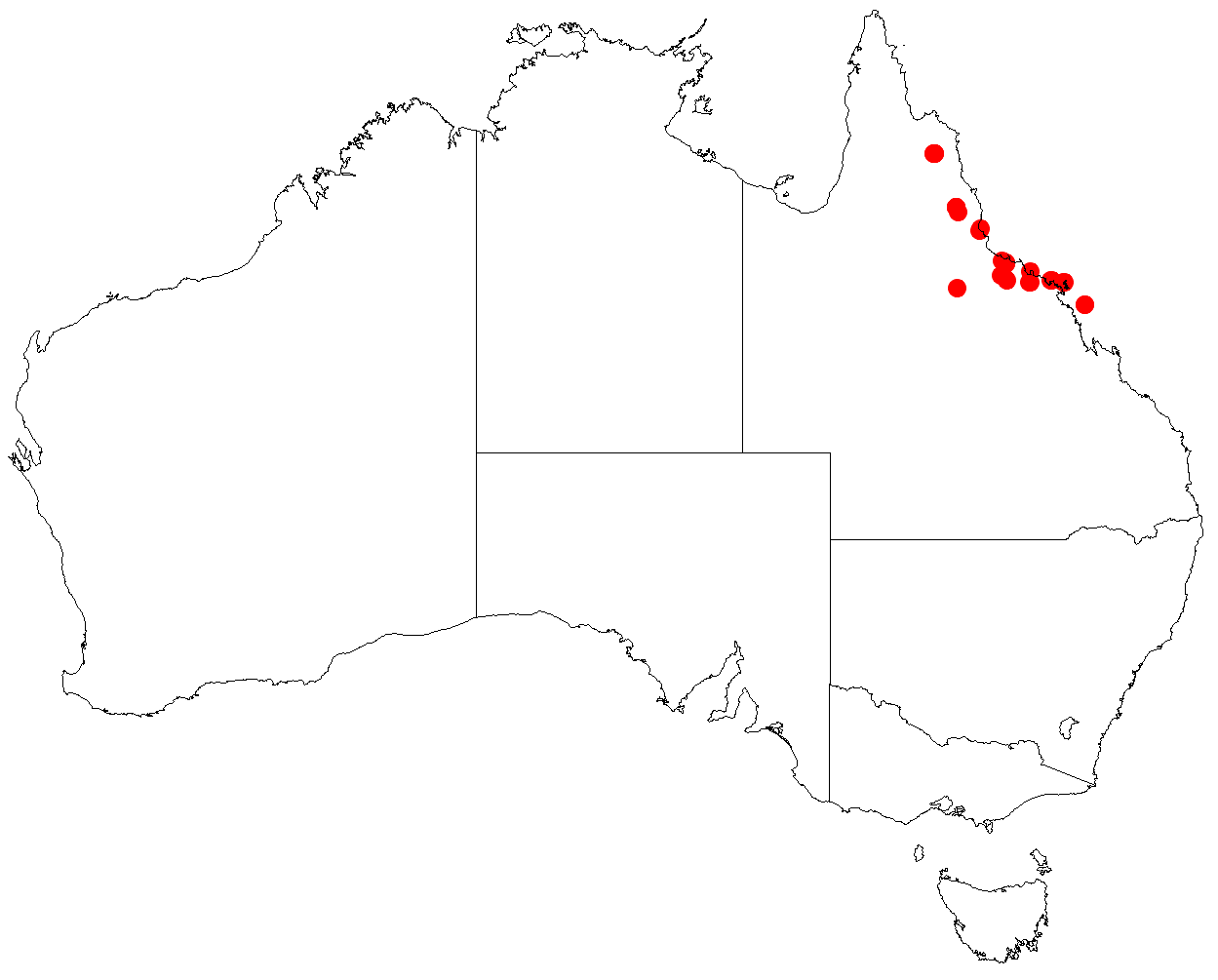
- Occurrence data from AVH

Synonyms
- Leptospermum anfractum A.R.Bean

Australian species of plant

Aggreflorum anfractum is a species of spreading shrub that is endemic to Queensland. It has a smooth, twisted trunk, linear leaves, white flowers borne in leaf axils and bell-shaped to hemispherical fruit. It grows on rocky ridges and cliff edges.

== Description ==
Aggreflorum anfractum is a spreading shrub that typically grows to a height of 2 m (6 ft 7 in) and has a trunk and branches that are smooth, twisted and contorted. The bark is white when new but ages to purplish. The leaves are arranged alternately, more or less sessile, linear in shape, paler on the lower surface, 17–30 mm (0.67–1.18 in) long and 1.5–4.5 mm (0.059–0.177 in) wide. The lower side of the leaves is hairy. The flowers are borne singly or in groups of up to six in leaf axils, each with bracts and bracteoles that fall off before the flower opens. The flowers are 5–7.5 mm (0.20–0.30 in) in diameter on a pedicel 1.5–3 mm (0.059–0.118 in) long with sepals that have hairy edges. The petals are white. Flowering occurs from August to January and the fruit is a thin-walled, bell-shaped to hemispherical capsule about 2 mm (0.079 in) long and 3 mm (0.12 in) wide with the sepals attached.

== Taxonomy and naming ==
This species was first described in 2004 by Anthony Bean who gave it the name Leptospermum anfractum in the journal Telopea. In 2023, Peter Gordon Wilson transferred the species to the genus Aggreflorum as A. anfractum in the journal Taxon. The specific epithet (anfractum) is from the Latin anfractus meaning "bending, winding or crooked" referring to the stems and branches.

== Distribution and habitat ==
This species grows on rocky ridges and cliff lines between Cardwell and Proserpine with a disjunct population near Laura.

== Conservation status ==
This species is classified as of "least concern" under the Queensland Government Nature Conservation Act 1992.
