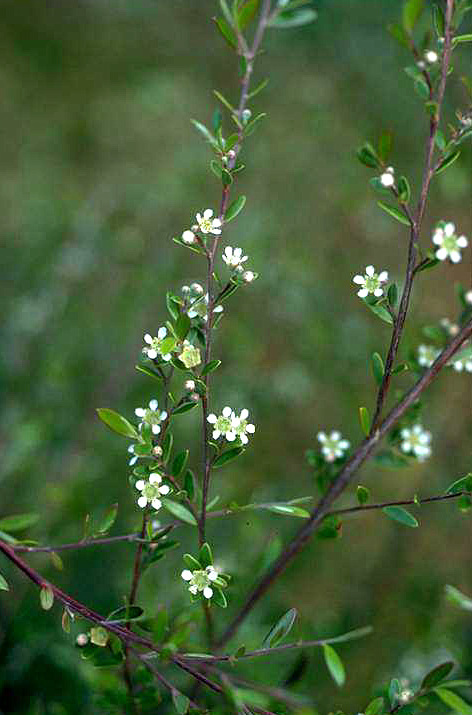

Scientific classification
- Kingdom: Plantae
- Clade: Tracheophytes
- Clade: Angiosperms
- Clade: Eudicots
- Clade: Rosids
- Order: Myrtales
- Family: Myrtaceae
- Genus: Aggreflorum
- Species: A. purpurascens

Binomial name
- Aggreflorum purpurascens (Joy Thomps.) Peter G.Wilson
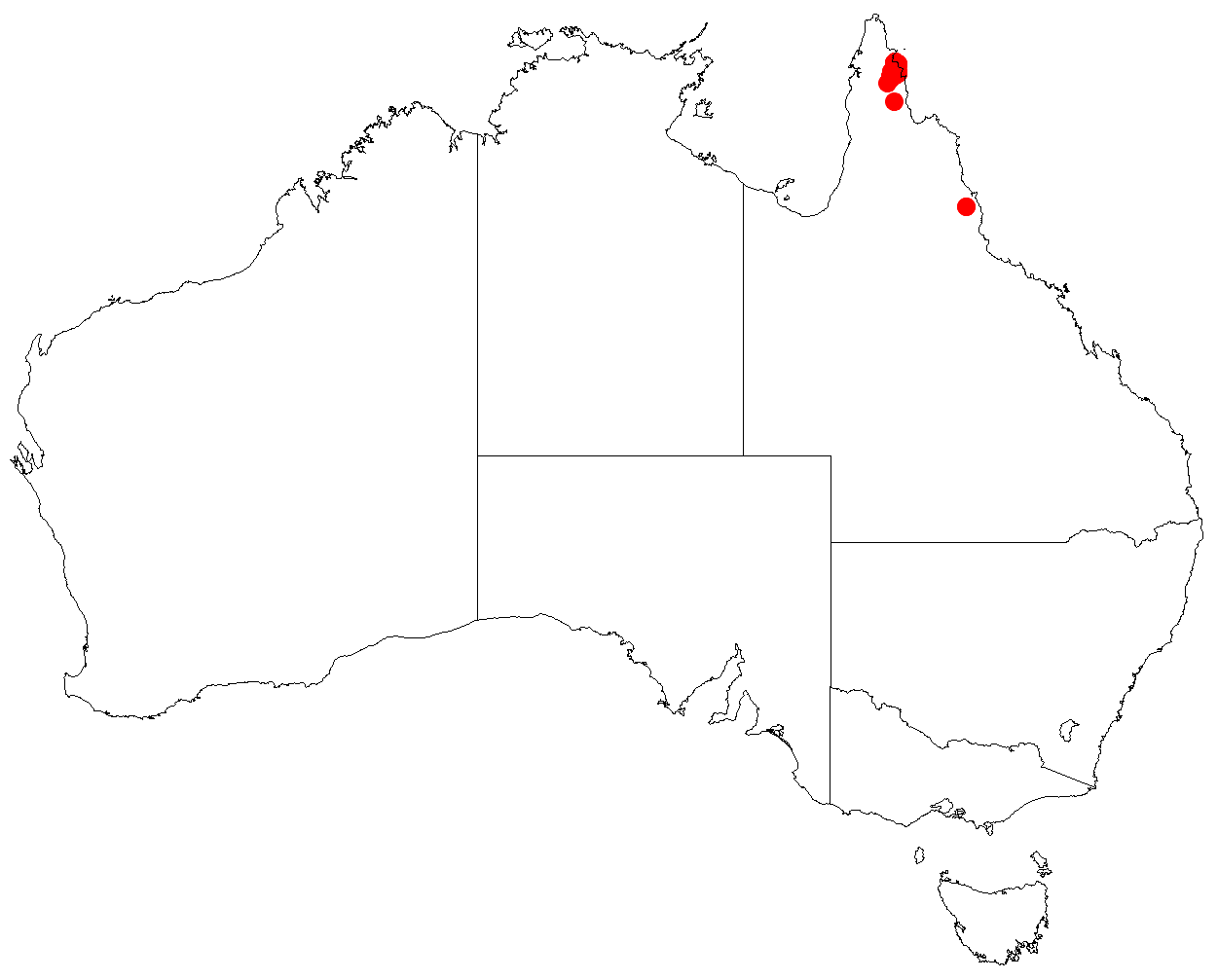
- Occurrence data from AVH

Synonyms
- Leptospermum purpurascens Joy Thomps.

= Aggreflorum purpurascens =

Purple-stemmed turkey bush

Species of shrub

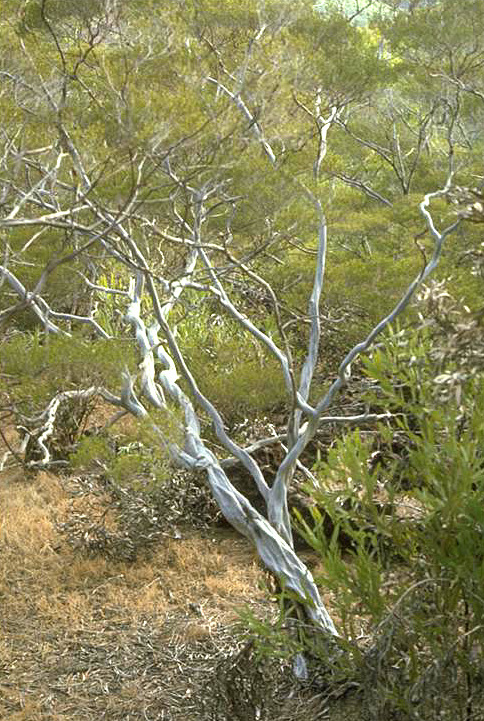
Habit

Aggreflorum purpurascens, commonly known as the purple-stemmed turkey bush, is a shrub or small tree that is endemic to far north Queensland. It has bark that is purple when new, elliptical to broadly lance-shaped leaves, relatively small white flowers arranged in pairs, and small fruit that falls from the plants when the seeds are released.

== Description ==
Aggreflorum purpurascens is a shrub or small tree that typically grows to a height of 6 m (20 ft) with thin, rough bark that is shed annually to reveal shining purple new bark. Younger stems are hairy at first and have a conspicuous flange near each leaf base. The leaves are elliptical to broadly lance-shaped, about 10 mm (0.39 in) long, 2–4 mm (0.079–0.157 in) wide and glossy on the upper surface, silky hairy on the lower surface. The flowers white, sometimes reddish, 3–5 mm (0.12–0.20 in) wide and usually arranged in pairs. The floral cup is hairy, about 1.5 mm (0.059 in) long and the sepals are about 0.7 mm (0.028 in) long. The petals are about 1.5 mm (0.059 in) long and the stamens are 0.5–1 mm (0.020–0.039 in) long. Flowering occurs from June to July and the fruit is a capsule about 3 mm (0.12 in) in diameter with the remains of the sepals attached, but that falls from the plant when the seeds are released.

== Taxonomy and naming ==
This species was first formally described in 1989 by Joy Thompson who gave it the name Leptospermum purpurascens in the journal Telopea. In 2023, Peter Gordon Wilson transferred the species to the genus Aggreflorum as A. purpurascens in the journal Taxon. The specific epithet (purpurascens) is a Latin word meaning "purplish" or "becoming purple", referring to the colour of the new bark.

== Distribution and habitat ==
This tea-tree grows on rocky hillsides in far north Queensland.

== Conservation status ==
This species is classified as "least concern" under the Queensland Government Nature Conservation Act 1992.

== Use in horticulture ==
This species prefers moist, well-drained soil but is frost tender.
