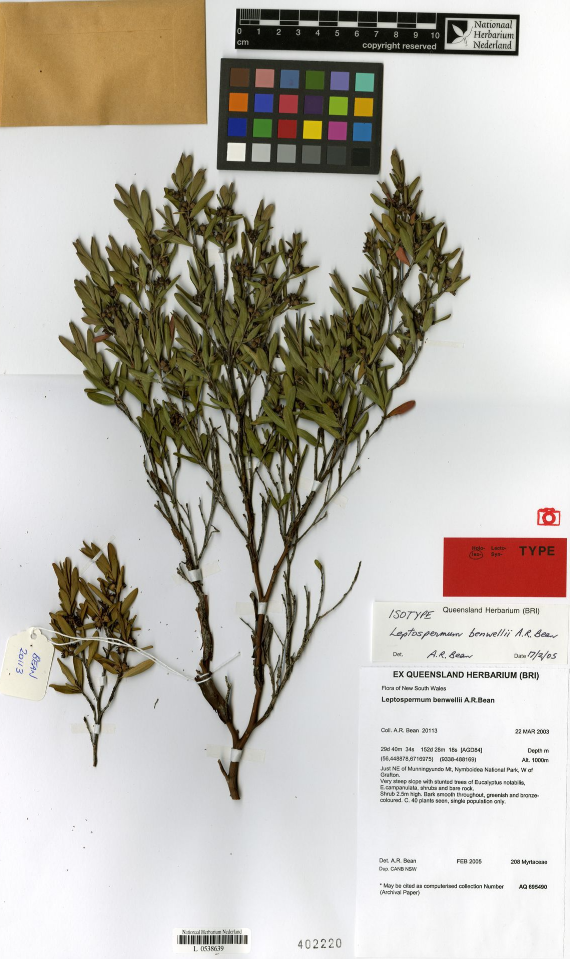
- Type specimen

Scientific classification
- Kingdom: Plantae
- Clade: Tracheophytes
- Clade: Angiosperms
- Clade: Eudicots
- Clade: Rosids
- Order: Myrtales
- Family: Myrtaceae
- Genus: Aggreflorum
- Species: A. benwellii

Binomial name
- Aggreflorum benwellii (A.R.Bean) Peter G.Wilson

Synonyms
- Leptospermum benwellii A.R.Bean

= Aggreflorum benwellii =

Australian species of plant

Aggreflorum benwellii is a species of shrub that is endemic to the Nymboida National Park in New South Wales. It has smooth bark, young branches with conspicuous flanges, narrow elliptical leaves, white flowers and thin-walled, bell-shaped to hemispherical fruit.

== Description ==
Aggreflorum benwellii is a shrub that typically grows to a height of 3 m (9.8 ft) and has smooth bark that is shed annually. Young branchlets are glabrous with conspicuous flanges. The leaves are arranged alternately, more or less sessile, paler on the lower surface, narrow elliptical, 18–25 mm (0.71–0.98 in) long and 2.5–5 mm (0.098–0.197 in) wide. The lower side of young leaves are hairy near their edge. The flowers are borne singly or in groups of up to three in leaf axils on pedicels about 1 mm (0.039 in) long. The sepals are 1–1.5 mm (0.039–0.059 in) long and glabrous apart from soft hairs on the edges. The petals are white, egg-shaped to round, 2.5–3 mm (0.098–0.118 in) long and the stamens are 1.5–2 mm (0.059–0.079 in) long. Flowering has been observed in November and the fruit is a thin-walled, glabrous, bell-shaped to hemispherical capsule about 2.5–3 mm (0.098–0.118 in) long and 4–4.5 mm (0.16–0.18 in) wide.

== Taxonomy and naming ==
This species was first formally described in 2004 by Anthony Bean who gave it the name Leptospermum benwellii in the journal Telopea from specimens he collected near Munningyundo in the Nymboida National Park. In 2023, Peter Gordon Wilson transferred the species to the genus Aggreflorum as A. benwellii in the journal Taxon. The specific epithet (benwellii) honours the botanist Andrew Samuel Benwell.

== Distribution and habitat ==
This species is only known from the type location where it grows in shrubland on steep, rocky slopes.
