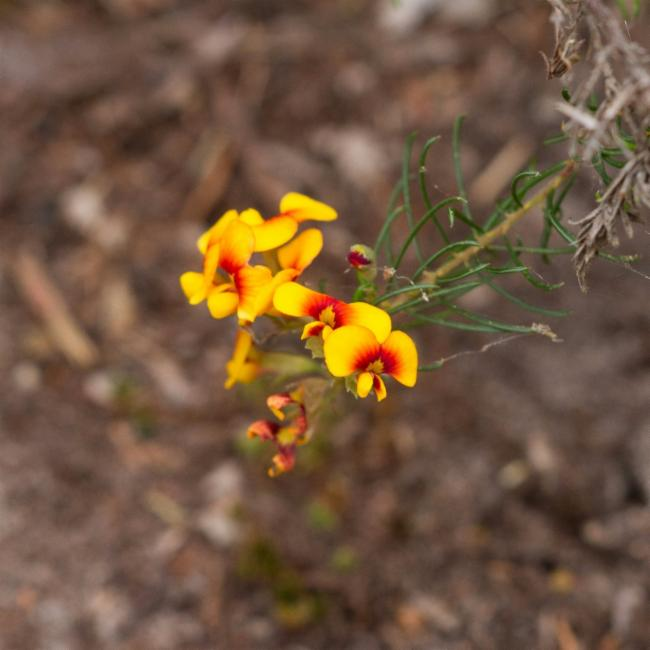
- Near Halls Gap

Scientific classification
- Kingdom: Plantae
- Clade: Tracheophytes
- Clade: Angiosperms
- Clade: Eudicots
- Clade: Rosids
- Order: Fabales
- Family: Fabaceae
- Subfamily: Faboideae
- Genus: Pultenaea
- Species: P. luehmannii

Binomial name
- Pultenaea luehmannii Maiden

= Pultenaea luehmannii =

Thready bush-pea

Species of flowering plant

Pultenaea luehmannii, commonly known as thready bush-pea, is a species of flowering plant in the family Fabaceae and is endemic to the Grampians National Park. It is a diffuse, more or less prostrate sub-shrub with trailing branches, narrow elliptic leaves, and orange and dark brown flowers.

== Description ==
Pultenaea luehmannii is a diffuse, more or less prostrate sub-shrub with slender, glabrous, trailing branches. The leaves are narrow elliptic, 5–17 mm (0.20–0.67 in) long and 1–3 mm (0.039–0.118 in) wide with the edges rolled under. There is an inconspicuous stipules about 1.5 mm (0.059 in) long at the base of the leaves, and pressed against the stem. The flowers are arranged in groups of three to six. The sepals are 4–5 mm (0.16–0.20 in) long and hairy with bracteoles about 2 mm (0.079 in) long attached to the base of the sepal tube. The standard is yellow to orange and 7–8 mm (0.28–0.31 in) long, the wings are yellow and the keel is dark brown. Flowering occurs from October to November and the fruit is an egg-shaped, sparsely hairy pod.

== Taxonomy and naming ==
Pultenaea luehmannii was first formally described in 1905 by Joseph Maiden in The Victorian Naturalist from specimens collected in 1904 in the Grampians National Park by Herbert Williamson. The specific epithet (luehmannii) honours Johann George Luehmann.

== Distribution and habitat ==
Thready push-pea grows in wet heath and on the edges of swamps and streams in the Grampians National Park in south-western Victoria.
