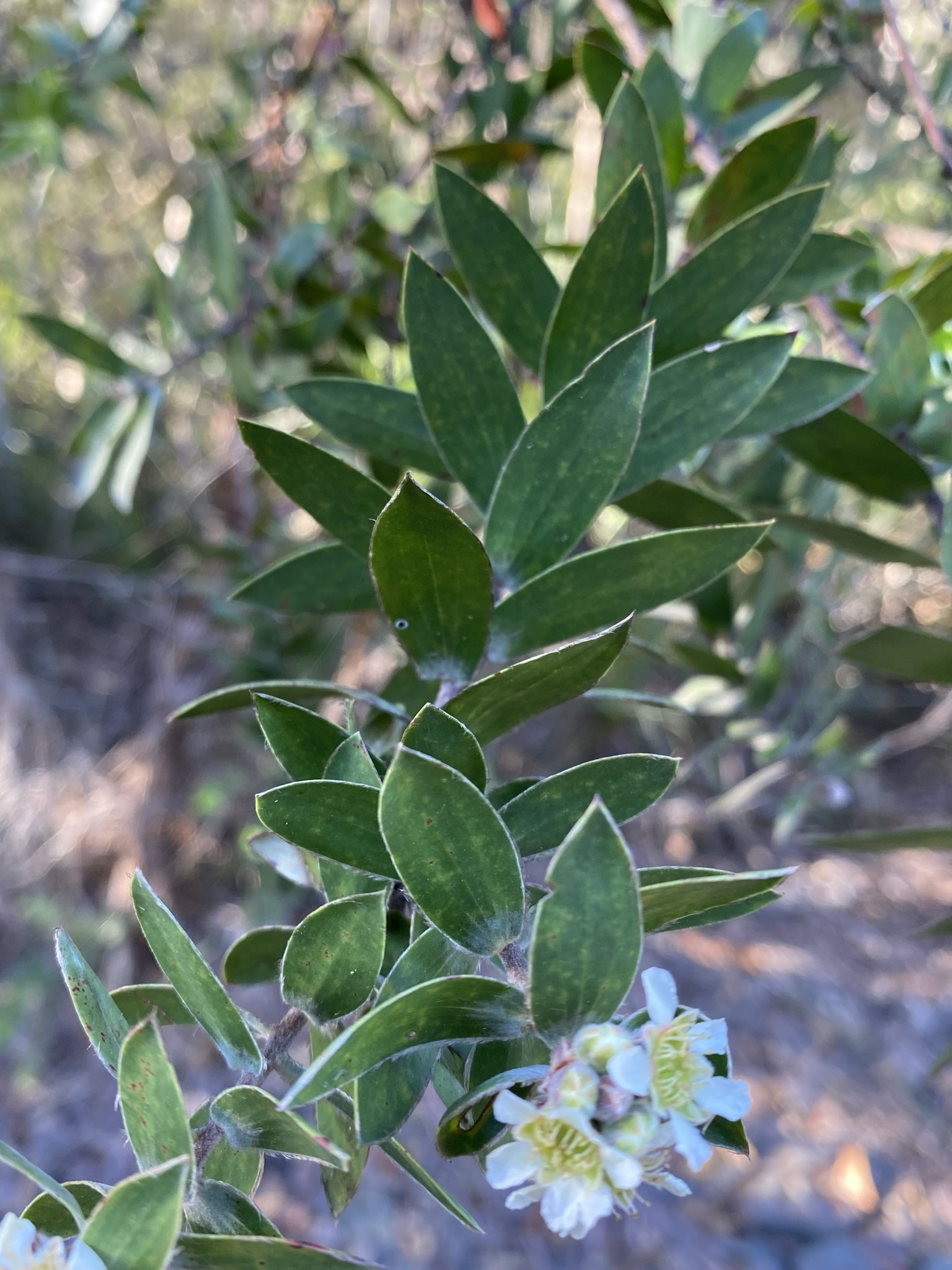
- In Palmview Conservation Park

Scientific classification
- Kingdom: Plantae
- Clade: Tracheophytes
- Clade: Angiosperms
- Clade: Eudicots
- Clade: Rosids
- Order: Myrtales
- Family: Myrtaceae
- Genus: Aggreflorum
- Species: A. speciosum

Binomial name
- Aggreflorum speciosum (Schauer) Peter G.Wilson

Synonyms
- Agonis speciosa (Schauer) C.T.White; Leptospermum speciosum Schauer; Melaleuca leucadendra var. speciosa (Schauer) Domin; Agonis scortechiniana F.Muell.

= Aggreflorum speciosum =

Species of shrub

Aggreflorum speciosum is a species of flowering plant in the myrtle family Myrtaceaeshrub, and is endemic to eastern Australia. It has pale bark that is shed in strips, broadly lance-shaped to elliptical leaves, white flowers arranged singly or in groups of up to three in leaf axils, and small, woody fruit that falls off when mature.

== Description ==
Aggreflorum speciosum is a shrub that typically grows to a height of 1–3 m (3 ft 3 in – 9 ft 10 in) but sometimes a tree to 5–6 m (16–20 ft). It has pale bark that is shed in strips, the younger stems covered with fine hairs. The leaves are lance-shaped to elliptical, mostly 20–30 mm (0.79–1.18 in) long and 5–10 mm (0.20–0.39 in) wide with the base almost stem-clasping. The flowers are white, borne singly or in groups of three and are about 8–10 mm (0.31–0.39 in) wide. The floral cup is covered with soft hairs and about 3 mm (0.12 in) long, tapering to a very short pedicel. The sepals are egg-shaped to triangular, about 1.5 mm (0.059 in) long, the petals 3–4 mm (0.12–0.16 in) long and the stamens about 1.5 mm (0.059 in) long. Flowering mainly occurs in August and September and the fruit is a woody capsule about 5 mm (0.20 in) in diameter with the remains of the sepals attached, but that falls off when mature.

== Taxonomy ==
This species was first formally described in 1843 by Johannes Conrad Schauer who gave it the name Leptospermum speciosum in Walper's book Repertorium Botanices Systematicae. In 2023, Peter Gordon Wilson transferred the species to the genus Aggreflorum as A. speciosum in the journal Taxon. The specific epithet (speciosum) is a Latin word meaning "showy" or "splendid".

== Distribution and habitat ==
Aggreflorum speciosum grows in heath in coastal swamps south from Fraser Island in Queensland to near the Clarence River in New South Wales.
