= Johann George Luehmann =

Australian botanist (1843–1904)

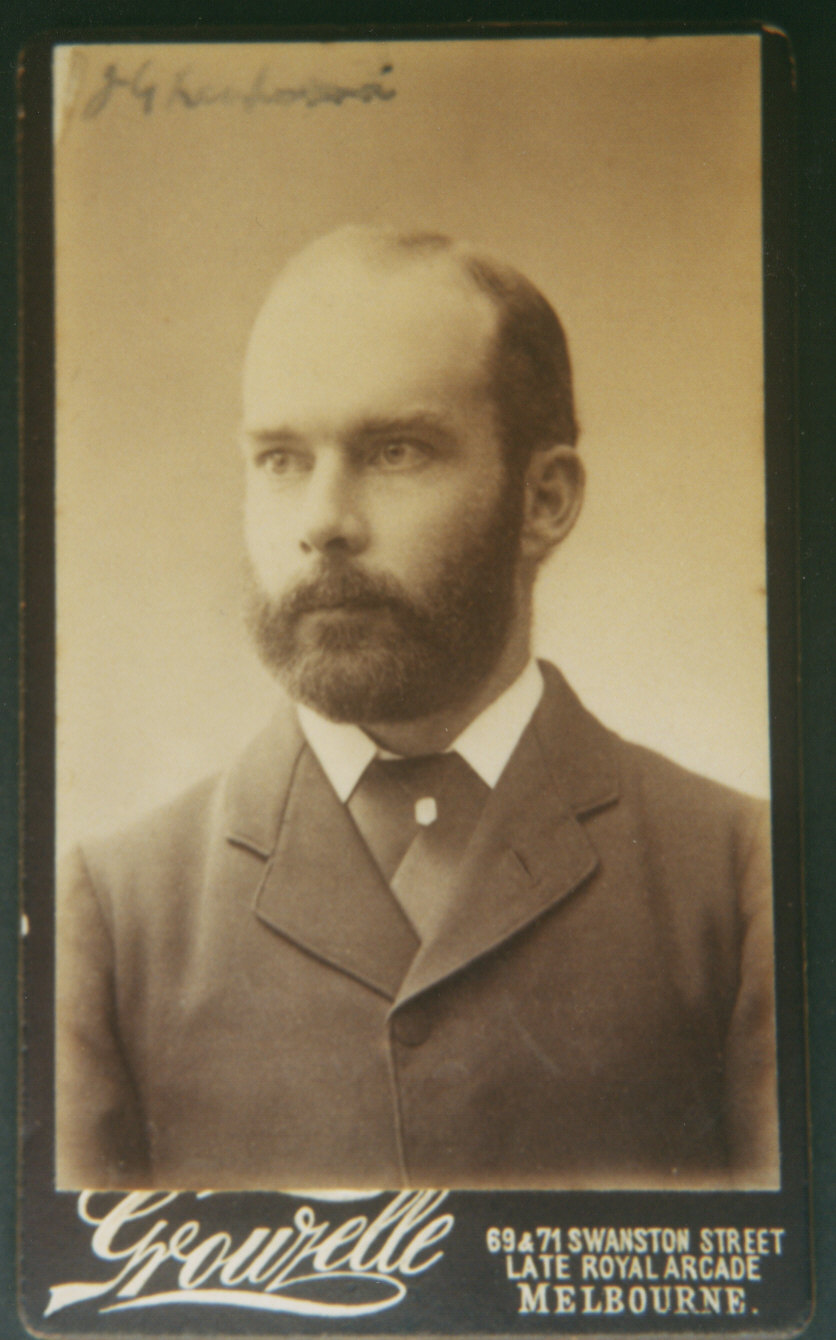
- Johann George Luehmann (c.1880)
- Born: Johann Georg Lühmann; May 12, 1843; Ostmoorende, Prussia (now Moorende, Jork, Germany)
- Died: November 18, 1904 (aged 61); South Yarra, Victoria, Australia
- Resting place: Melbourne General Cemetery
- Spouse(s): Flora Winifred Tivey (1854-1882) (m. June 1881); Maude Isolene Isabel Merchant (1865-1957) (m. 1891)
- Parent(s): Johann Christian Lühmann (father); Anna Lohmann (mother)
- Awards: Fellow, Linnean Society
- Scientific career
- Fields: Botany
- Institutions: National Herbarium of Victoria
- Author abbrev. (botany): Luehm.

Signature
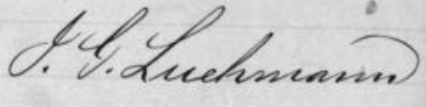

Johann George Luehmann (12 May 1843 – 18 November 1904) was an Australian botanist, who served as the Assistant Botanist and, later, as the Curator at the National Herbarium of Victoria, and who also, from 1896, served as the Government Botanist of Victoria.

== Family ==
The son of Johann Christian Lühmann (1818-1890), and Anna Lühmann (1826-), née Lohmann, Johann Georg Lühmann was born in Ostmoorende, Prussia (now Moorende, Jork, Germany) on 12 May 1843.

He married Flora Winifred "Dora" Tivey (1854-1882) on 4 June 1881. Flora died on 20 January 1882, one week after delivering a stillborn daughter (on 13 January 1822).

He married Maude Isolene Isabel Merchant (1865-1957) at South Yarra on 16 September 1891. They had five children.

== Australia ==
=== 1863 ===
Luehmann emigrated to Australia in 1863, arriving in Melbourne in the White Star ship Queen of the South on 8 August 1863.

He was one of a number of influential German-speaking residents — such as Ludwig Becker, Hermann Beckler, William Blandowski, Amalie Dietrich, Wilhelm Haacke, Diedrich Henne, Gerard Krefft, Johann Menge, Carl Mücke (a.k.a. Muecke), Ludwig Preiss, Carl Ludwig Christian Rümker (a.k.a. Ruemker), Moritz Richard Schomburgk, Richard Wolfgang Semon, Karl Theodor Staiger, George Ulrich, Eugene von Guérard, Robert von Lendenfeld, Ferdinand von Mueller, Georg von Neumayer, and Carl Wilhelmi — who brought their "epistemic traditions" to Australia, and not only became "deeply entangled with the Australian colonial project", but also were "intricately involved in imagining, knowing and shaping colonial Australia" (Barrett, et al., 2018, p.2). In 1895 he was the president of "The German Club of Victoria" (Deutschen Vereins von Victoria).

=== Assistant Botanist: National Herbarium of Victoria ===
In 1867, following the resignation of von Mueller's secretary, Ernst Bernard Heyne, Luehmann was appointed as the assistant to Ferdinand von Mueller at the National Herbarium of Victoria in Melbourne; and remained in the position until 1896.

=== Field Naturalists Club of Victoria ===
He was a foundation member (on 17 May 1880) of the Field Naturalists Club of Victoria, and served as its vice-president from 1899 to 1901.

=== Curator: National Herbarium of Victoria ===
Leuhmann was appointed Curator of the National Herbarium of Victoria following the death of Ferdinand von Mueller on 10 October 1896.

=== Government Botanist of Victoria ===
A short time after von Mueller's death, Luehmann was appointed Victorian Government Botanist.

== Publications ==
- Reliquiæ Muellerianæ: Descriptions of New Australian Plants in the Melbourne Herbarium, The Victorian Naturalist (1896-1897):
  - Luehmann, J.G., (1896a), "Acacia tysonii, (Luehmann)", The Victorian Naturalist, Vol.13, No.8, (November 1896), pp.111-112.
  - Luehmann, J.G., (1896b), "Acacia cuthbertsonii, (Luehmann)", and "Acacia palustris, (Luehmann)", The Victorian Naturalist, Vol.13, No.9, (December 1896), pp.117.
  - Luehmann, J.G., (1897a), "Eucalyptus torquata, (Luehmann)", The Victorian Naturalist, Vol.13, No.11, (February 1897), pp.117.
  - Luehmann, J.G., (1897b), "Eucalyptus corrugata, (Luehmann)", The Victorian Naturalist, Vol.13, No.12, (March-April 1897), pp.168.
- Luehmann, J.G. (1898a), A Short Dichotomous Key to the Hitherto Known Species of Eucalyptus, Melbourne: Australasian Association for the Advancement of Science.
- Luehmann, J.G. (1898b), "Observations on Xerotes sororia, (F. v. Mueller)", The Victorian Naturalist, Vol.14, No.10, (10 February 1898), pp.147-148.
- Luehmann, J.G. (1898c), "Description of a new Australian labiate plant (Hemigenia macphersoni, (Luehmann))", The Victorian Naturalist, Vol.15, No.2, (9 June 1898), p.20.
- Luehmann, J.G. (1898d), "Some Observations on Pre-Linnean Botanists", The Victorian Naturalist, Vol.15, No.5, (8 September 1898), pp.50-58.
- Luehmann, J.G. (1901), "Description of a New Lobelia from Western Australia (Lobelia toppii, (Luehmann))", The Victorian Naturalist, Vol.17, No.9, (10 January 1901), p.169.

== Death ==
He died, after a short illness, at his South Yarra residence on 18 November 1904, and was buried at the Melbourne General Cemetery on 19 November 1904.

== Legacy ==
=== Luehmann Street ===
Luehmann Street, one of the original streets in Page, Australian Capital Territory was named after him in 1969.

=== Species ===
Species named in his honour include:

- Acacia luehmannii, (F.Muell)
- Bassia luehmannii, (F.Muell)
- Casuarina luehmannii, (R.T. Baker, 1900)
- Darwinia luehmannii, (F.Muell. & Tate, 1896)
- Eucalyptus luehmanniana, (F.Muell., 1878)
- Leptospermum luehmannii, (Bailey, 1900)
- Phyllota luehmannii, (F.Muell.)
- Pultenaea luehmannii, (Maiden, 1905)
- Rhodobryum luehmannianum, (Müll. Hal.)
- Stipa luehmannii, (Reader)
- Syzygium luehmannii, (F.Muell.)
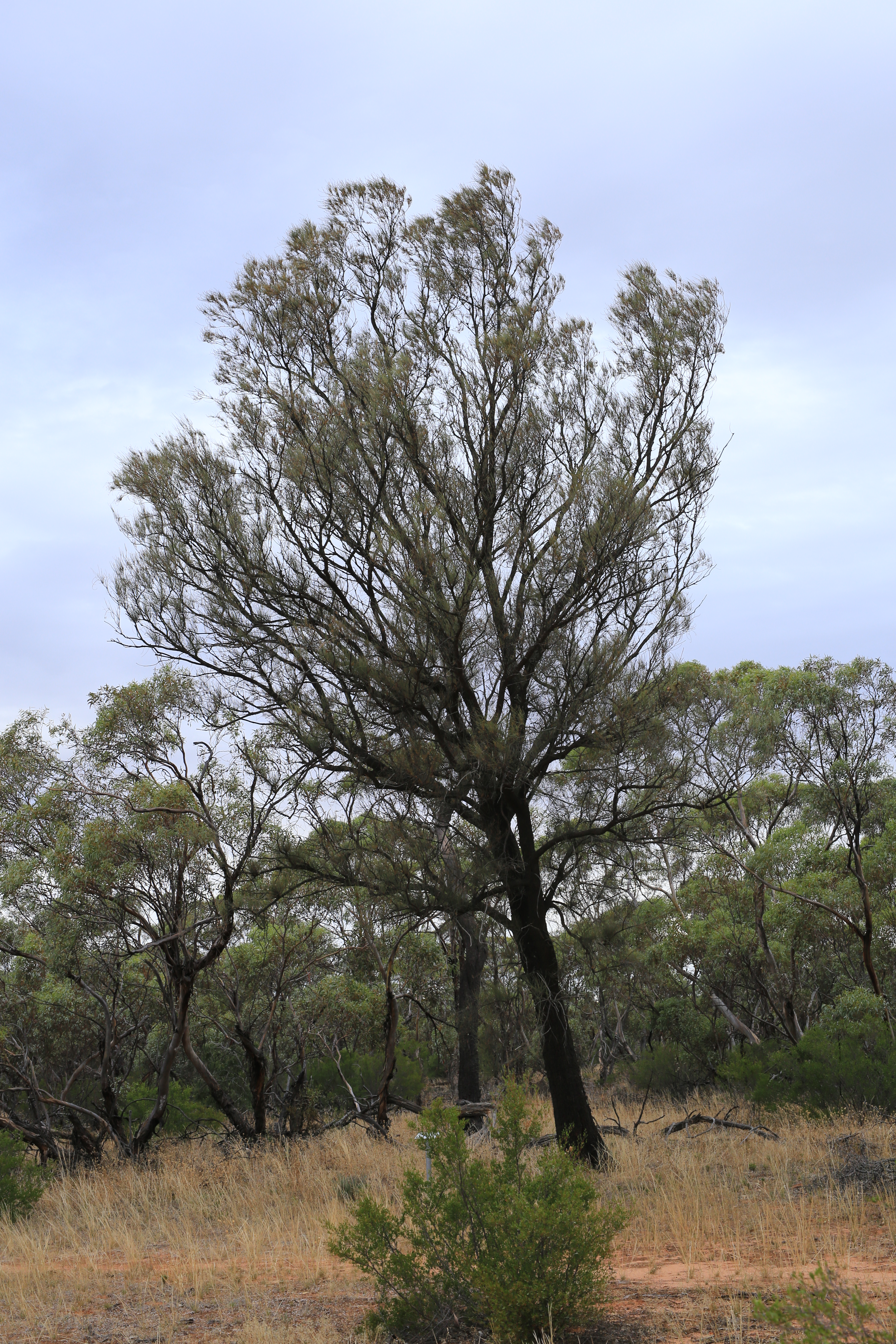
Casuarina luehmannii.

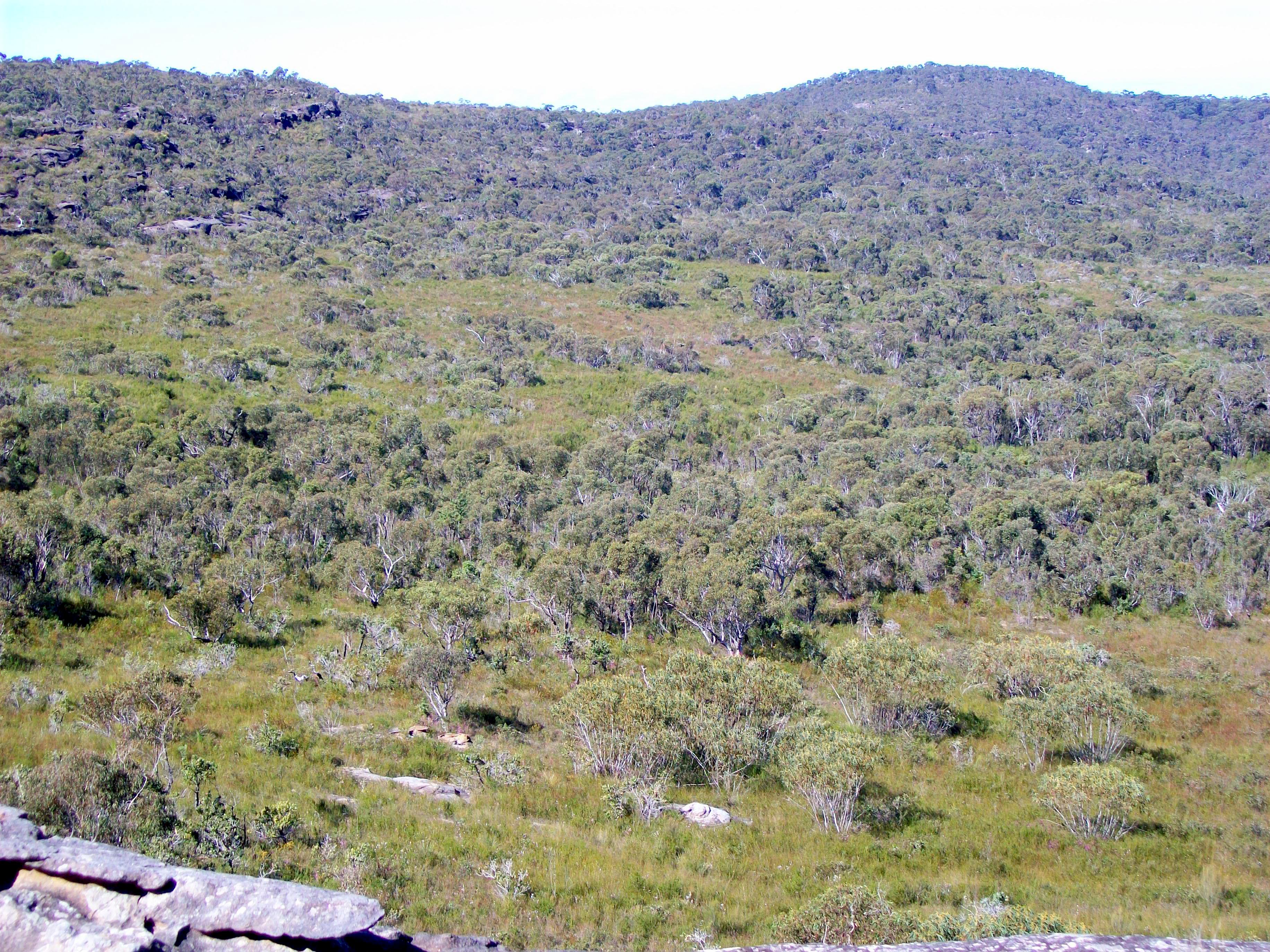
Eucalyptus luehmanniana.

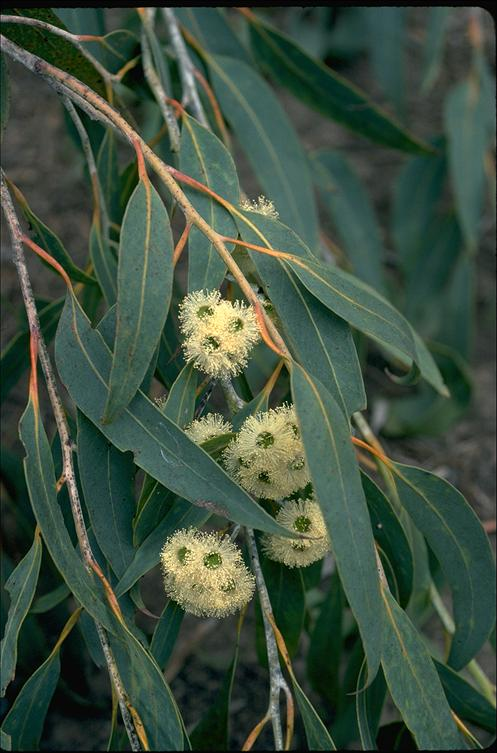
Eucalyptus luehmanniana.

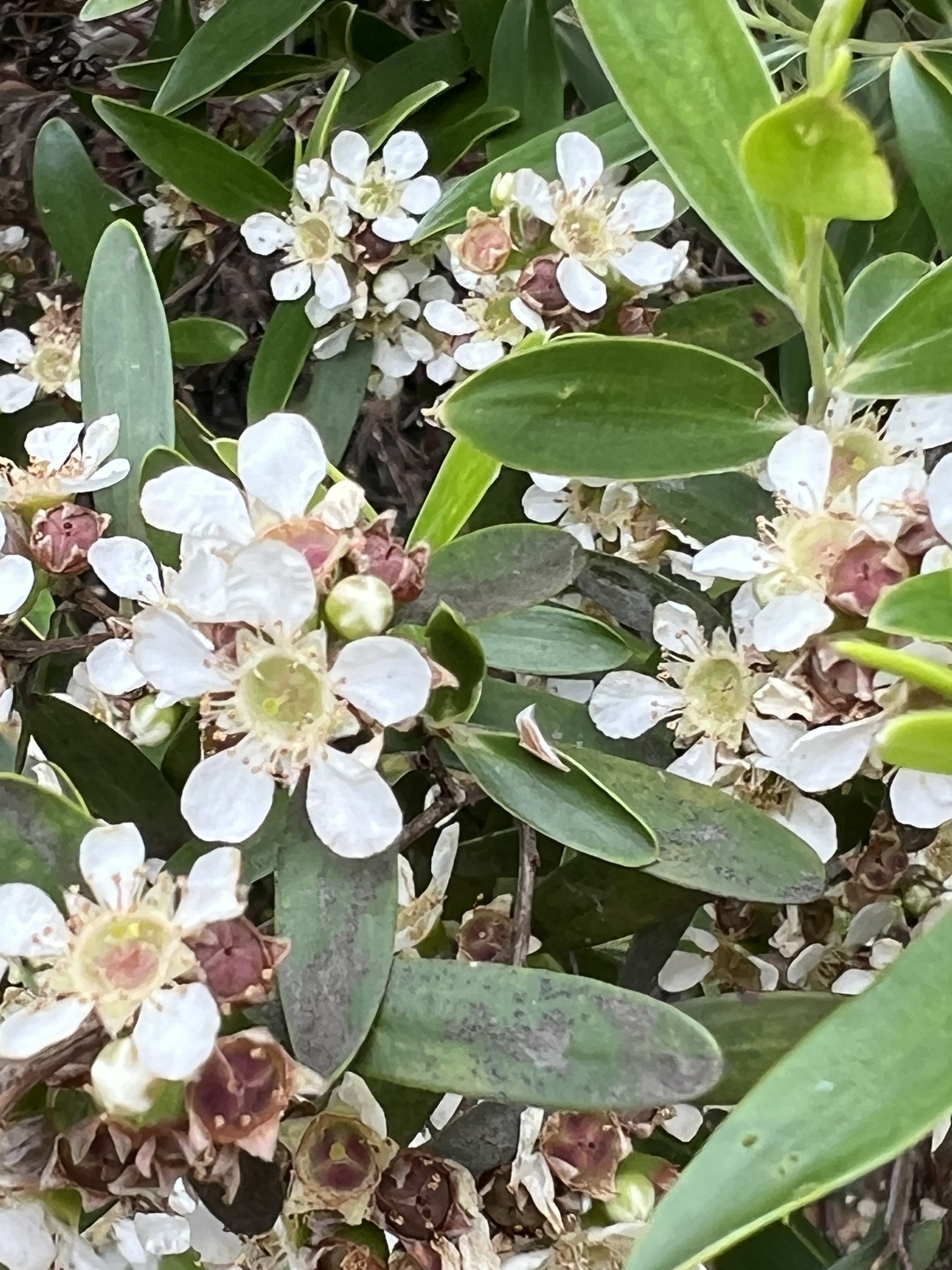
Leptospermum luehmannii.

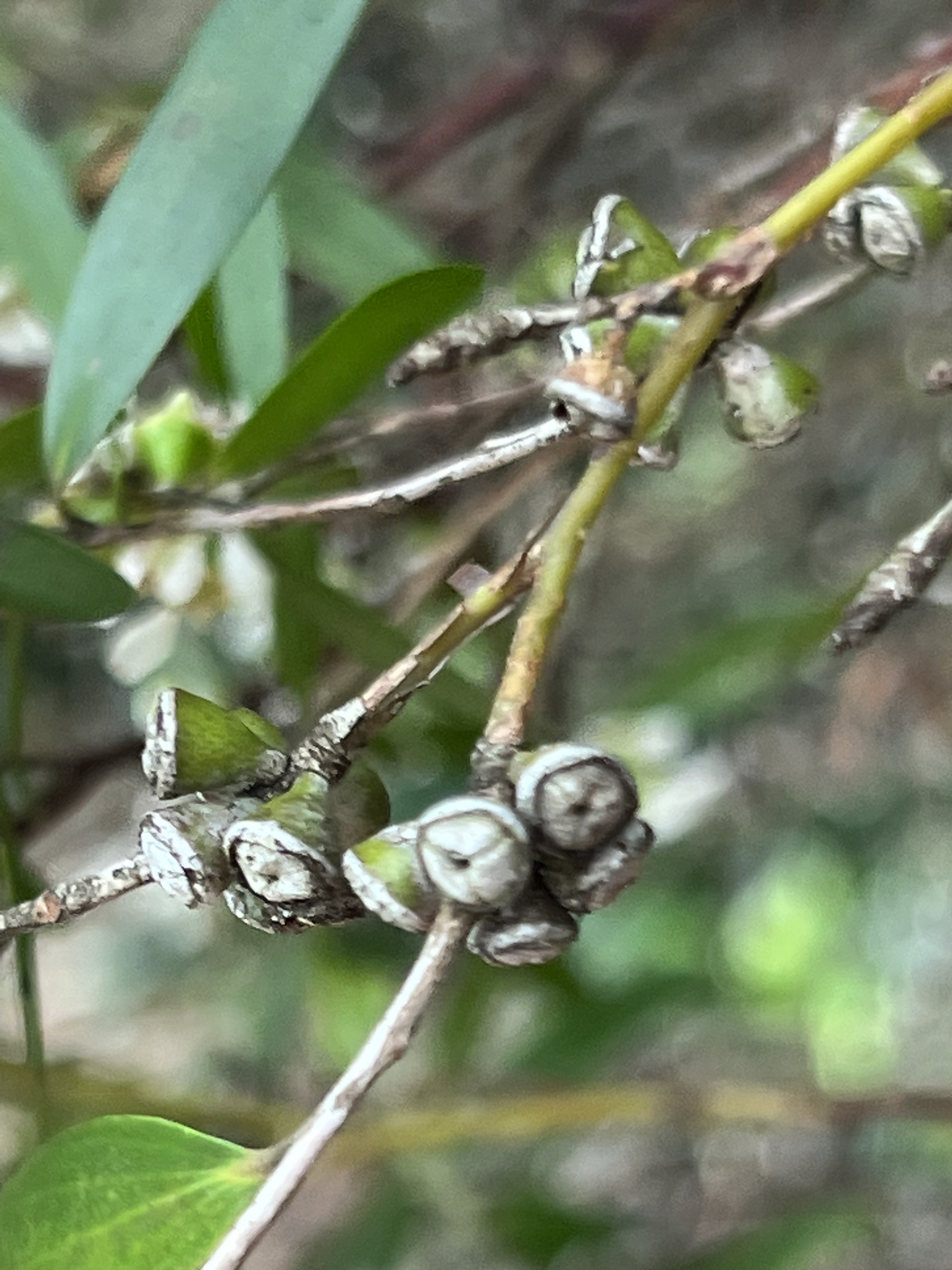
Leptospermum luehmannii.

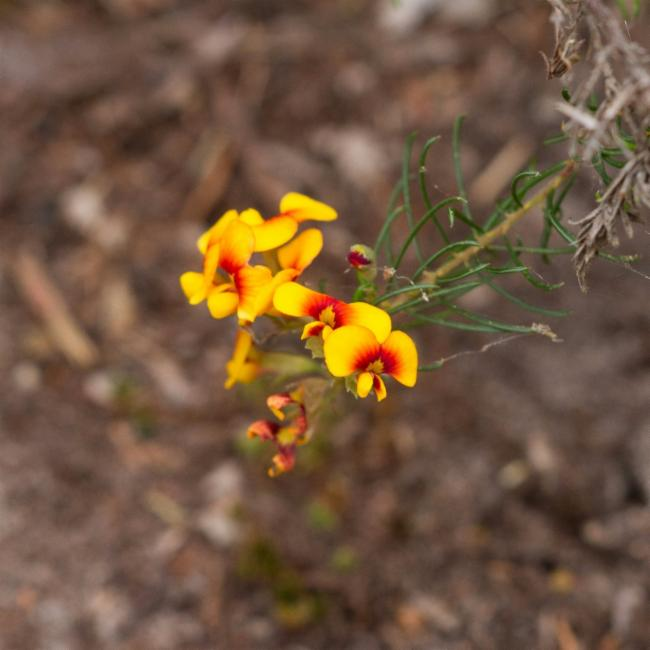
Pultenaea luehmannii.

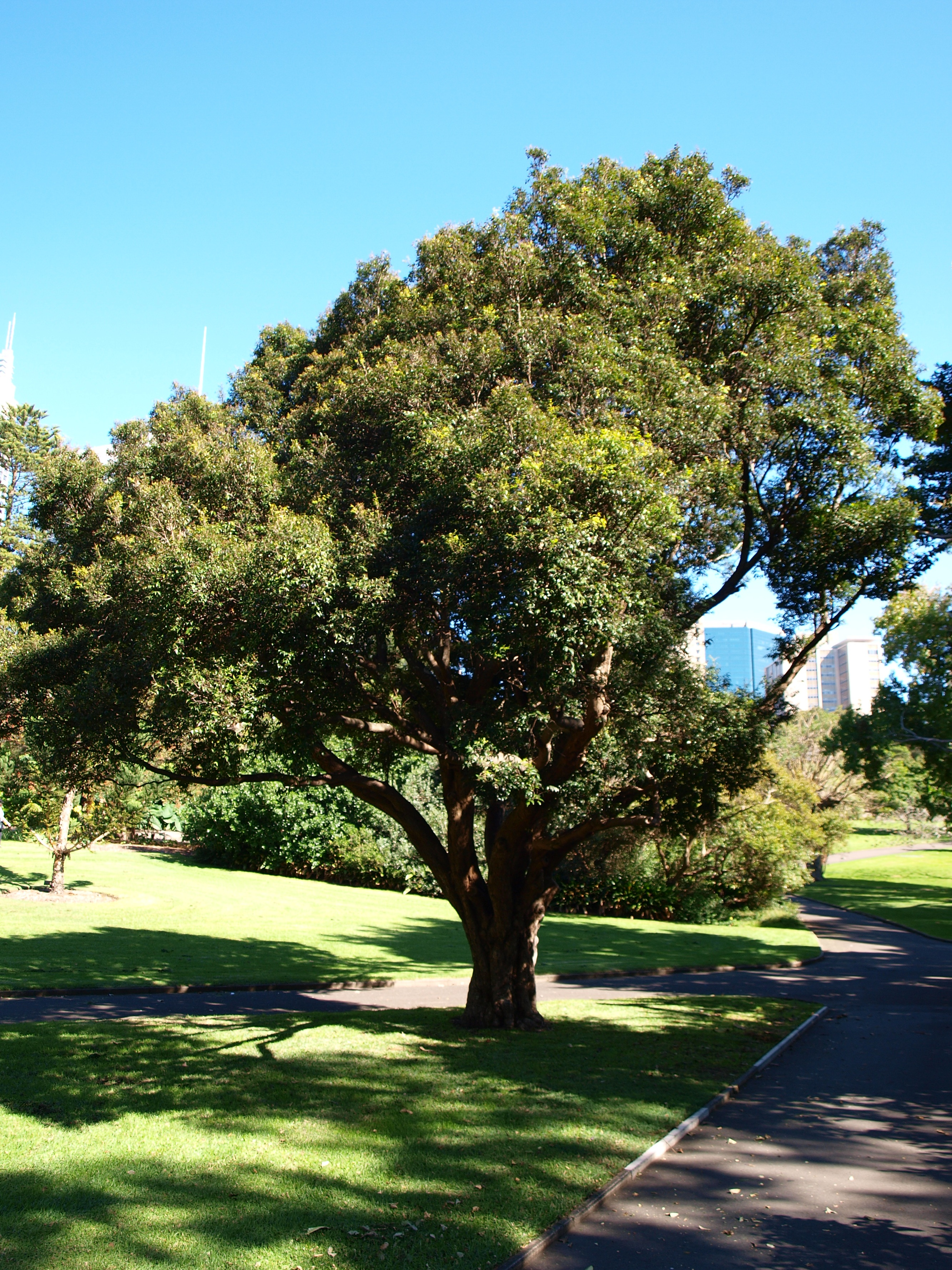
Syzygium luehmannii.

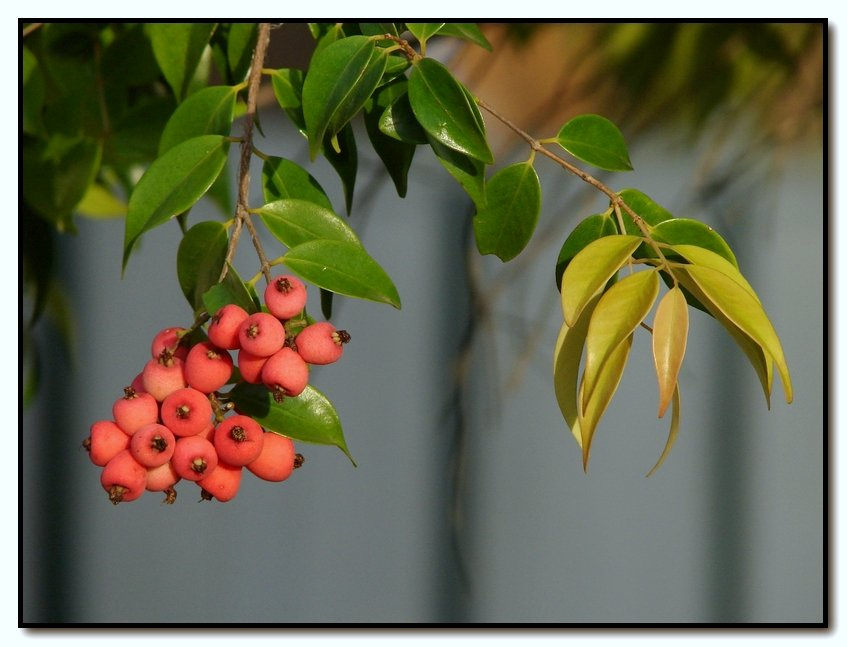
Syzygium luehmannii.
