= William Douglas Francis =

Australian botanist (1889–1959)

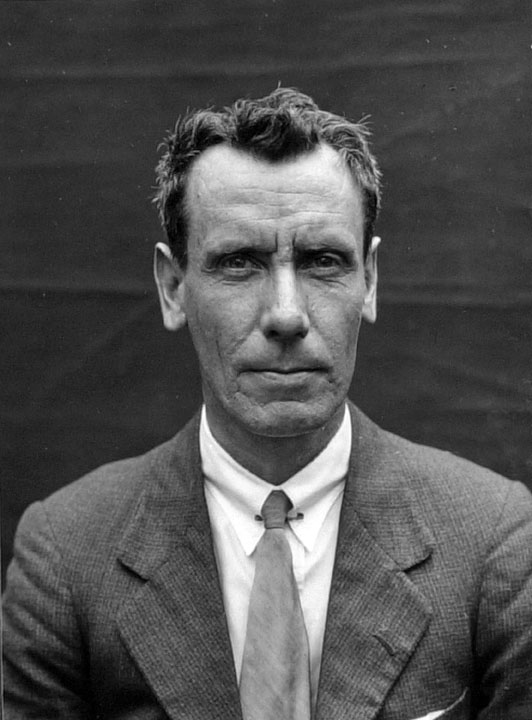
William Douglas Francis

William Douglas Francis (6 March 1889 – 2 January 1959) was an Australian botanist.

Born in Bega, New South Wales, at the age of 17 he moved with his father Alfred and brother Frederick from Wollongong, where he was attending Wollongong Superior Public School, to Kin Kin in Queensland. It was here that he was able to satisfy his strong interest in natural history while helping his father and brother on the farm. In 1908 he qualified as a milk and cream tester in Queensland.

In 1919 he was appointed Assistant Government Botanist at the Queensland Herbarium. By 1950 he was appointed Government Botanist. He retired in 1954 and died five years later. He contributed enormously to the classification and identification of Australian rainforest species and is probably best remembered for his book Australian Rainforest Trees. First published in 1929, it has since gone through numerous reprints. An arboretum established at Kin Kin in the 1990s is dedicated to his memory.
