= Edwin Brown (naturalist) =

English naturalist (died 1876)

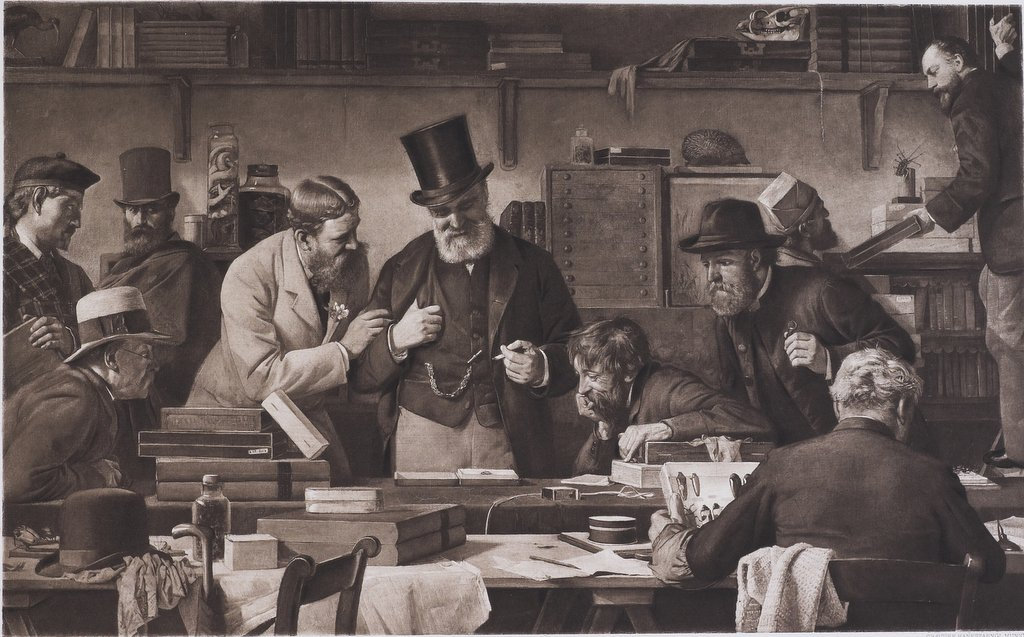
The sale of Edwin Brown's insect collection

Edwin Brown (died 1 September 1876, Tenby) was an English naturalist and entomologist.

Edwin Brown was manager of the Burton, Uttoxeter & Ashbourne Union Bank in Burton on Trent. He had a private museum of geological, zoological and botanical specimens, and a library of taxonomic works. Brown was a Member of the Entomological Society of London from 1849. He specialised in Carabidae and Cicindelidae.

Parts of his collection were purchased by Oxford University Museum of Natural History when it was sold at auction in March 1877. The purchase included insects collected by Alfred Russel Wallace.

Edwin Brown was Henry Walter Bates's first naturalist friend.

== Works ==
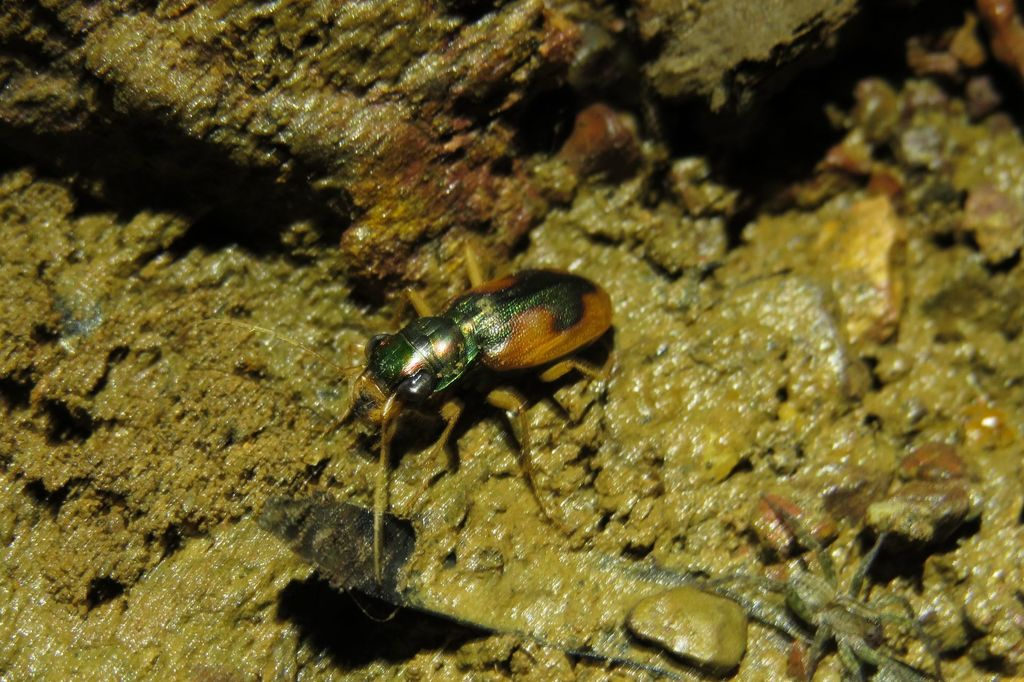
Brown worked on Australian tiger beetles, including Pseudotetracha [Tetracha] australasiae

- Contributions to Mosley, Oswald's Natural History of Tutbury (1863)
- Brown, Edwin (1869). "XXII. On the Australian species of Tetracha". Transactions of the Royal Entomological Society of London. 17 (4): 351–353. doi:10.1111/j.1365-2311.1869.tb01110.x.
