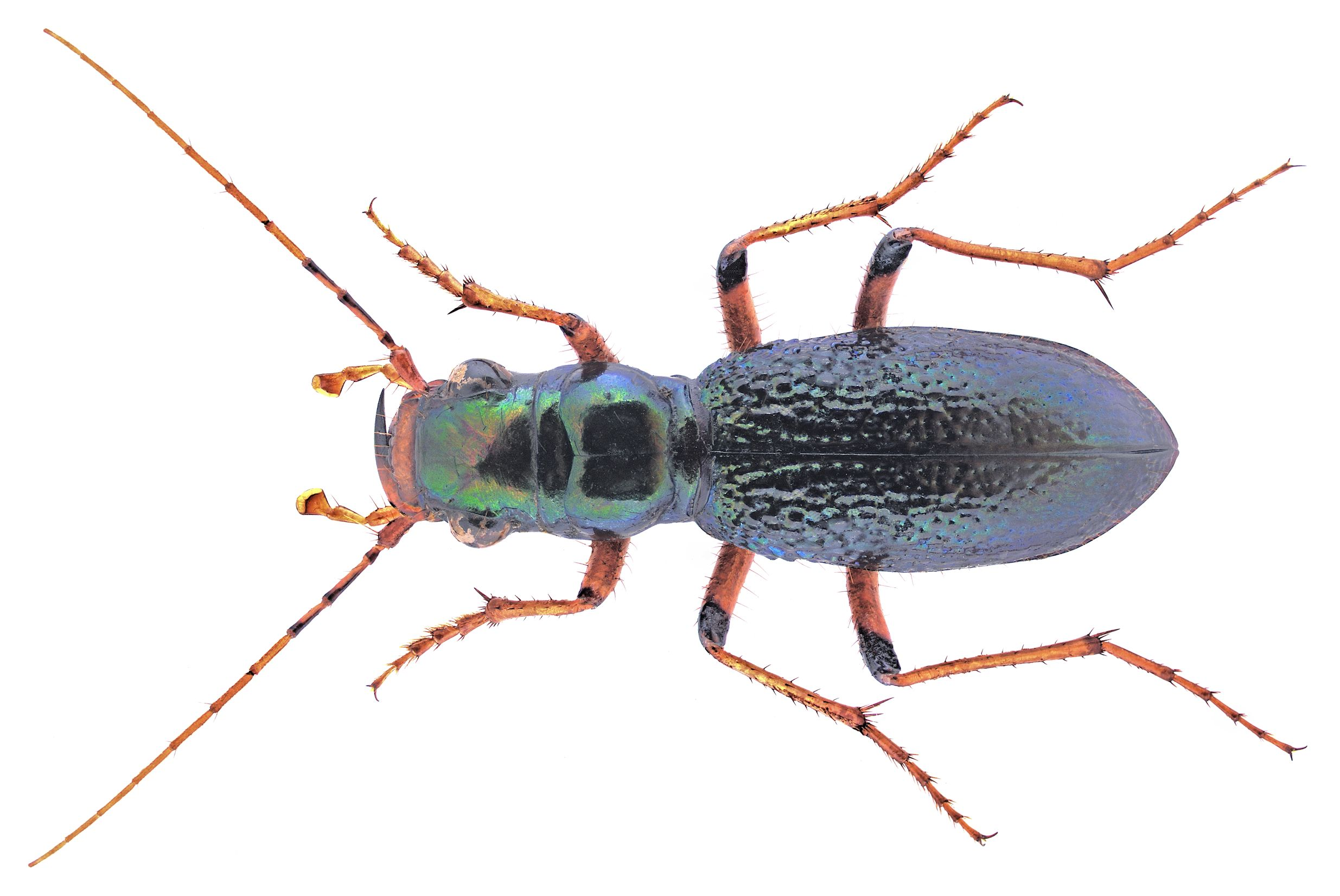

Scientific classification
- Domain: Eukaryota
- Kingdom: Animalia
- Phylum: Arthropoda
- Class: Insecta
- Order: Coleoptera
- Suborder: Adephaga
- Family: Cicindelidae
- Genus: Megacephala
- Species: M. regalis

Binomial name
- Megacephala regalis Boheman, 1848

Synonyms
- Megacephala excelsa Bates, 1874; Megacephala revoili Lucas, 1881; Megacephala herero Péringuey, 1892; Megacephala angulicollis Kolbe, 1892; Megacephala excisa Fairmaire, 1894 (missp.); Megacephala oberthueri Fairmaire, 1894; Megacephala bennigseni W. Horn, 1896; Megacephala neumanni Kolbe, 1897; Megacephala hauseri W. Horn, 1898; Megacephala peringueyi W. Horn, 1898; Megacephala oscari W. Horn, 1904; Megacephala regalis sebakuana Péringuey, 1904; Megacephala baby W. Horn, 1905; Megacephala citernii W. Horn, 1912; Megacephala oskari W. Horn, 1926 (Missp.); Megacephala atrospinosa W. Horn, 1931; Megacephala serratosetosa W. Horn, 1932; Megacephala regalis desaegeri Basilewsky, 1950; Megacephala regalis katangana Basilewsky, 1950; Megacephala regalis naivashae Basilewsky, 1962; Megacephala regalis angolana Basilewsky, 1966; Megacephala regalis babaulti Basilewsky, 1966; Megacephala regalis vansoni Basilewsky, 1966; Megacephala regalis viridissima Basilewsky, 1966; Megacephala regalis xerophila Basilewsky, 1966; Megacephala regalis bivari Serrano, 1996

= Megacephala regalis =

Species of beetle

Megacephala regalis is a species of tiger beetle in the subfamily Cicindelinae that was described by Boheman in 1848, and has had many putative subspecies named.
