= Pseudotetracha howittii =

Scientific classification
- Kingdom: Animalia
- Phylum: Arthropoda
- Clade: Pancrustacea
- Class: Insecta
- Order: Coleoptera
- Suborder: Adephaga
- Family: Cicindelidae
- Genus: Pseudotetracha
- Species: P. howittii

Binomial name
- Pseudotetracha howittii (Laporte, 1867)

Synonyms
- Tetracha howittii Laporte, 1867 Megacephala howittii (Laporte, 1867)

Species of beetle

Pseudotetracha howittii is a species of tiger beetle in the subfamily Cicindelinae that was described by Laporte in 1867, and is endemic to Australia.
