= Fred Williams (artist) =

Australian painter and printmaker

- Fred Williams in front of Gorge landscape (oil on canvas, 1981) from the Pilbara series (photo by Rennie Ellis, 1981)
- Born: Frederick Ronald Williams; 23 January 1927; Richmond, Victoria, Australia
- Died: 22 April 1982 (aged 55); Hawthorn, Victoria, Australia
- Education: National Gallery School, Melbourne; Chelsea School of Art, London; Central School of Arts and Crafts, London
- Known for: Painting, Printmaking
- Notable work: Pilbara series (1979–81)
- Awards: Officer of the Order of the British Empire (OBE)

Frederick Ronald Williams (23 January 1927 – 22 April 1982) was an Australian painter and printmaker. He was one of Australia's most important artists, and one of the twentieth century's major landscapists. He had more than seventy solo exhibitions during his career in Australian galleries, as well as the exhibition Fred Williams - Landscapes of a Continent at the Museum of Modern Art in New York in 1977.

== Early life and education ==
Fred Williams was born on 23 January 1927 in Richmond, a suburb of Melbourne, Victoria, Australia, the son of an electrical engineer and a Richmond housewife. Williams left school at 14 and was apprenticed to a firm of Melbourne shopfitters and box makers. From 1943 to 1947, he studied at the National Gallery School, Melbourne, at first part-time and then full-time from 1945 at the age of 18. The Gallery School was traditional and academic, with a long and prestigious history. He also began lessons under George Bell the following year, who had his own art school in Melbourne. This continued until 1950. Bell was a conservative modern artist but a very influential teacher.

Between 1952 and 1956, Williams studied part-time at the Chelsea School of Art, London (now Chelsea College of Art and Design) and in 1954 he did an etching course at the Central School of Arts and Crafts. He lived in a South Kensington bedsit and subsidised his art practice by working part-time at Savage's picture framers. Williams returned to Melbourne in 1956, when his family was able to send him a cheap ticket aboard a ship bringing visitors to the Melbourne Olympics.

He had work included in the 'Recent Australian Painting' exhibition at the Whitechapel Gallery, London, and 'Australian Painting: Colonial, Impressionism, Modern' at the Tate Gallery.

== Work ==
After mainly working with figures in early paintings and etchings, he began painting landscapes after returning to Melbourne in 1957, which remained the major theme in his art.

While learning etching and printing in London, he produced vivid caricatured sketches of contemporary London life. It was during this period that he established his method of reworking the same motif a number of times in a number of mediums and very often over a number of years.

As an artist concerned with form over subjectivity, Williams' approach struck a jarring note against the unity of many of his close associates such as John Brack, Arthur Boyd and Charles Blackman, the authors of the famous ‘Antipodean’ manifesto of 1959. Williams' work was excluded from their major exhibition. As heirs to the expressionist tradition, the Antipodeans lauded a spontaneous, improvised approach to painting and saw the function of art as vested in its expressive potential. They had little time for - and, in fact, denounced - the 'new' art emerging from Europe, the influences which were increasingly informing Williams' development.

On his return to Australia, Williams saw the aesthetic potential of the Australian bush in its inherent plasticity. His interest in finding an aesthetic 'language' with which to express the very un-European Australian landscape. This was grounded in establishing a pictorial equivalent to the overwhelmingly vast, primarily flat landscape, in which the traditional European relationship of foreground to background breaks down, necessitating a complete re-imagining of compositional space. In this, Williams looked to the approach taken by Australian Aboriginal artists.

He did this by tilting the landscape up against the picture plane, so that frequently the only indicator of horizontal recession is the presence of a horizon line, or where clumps of trees huddle closer together towards the horizon, suggesting recession. Where no horizon is visible, the landscape runs fully parallel to the picture plane, as in the major You Yangs series of the mid-1960s. Here, calligraphic knots of pigment indicate the presence of single trees against the earth, as if seen from the air (example).

Williams' first Australian landscape series was based on the Nattai River (1957–58).

Williams' landscapes recorded the passage of the Yarra River from its source to its mouth.

In 1960, Williams was invited to enter for the Helena Rubenstein Travelling Art Scholarship, the richest and most prestigious art prize at the time with an award of £1000 plus £300 travel expenses aimed at giving the winner overseas experience. Five paintings were required for his entry and he selected Landscape with a steep road (1957), Landscape with a building I (c. 1957–58), The forest pond (c. 1959–60), Sherbrooke Forest (1960) and The St George River (1960). He won in 1963 and it proved to be a turning point in his career which, according to fellow artist Jan Senbergs, brought Williams wide acclaim, especially from many influential curators and critics. Sydney art dealer Rudy Komon took Williams on as one of his key artists which enabled Williams to discontinue his part-time work with a Melbourne picture-framer and paint full-time.

In 1969, Williams started using a horizontal strip format in his landscape paintings in order to present different aspects of one scene on the same sheet. In 1970, Williams produced a group of four large strip format gouache-on-paper paintings called the West Gate Bridge series showing the half-constructed West Gate Bridge over the Yarra River in Melbourne. A section of the bridge collapsed on 15 October 1970, while it was still under construction, killing thirty-five workers. Williams had planned to paint the length of the river, but his widow, Lyn said he "lost heart in the project" after the accident. In his Beachscape with bathers Queenscliff I-IV series from 1971, Williams painted from the top of a cliff overlooking the beach during a seaside holiday. Each sheet is broken horizontally into four separate strips representing a different time of day and corresponding shift in the colour and tone of the scene as Williams recorded the effects of light on the landscape. By 1971 he had developed the technique extensively, moving from a vertical format to a horizontal format.

In March 1974, Williams travelled to Erith Island in Bass Strait with the historians Stephen Murray-Smith and Ian Turner, and fellow painter Clifton Pugh. Poor weather prevented Williams and his friends from leaving the island when they had intended. When the weather broke Williams painted a number of gouaches, including Beachscape, Erith Island I and II which employ the horizontal strip format. The Beachscape, Erith Island pictures show the point where the sea joins the land depicted as if looking down from above in the form of four strips. Williams recorded the event in his diary from 27 to 28 March 1974, "I do 'strip' paintings of the beach using sand glued on – but the wind has worn me to a 'frazzle' … My final half doz. strip paintings are my best."

In May 1976, while Williams and his wife Lyn were visiting Paris and Bologna, many of Williams's paintings and all gouaches stored at the Barrett Malt Factory in Richmond were damaged by a fire.

In 1976, Williams flew over the Northern Territory at night on his way to an art fair in Bologna, Italy. He saw lines of bushfires burning and later that year produced the twelve-sheeted gouache series, Bushfire in Northern Territory.

In February 1979, Williams visited the Lal Lal Falls on the Moorabool River to the west of Melbourne near Ballarat and painted the Lal Lal polyptych, a four panel painting that he regarded as a single work. The successive canvases of the polyptych depict the changes in light on the waterfall and the surrounding landscape. Williams painted the last of his major landscapes, the four panel Waterfall polyptych (oil on canvas, each 183.0 cm x 152.5 cm), in his studio in 1979 based on the Lal Lal polyptych. He described the studio painting as "a major effort on my part" and it is regarded as one of the most important works of his career. Williams said that his "enthusiasm was fired" by Eugene von Guérard's Waterfall, Strath Creek from 1862.

In the last years of his career, Williams produced more landscape series with strong themes, his last being the Pilbara series (1979–81), which remained intact as it was acquired by Con-Zinc Rio Tinto Group, the mining company that had invited him to explore the arid north-west region of Australia.

== Awards ==
Williams received a Helena Rubinstein Travelling Art Scholarship in 1963. In 1976 he was named an Officer of the Order of the British Empire (OBE), and awarded a Doctorate of Law (Honoris Causa) by Monash University in 1980.

Williams won the Wynne Prize for landscape painting twice; in 1966 with Upwey Landscape and in 1976 with Mt. Kosciusko.

His painting Upwey Landscape (1965) sold for $1,987,700 in one of the final auctions of Christie's in Australia in April 2006, which at the time was the second highest price for any work sold at an Australian auction. In September 2007, auction house Deutscher-Menzies broke their sales record with Williams' Landscape with Water Ponds (1965) selling for $1,860,000. The most expensive work sold at an Australian auction in 2009 was Williams' 1965 Evening Sky, Upwey, which sold for $1.15 million.

Two of Williams' paintings, Dry Creek Bed, Werribee Gorge I (1977) and Drifting Smoke (1981) were included in Quintessence Editions Ltd.'s 2007 edition of 1001 Paintings You Must See Before You Die. Williams' work is also represented in William Splatt's 100 Masterpieces of Australian Landscape Painting.

== Personal life ==
Williams met Lyn Watson in January 1960 while painting at Sherbrooke. They were married in March 1961 and moved to the inner-city suburb of South Yarra. They had three daughters: Isobel, Louise and Kate. In 1963, the couple moved to Upwey in the Dandenong Ranges outside Melbourne, a location that would have a decisive impact on his work. In 1964 they travelled through Europe on a Helena Rubenstein Scholarship. In 1969, Williams moved to Hawthorn, an inner suburb of Melbourne.

== Death and legacy ==
In November 1981, Williams was diagnosed with inoperable lung cancer. He died less than six months later in Hawthorn on 22 April 1982, aged 55. Fellow artist and friend John Brack gave the eulogy at his funeral. He said

Fred brought us a new vision of Australia’s landscape at least as valid and impressive as any of the two or three major illuminations which went before it. He changed the way we see our country: an achievement which will live long after all of us are gone.

— John Brack

== Williams' estate ==
Williams' estate is managed by his widow, Lyn Williams. Lyn bought a former factory in inner-Melbourne in 1989 and has managed the artist's estate from there since she sorted through his studio at their former home in Hawthorn. All of the artist's known works have been catalogued on a database. The building houses Williams' easel, brushes, the leather-bound diaries he kept from 1963 until his death, clipping books, a range of works and includes a gallery for hanging and photographing the artist's works. Works that are donated to public galleries and museums are prepared there. In 2009, Lyn Williams completed her ongoing gift to the National Gallery of Victoria (NGV) of the prints of Fred Williams.

== Major collections ==
- Art Gallery of New South Wales
- Art Gallery of Western Australia
- Holmes à Court Collection

== See also ==
- Australian art
