= Joseph Brown (art collector) =

Australian art collector, artist, and philanthropist

Joseph Brown AO OBE (born Josef Braun; 1918 – 24 August 2009) was a Polish-born Australian art collector, art dealer, artist, and philanthropist. In 2004, he donated over 150 works to the National Gallery of Victoria in what was then the largest single gift of artworks to an Australian public institution. Brown was also known for his own artwork and for operating the Joseph Brown Gallery in Melbourne from 1967.

== Early life and education ==
Brown was born Josef Braun in Łódź, Poland in 1918, the seventh of eight children in a middle-class Jewish family. His mother died shortly before the family's departure from Poland. In 1933, at the age of fifteen, he emigrated to Australia with his father and five sisters, joining two older brothers who had previously settled in Melbourne. The family, who had worked in the hosiery industry in Łódź, settled in the Melbourne suburb of Carlton.

Brown attended Princes Hill State School in Carlton, where, lacking sufficient English to comprehend his lessons, he spent his time drawing at the back of the classroom. He won a scholarship to study art at Brunswick Technical College in 1934, which he attended at night while working during the day. However, after six months, the economic pressures of the Great Depression forced him to abandon his studies to contribute to the family income. He took a job at a Bourke Street fashion house and later established his own business, J. Brown Mantles, in 1938 at the age of nineteen.

Despite leaving formal education, Brown continued his art studies independently. Within his first week in Australia, he found his way to the State Library of Victoria on Swanston Street, which he attended three nights per week, reading extensively about art and Australia. He purchased art books during his lunch hour from Miss Bird's antiquarian bookshop on Bourke Street, and attended evening art classes two nights per week at the Working Men's College (now RMIT University) under painter and stained glass artist Napier Waller. Brown later described the State Library as his own private "university" during this period.

== Career ==
=== Military service ===
In 1940, Brown enlisted in the Second Australian Imperial Force and was selected for the Intelligence Section of the 13th Light Horse Regiment. When the regiment was redesignated as the 13th Armoured Regiment and later disbanded in early 1944, he was transferred to the 5th Field Survey Unit, where he served until his demobilisation in late 1945.

=== Art practice ===
Brown began painting and sculpting in the 1930s, producing works that reflected an interest in figuration and the Australian landscape tradition. His early works included a 1934 portrait of his father, Jacob Brown. Following his return from military service and his marriage in 1945, Brown resumed his art practice from a small workshop in his North Balwyn home and later, from 1948, in shared premises with sculptor Clement Meadmore in Flinders Lane.

During the 1940s and 1950s, Brown developed friendships with numerous Australian artists, including social realist painters Yosl Bergner, Noel Counihan, Vic O'Connor and George Luke, as well as Albert Tucker, William Dobell, Russell Drysdale, Charles Blackman, John Perceval and Arthur Boyd. He also established relationships with William Dargie (later chairman of the Commonwealth Art Advisory Board), Clifton Pugh, and Daryl Lindsay (director of the National Gallery of Victoria from 1941–56) and his wife Joan.

Brown's paintings and sculptures from the 1950s and 1960s showed the influence of the early twentieth-century British School, particularly the abstract surrealist paintings of John Tunnard and Edward Wadsworth, and the anthropomorphic sculptures of Henry Moore and Barbara Hepworth. He exhibited in several group shows, including the inaugural Herald Art Show at the Treasury Gardens (Summer 1953), where he displayed two bronze sculptural works alongside sculptors Inge King and Karl Duldig, as well as Danila Vassilieff. He also participated in the Young Lions Festival of Jewish Art at the Argus Gallery (5–12 March 1961) and the Victorian Sculptors Society Annual Exhibition at the Victorian Artists' Society galleries in East Melbourne (mid-1966).

=== Art dealing and collection ===
From 1963, Brown operated as an art consultant from a small space at the Flinders Lane showroom of J. Brown Mantles, his fashion business. In 1967, after selling J. Brown Mantles, he opened the Joseph Brown Gallery at 5 Collins Street, Melbourne, with the encouragement of fellow artists Russell Drysdale and William Dobell, who participated in the gallery's inaugural two-man exhibition. That same year, he purchased Caroline House, a large nineteenth-century residence in South Yarra, to accommodate both his family and his growing art collection.

The gallery held solo exhibitions for artists including Sidney Nolan, Russell Drysdale, John Brack, and Rick Amor, and presented large-scale historical surveys accompanied by fully illustrated, documented catalogues that became sought-after collectors' items. His exhibitions featured both historical and contemporary Australian artists such as John Glover, Eugène von Guérard, Tom Roberts, Frederick McCubbin, Arthur Streeton, John Peter Russell, Rupert Bunny, Margaret Preston, Albert Tucker, and John Perceval.

Brown was instrumental in reclaiming the work of forgotten artists, including Danila Vassilieff, for whom he staged two major exhibitions at the Joseph Brown Gallery in 1973 and 1974. The gallery relocated from Collins Street to Caroline House in 1976 and held its last exhibition in 1982, though Brown continued to work as an art consultant.

During his travels to Paris and New York for his fashion business, Brown visited the Louvre, Metropolitan Museum of Art, and Guggenheim Museum, which sparked his serious interest in collecting. He came to recognise that greatly undervalued Australian colonial art was comparable in quality to American nineteenth-century art. In the 1950s, recognising that European masterpieces would be financially prohibitive, he began systematically collecting Australian art, aiming to create a survey collection spanning two centuries of European settlement in Australia.

=== Philanthropy ===
From 1966 to March 1999, Brown donated a total of 437 artworks to Australian public institutions, including the National Gallery of Australia, the National Gallery of Victoria, state libraries, and regional galleries. Notable gifts included Eugène von Guérard's Ferntree Gully in the Dandenong Ranges to the National Gallery of Australia—a painting that had been proposed in 1857 as the beginning of a national gallery.

In May 2004, Brown made his most significant donation, giving the major part of his collection to the National Gallery of Victoria. The gift included over 100 major paintings and sculptures, along with 54 works on paper (watercolours, drawings and prints), valued at more than $30 million. At the time, this was described as the most generous single gift of works of art ever made to a public gallery in Australia.

Highlights of the Joseph Brown Collection include Frederick McCubbin's Autumn Memories (1989), John Glover's A Mountain Torrent (c. 1837), Eugène von Guérard's Yalla-Y-Poora (1864), Arthur Streeton's In The Artist's Studio (1891), works by John Peter Russell including Almond Tree In Blossom (1887) and Rough Sea, Belle Ile (1900), Russell Drysdale's Tree Form (1945), John Perceval's Floating Dock and Tugboats (1956), Arthur Boyd's Bride and Groom by a Creek (c.1960), Fred Williams's Cricketer (1955), and John Brack's Nude With Dressing Gown (1967). The collection is permanently displayed at the Ian Potter Centre: NGV Australia.

Brown displayed a notice in his gallery stating it would "not sell Australian paintings of the colonial and impressionist periods to overseas collectors as we regard such works as being part of the country's artistic heritage". He was described as extremely public-spirited, with an educational and patriotic impulse: through Australian art, he believed, people might learn profoundly about Australia.

The Joseph Brown Collection was documented in a major publication, Outlines of Australian Art: The Joseph Brown Collection, written by Daniel Thomas and first published by Macmillan Australia in 1973. The book was reprinted in 1980 with an expanded edition containing 205 illustrations, and a third edition published in 1989 featured 407 illustrations. The 1989 edition was also published in the United States by Harry N. Abrams. The publication remains one of the most authoritative accounts of Australian art from the colonial period to the present.

== Awards and honours ==
Brown was awarded the Order of the British Empire (OBE) in 1973 and appointed an Officer of the Order of Australia (AO) in 1990. He received honorary doctorates from Monash University (1981), the University of Melbourne (1986), and La Trobe University (1990) in recognition of his substantial contributions to Australian art history.

== Exhibitions and legacy ==
In 1999, the Ian Potter Museum of Art at the University of Melbourne held a retrospective exhibition titled Dr Joseph Brown AO OBE: a creative life; sixty five years a private artist, showcasing his work from 1934 to 1999. Major exhibitions of the Joseph Brown Collection were held at the National Gallery of Victoria (October–December 1980) and the Art Gallery of New South Wales (May–June 1989). Examples of Brown's own artwork are held in regional art collections including Ballarat Fine Art Gallery, Mornington Peninsula Regional Gallery, Geelong Art Gallery, Cairns Regional Art Gallery, Carrick Hill Gallery, and Newcastle Region Art Gallery.

Brown died on 24 August 2009 at the age of 91. The National Gallery of Victoria paid tribute to him as one of its greatest philanthropists, with Director Gerard Vaughan describing his contribution to the cultural life of Australia as immeasurable. At the time of his 2004 gift, Brown had stated: "I am often very surprised when some people say they have not been to the National Gallery of Victoria. I always stress to them, this is their property. It's their Gallery, they should feel it is theirs. It's not mine, it's not Gerard Vaughan's, it belongs to the people. I would like all Victorians to feel [they own] this immense Collection."

== See also ==
- Joseph Brown Collection
