= Joseph Brown Collection =

The Joseph Brown Collection comprises works of art donated to the National Gallery of Victoria in 2004 by the collector and art dealer Joseph Brown. The collection is displayed in the Ian Potter Centre, part of the NGV. More than 150 works are on display at the centre.

The collection comprises varied Australian art from different periods, including portraits painted by many well-known artists. The display gives a history of Australian art. It includes engravings from the first days of the colony and early European looking landscapes of Australia, and Heidelberg era paintings from the late 19th century, and post-impressionist works of the early 20th century. The Melbourne 'Angry Penguins' school of the 1940s is represented, as are colour field and abstract painting. Many modern and post-modern Australian painters of the later 20th century are also on display. A few works by Australian Aboriginal artists are also included.

== Artists included ==
The collection includes the following artists:

- Wes Walters
- Eugene von Guerard - Yalla-Y-Poora
- Tom Roberts
- Frederick McCubbin - Autumn Memories
- E. M. Boyd
- E. Phillips Fox
- Roger Kemp
- John Olsen
- Margaret Preston
- John Perceval - Floating Dock and Tugboats
- John Brack - Nude With Dressing Gown
- Peter Booth
- Grace Cossington Smith
- Peter Purves Smith
- Arthur Boyd - Bride and Groom by the Creek
- John Russell - Almond Tree and Blossom and Rough Seas
- Brett Whiteley
- Fred Williams - Cricketer
