= Pseudotetracha pulchra =

Scientific classification
- Kingdom: Animalia
- Phylum: Arthropoda
- Clade: Pancrustacea
- Class: Insecta
- Order: Coleoptera
- Suborder: Adephaga
- Family: Cicindelidae
- Genus: Pseudotetracha
- Species: P. pulchra

Binomial name
- Pseudotetracha pulchra (Brown, 1869)

Synonyms
- Megacephala pulchra Brown, 1869

Species of beetle

Pseudotetracha pulchra is a species of tiger beetle in the subfamily Cicindelinae. It was described by Brown in 1869, and is endemic to Australia.
