= Nude with Dressing Gown =

Painting by John Brack

Nude With Dressing Gown
- Artist: John Brack
- Year: 1967
- Medium: oil on canvas
- Dimensions: 115.7 cm × 81.5 cm (45.6 in × 32.1 in)
- Location: National Gallery of Victoria, Melbourne

Nude With Dressing Gown is a 1967 painting by Australian artist John Brack. The painting depicts a nude woman putting on a dressing gown. Unusually for a Brack nude, the painting is a not a formal sitting; instead the subject is "caught ... in a more private moment as she modestly dons a gown".

If his subject was not glowing with an almost fluorescent, irradiated green, this would be one of Brack's most sensual pictures. His model is lithe, adorned with a fashionable 1960s-style bob. She is far from Rubenesque, but the twist of hip is distinctly feminine. ... But any sensuality is counterbalanced by Brack's garish colouration.

— Ashley Crawford,

The work is part of the Joseph Brown Collection at the National Gallery of Victoria.
