= Pseudotetracha kimberleyensis =

Scientific classification
- Kingdom: Animalia
- Phylum: Arthropoda
- Clade: Pancrustacea
- Class: Insecta
- Order: Coleoptera
- Suborder: Adephaga
- Family: Cicindelidae
- Genus: Pseudotetracha
- Species: P. kimberleyensis

Binomial name
- Pseudotetracha kimberleyensis (Mjoberg, 1916)

Synonyms
- Megacephala kimberleyensis Mjoberg, 1916

Species of beetle

Pseudotetracha kimberleyensis is a species of tiger beetle in the subfamily Cicindelinae that was described by Mjoberg in 1916, and is endemic to Australia.
