= Pseudotetracha mendacia =

Scientific classification
- Kingdom: Animalia
- Phylum: Arthropoda
- Clade: Pancrustacea
- Class: Insecta
- Order: Coleoptera
- Suborder: Adephaga
- Family: Cicindelidae
- Genus: Pseudotetracha
- Species: P. mendacia

Binomial name
- Pseudotetracha mendacia (Sumlin, 1997)

Synonyms
- Megacephala mendacia Sumlin, 1997

Species of beetle

Pseudotetracha mendacia is a species of tiger beetle in the subfamily Cicindelinae that was described by Sumlin in 1997, and is endemic to Australia.
