= Pseudotetracha murchisona =

Scientific classification
- Kingdom: Animalia
- Phylum: Arthropoda
- Clade: Pancrustacea
- Class: Insecta
- Order: Coleoptera
- Suborder: Adephaga
- Family: Cicindelidae
- Genus: Pseudotetracha
- Species: P. murchisona

Binomial name
- Pseudotetracha murchisona (Fleutiaux, 1896)

Synonyms
- Tetracha murchisona Fleutiaux, 1896; Megacephala murchisona (Fleutiaux, 1896)

Species of beetle

Pseudotetracha murchisona is a species of tiger beetle that was described by Edmond Jean-Baptiste Fleutiaux in 1896, and is native to Australia.
