= Megacephala baxteri =

Scientific classification
- Domain: Eukaryota
- Kingdom: Animalia
- Phylum: Arthropoda
- Class: Insecta
- Order: Coleoptera
- Suborder: Adephaga
- Family: Cicindelidae
- Genus: Megacephala
- Species: M. baxteri

Binomial name
- Megacephala baxteri Bates, 1886

Species of beetle

Megacephala baxteri is a species of tiger beetle in the subfamily Cicindelinae that was described by Henry Walter Bates in 1886.
