= Megacephala ertli =

Scientific classification
- Domain: Eukaryota
- Kingdom: Animalia
- Phylum: Arthropoda
- Class: Insecta
- Order: Coleoptera
- Suborder: Adephaga
- Family: Cicindelidae
- Genus: Megacephala
- Species: M. ertli

Binomial name
- Megacephala ertli W. Horn, 1904

Species of beetle

Megacephala ertli is a species of tiger beetle in the subfamily Cicindelinae that was described by W. Horn in 1904.
