= Megacephala denticollis =

Scientific classification
- Domain: Eukaryota
- Kingdom: Animalia
- Phylum: Arthropoda
- Class: Insecta
- Order: Coleoptera
- Suborder: Adephaga
- Family: Cicindelidae
- Genus: Megacephala
- Species: M. denticollis

Binomial name
- Megacephala denticollis (Chaudoir, 1843)

Synonyms
- Aptema denticollis Chaudoir, 1843; Megacephala cordofana Thomson, 1857; Megacephala kordofana Kollar, 1868 (Missp.); Megacephala schultzeorum W. Horn, 1904; Megacephala semilevis W. Horn, 1912; Megacephala denticollis persculpta Basilewsky, 1966; Megacephala denticollis tchadica Basilewsky, 1966

Species of beetle

Megacephala denticollis is a species of tiger beetle in the subfamily Cicindelinae that was described by Chaudoir in 1843.
