= Pseudotetracha timberensis =

Scientific classification
- Kingdom: Animalia
- Phylum: Arthropoda
- Clade: Pancrustacea
- Class: Insecta
- Order: Coleoptera
- Suborder: Adephaga
- Family: Cicindelidae
- Genus: Pseudotetracha
- Species: P. timberensis

Binomial name
- Pseudotetracha timberensis Häckel & Anichtchenko, 2015

Species of beetle

Pseudotetracha timberensis is a species of tiger beetle in the subfamily Cicindelinae that was described by Häckel & Anichtchenko in 2015, and is endemic to Australia.
