= Pseudotetracha helmsi =

Scientific classification
- Kingdom: Animalia
- Phylum: Arthropoda
- Clade: Pancrustacea
- Class: Insecta
- Order: Coleoptera
- Suborder: Adephaga
- Family: Cicindelidae
- Genus: Pseudotetracha
- Species: P. helmsi

Binomial name
- Pseudotetracha helmsi (Blackburn, 1892)

Synonyms
- Tetracha helmsi Blackburn, 1892 Megacephala helmsi (Blackburn, 1892)

Species of beetle

Pseudotetracha helmsi is a species of tiger beetle in the subfamily Cicindelinae that was described by Blackburn in 1892, and is endemic to Australia.
