= Megacephala morsii =

Scientific classification
- Domain: Eukaryota
- Kingdom: Animalia
- Phylum: Arthropoda
- Class: Insecta
- Order: Coleoptera
- Suborder: Adephaga
- Family: Cicindelidae
- Genus: Megacephala
- Species: M. morsii

Binomial name
- Megacephala morsii (Fairmaire, 1882)

Synonyms
- Styphloderma morsii Fairmaire, 1882; Styphloderma schaumi W. Horn, 1892; Styphloderma oblongula Fairmaire, 1894; Styphloderma gratiosa W. Horn, 1904; Megacephala occidentalis W. Horn, 1921 (Preocc.); Megacephala levisquamosa W. Horn, 1932; Megacephala morsii bequaerti Basilewsky, 1966; Megacephala morsii basilewskyi Werner, 1999

Species of beetle

Megacephala morsii is a species of tiger beetle in the subfamily Cicindelinae that was described by Fairmaire in 1882.
