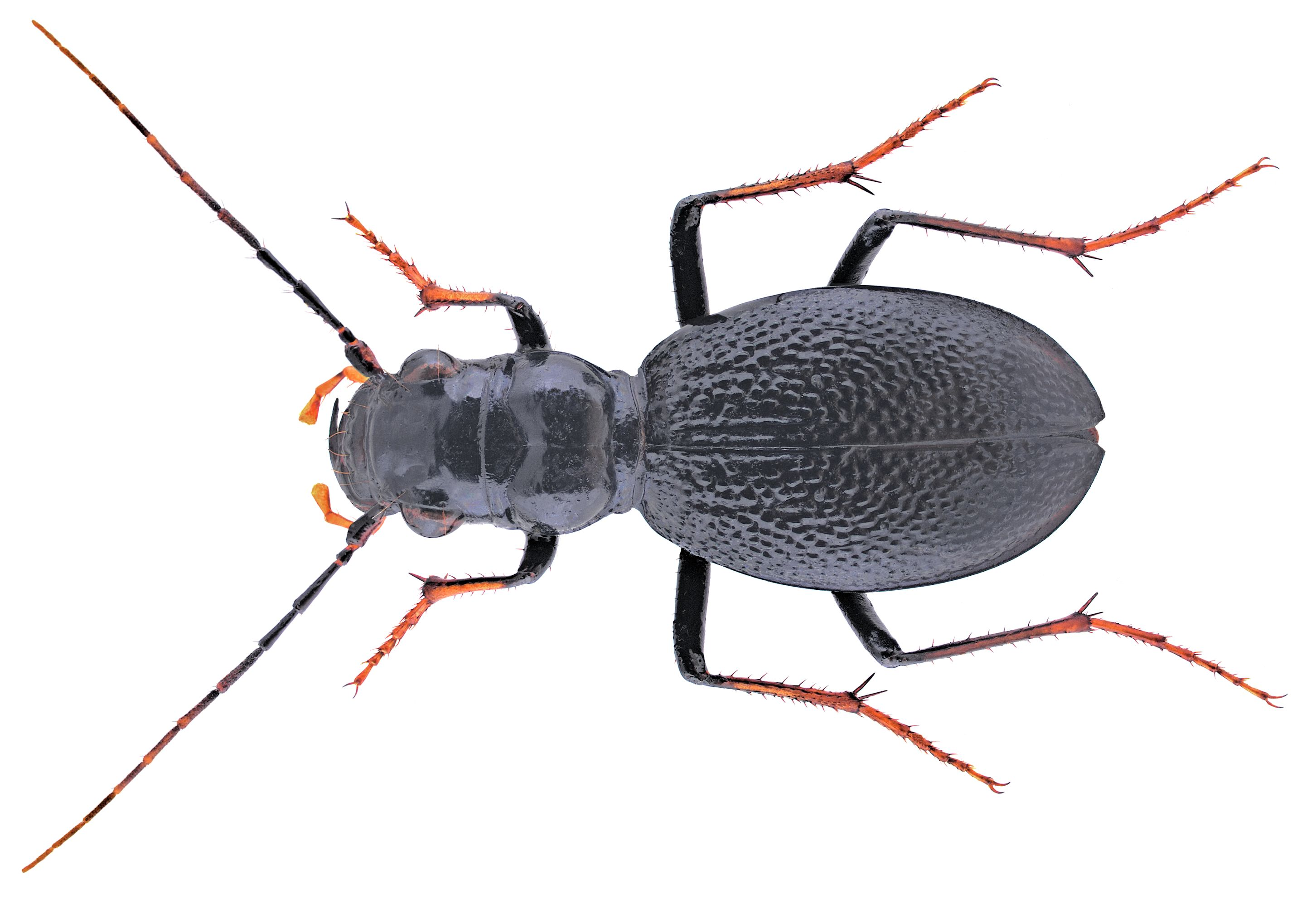
- Megacephala laevicollis
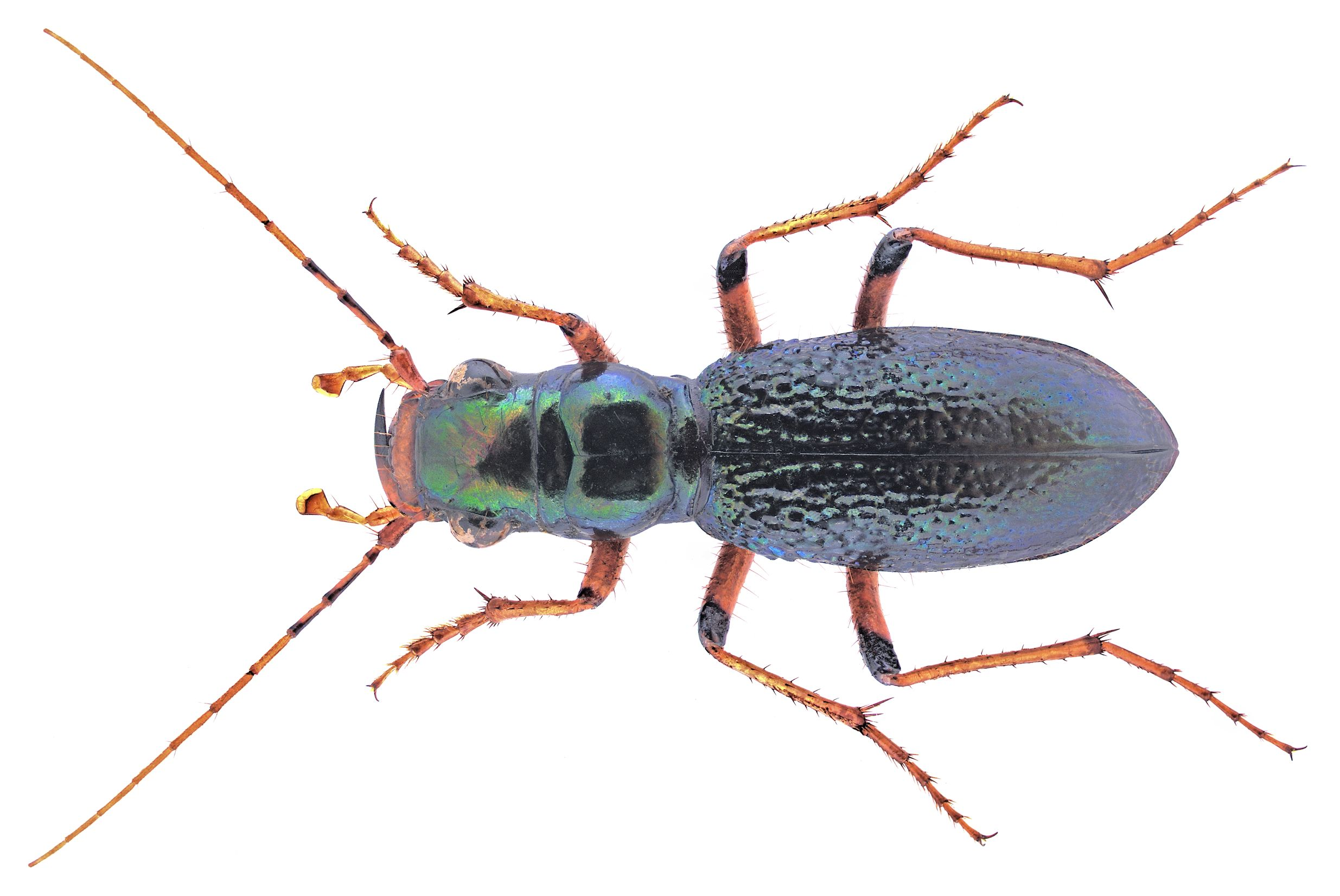
- Megacephala regalis

Scientific classification
- Kingdom: Animalia
- Phylum: Arthropoda
- Class: Insecta
- Order: Coleoptera
- Suborder: Adephaga
- Family: Cicindelidae
- Genus: Megacephala; Latreille, 1802

Synonyms
- Aptema Lepeletier & Serville, 1825; Styphloderma Waterhouse, 1877; Stygphloderma Fleutiaux, 1892 (Missp.)

= Megacephala =

Genus of beetles

Megacephala is a small genus of beetles in the family Cicindelidae restricted to Africa; it was formerly a much larger genus, but its constituent species (including all of the New World species) have been subsequently placed in other genera, primarily Tetracha, but also Grammognatha, Metriocheila, Phaeoxantha, and Pseudotetracha.

- Megacephala apicespinosa Schüle & Kudrna, 2016
- Megacephala asperata (C.O.Waterhouse, 1877)
- Megacephala baxteri Bates, 1886
- Megacephala bocandei Guerin-Meneville, 1848
- Megacephala catenulata Basilewsky, 1950
- Megacephala denticollis (Chaudoir, 1843)
- Megacephala ertli W.Horn, 1904
- Megacephala hanzelkazikmundi Kudrna, 2015
- Megacephala johnnydeppi Werner, 2007
- Megacephala laevicollis (C.O.Waterhouse, 1880)
- Megacephala megacephala (Olivier, 1790)
- Megacephala morsii (Fairmaire, 1882)
- Megacephala quadrisignata Dejean, 1829
- Megacephala regalis Boheman, 1848
- Megacephala somalica Basilewsky, 1966
