= Pseudotetracha oleadorsa =

Scientific classification
- Kingdom: Animalia
- Phylum: Arthropoda
- Clade: Pancrustacea
- Class: Insecta
- Order: Coleoptera
- Suborder: Adephaga
- Family: Cicindelidae
- Genus: Pseudotetracha
- Species: P. oleadorsa

Binomial name
- Pseudotetracha oleadorsa (Sumlin, 1992)

Synonyms
- Megacephala oleadorsa Sumlin, 1992

Species of beetle

Pseudotetracha oleadorsa is a species of tiger beetle in the subfamily Cicindelinae that was described by Sumlin in 1992, and is endemic to Australia.
