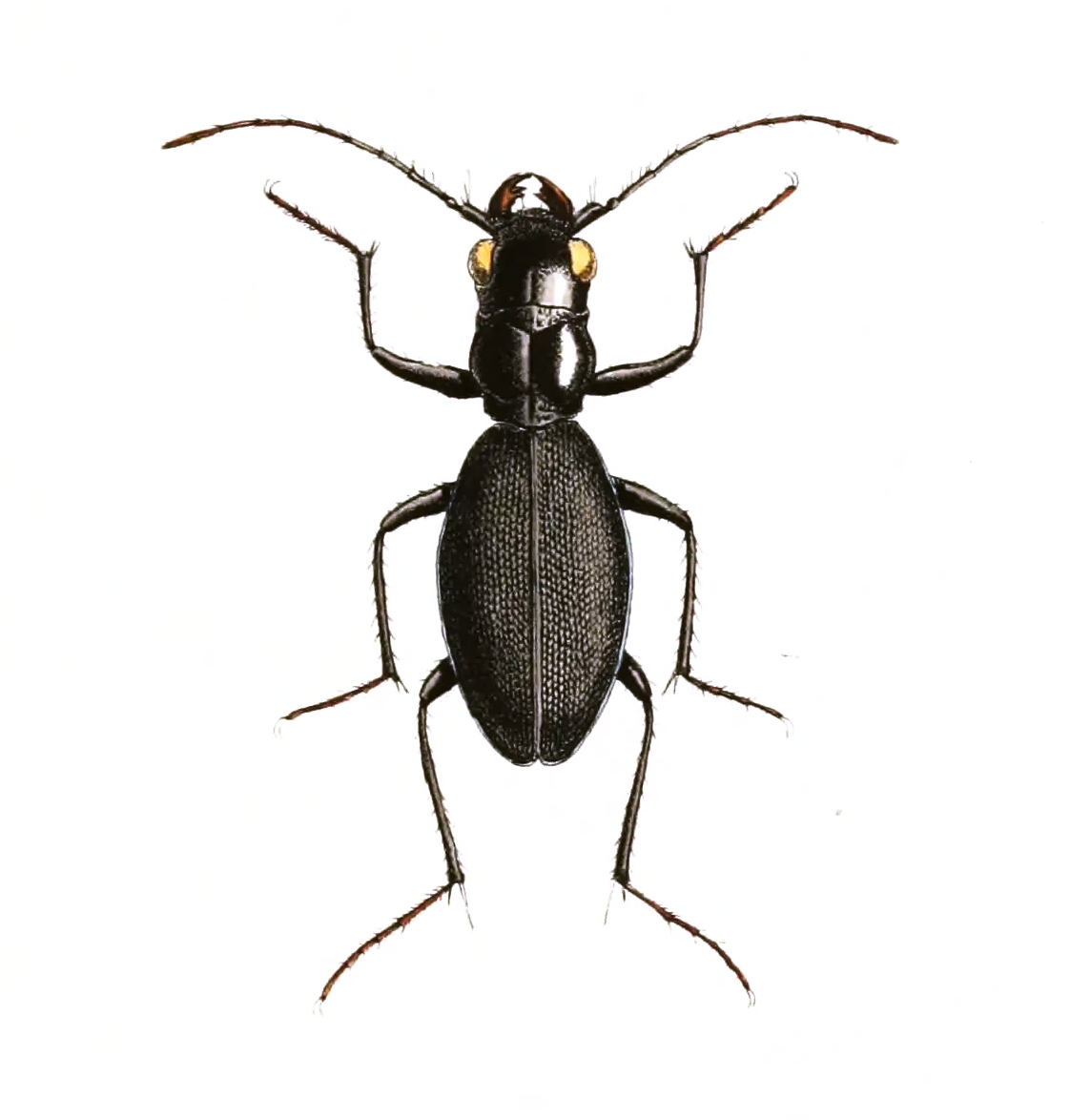

Scientific classification
- Kingdom: Animalia
- Phylum: Arthropoda
- Clade: Pancrustacea
- Class: Insecta
- Order: Coleoptera
- Suborder: Adephaga
- Family: Cicindelidae
- Genus: Megacephala
- Species: M. asperata

Binomial name
- Megacephala asperata (C. O. Waterhouse, 1877)

Synonyms
- Styphloderma asperatum Waterhouse, 1877; Styphloderma subopaca Fairmaire, 1894; Tetracha dodsi Péringuey, 1904; Megacephala breviformis W. Horn, 1913; Megacephala asperata overlaeti Burgeon, 1937; Megacephala asperata kaswabilengae Basilewsky, 1953; Megacephala asperata seydeli Basilewsky, 1953; Megacephala asperata upembana Basilewsky, 1953; Megacephala asperata kigonserana Basilewsky, 1966; Megacephala asperata zuluana Basilewsky, 1966

= Megacephala asperata =

Species of beetle

Megacephala asperata is a species of tiger beetle from Africa in the subfamily Cicindelinae that was described by C. O. Waterhouse in 1877.
