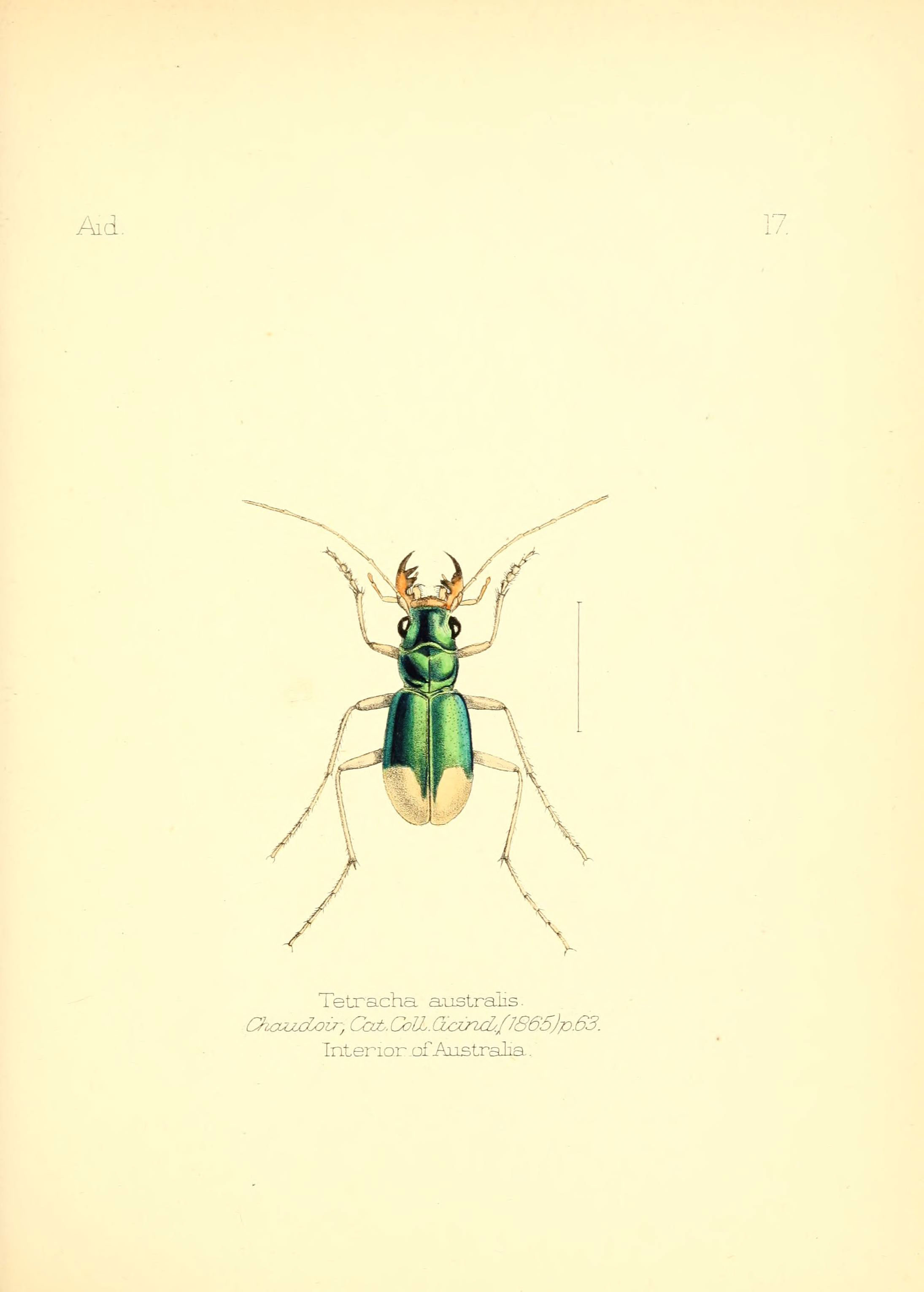

Scientific classification
- Kingdom: Animalia
- Phylum: Arthropoda
- Clade: Pancrustacea
- Class: Insecta
- Order: Coleoptera
- Suborder: Adephaga
- Family: Cicindelidae
- Genus: Pseudotetracha
- Species: P. australis

Binomial name
- Pseudotetracha australis (Chaudoir, 1865)

Synonyms
- Tetracha australis Chaudoir, 1865 Megacephala australis (Chaudoir, 1865)

= Pseudotetracha australis =

Species of beetle

Pseudotetracha australis is a species of tiger beetle in the subfamily Cicindelinae that was described by Chaudoir in 1865, and is endemic to Australia.
