= View of Geelong =

1856 painting by Eugene von Guerard

Coordinates: 38°08′50.42″S 144°21′26.60″E

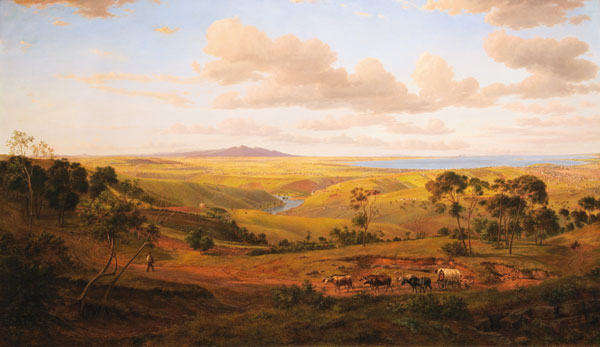
View of Geelong, painted by Johann Joseph Eugen von Guerard in 1856.

Throughout this article, the $ symbol refers to the Australian dollar.

View of Geelong is an 1856 oil painting on canvas by Eugene von Guerard. The painting measures 154.5 x 89 cm and is owned by the Geelong Art Gallery in Victoria, Australia.

It was purchased from English composer Andrew Lloyd Webber for $3.8M. The purchase is the second highest ever for an Australian work of art, with the top being $5.3M paid by the National Gallery of Australia for a portrait of Captain James Cook by John Webber.

Lloyd Webber had bought the painting in 1996 for A$1.98 million.

In 1996, the painting was loaned to the Geelong Art Gallery, where it proved popular.

In 2005, Lloyd Webber offered the painting for sale via auction house Christie's of London, giving the Geelong Gallery first right of refusal. On 7 July 2006 the Geelong Gallery purchased the painting for permanent display in the Geelong Gallery, after being offered $1.5 million from the Victorian state government and the remainder being sought via a community fundraising appeal.
