= Pseudotetracha greyana =

Scientific classification
- Kingdom: Animalia
- Phylum: Arthropoda
- Clade: Pancrustacea
- Class: Insecta
- Order: Coleoptera
- Suborder: Adephaga
- Family: Cicindelidae
- Genus: Pseudotetracha
- Species: P. greyana

Binomial name
- Pseudotetracha greyana (Sloane, 1901)

Synonyms
- Tetracha greyana Sloane, 1901 Megacephala greyana (Sloane, 1901)

Species of beetle

Pseudotetracha greyana is a species of tiger beetle in the subfamily Cicindelinae that was described by Sloane in 1901, and is native to Australia.
