= Pseudotetracha canninga =

Scientific classification
- Kingdom: Animalia
- Phylum: Arthropoda
- Clade: Pancrustacea
- Class: Insecta
- Order: Coleoptera
- Suborder: Adephaga
- Family: Cicindelidae
- Genus: Pseudotetracha
- Species: P. canninga

Binomial name
- Pseudotetracha canninga (McCairns, Freitag, Rose & McDonald, 1997)

Synonyms
- Megacephala canninga McCairns, Freitag, Rose & McDonald, 1997

Species of beetle

Pseudotetracha canninga is a species of tiger beetle in the subfamily Cicindelinae that was described by McCairns, Freitag, Rose & McDonald in 1997. It is endemic to Australia.
