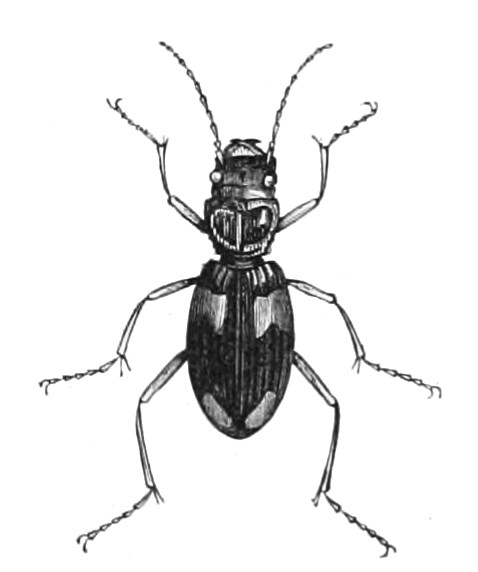

Scientific classification
- Kingdom: Animalia
- Phylum: Arthropoda
- Class: Insecta
- Order: Coleoptera
- Suborder: Adephaga
- Family: Cicindelidae
- Genus: Megacephala
- Species: M. quadrisignata

Binomial name
- Megacephala quadrisignata Dejean, 1829

Synonyms
- Megacephala cabounca Guérin-Méneville, 1848; Megacephala quadrisignata rivaliera Basilewsky, 1966; Megacephala rivalieri Auctt. (Misspelling)

= Megacephala quadrisignata =

Species of beetle

Megacephala quadrisignata is a species of tiger beetle in the subfamily Cicindelinae that was described by Dejean in 1829.
