= Pseudotetracha blackburni =

Scientific classification
- Kingdom: Animalia
- Phylum: Arthropoda
- Clade: Pancrustacea
- Class: Insecta
- Order: Coleoptera
- Suborder: Adephaga
- Family: Cicindelidae
- Genus: Pseudotetracha
- Species: P. blackburni

Binomial name
- Pseudotetracha blackburni (Fleutiaux, 1895)

Synonyms
- Tetracha blackburni Fleutiaux, 1895 Megacephala blackburni (Fleutiaux, 1895)

Species of beetle

Pseudotetracha blackburni is a species of tiger beetle in the subfamily Cicindelinae that was described by Fleutiaux in 1895, and is endemic to Australia.
