= Megacephala bocandei =

Scientific classification
- Domain: Eukaryota
- Kingdom: Animalia
- Phylum: Arthropoda
- Class: Insecta
- Order: Coleoptera
- Suborder: Adephaga
- Family: Cicindelidae
- Genus: Megacephala
- Species: M. bocandei

Binomial name
- Megacephala bocandei Guérin-Méneville, 1848

Synonyms
- Tetracha boccandei Chaudoir 1861 (Missp.); Megacephala njamnjamensis W. Horn, 1892; Megacephala lemoulti W. Horn, 1912; Megacephala brevilevis W. Horn, 1913; Megacephala clermonti W. Horn, 1913; Megacephala levipunctata W. Horn, 1913; Megacephala postampliata W. Horn, 1922

Species of beetle

Megacephala bocandei is a species of tiger beetle in the subfamily Cicindelinae that was described by Félix Édouard Guérin-Méneville in 1848.
