= Ompax spatuloides =

Hoax fish

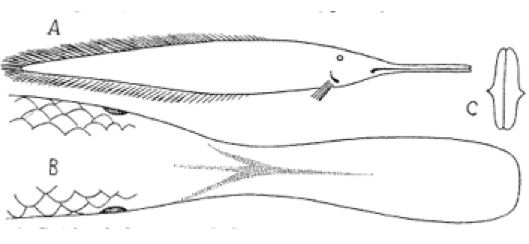
Contemporary drawing of the hoax "fish" Ompax spatuloides by Karl Theodor Staiger, director of the Brisbane Museum, Australia, drawn from the cooked fish, and sent to Francis de Laporte de Castelnau in 1879, who went on to give the "species" a scientific description.

Ompax spatuloides was a hoax fish "discovered" in Australia in August, 1872. Said to be poisonous, it could be found on some lists of Australian fishes through the 1930s.

The fish was a joke perpetrated by people at Gayndah station, Queensland, who prepared it from the body of a mullet, the tail of an eel and the head of a platypus or needlefish. They served it cooked for Karl Theodor Staiger, the director of the Brisbane Museum, and he forwarded a sketch and description of the fake to expert Francis de Laporte de Castelnau, who described the supposed "species" in 1879. The first publication was in the proceedings of the Linnean Society of New South Wales, in which Count Castelnau gave his description with figures reproducing the sketches executed at the time by "a draughtsman" at Staiger's request. Doubts about the existence of the species were expressed as soon as 1881, when William John Macleay included it in a faunal list, but the name continued to appear throughout the twentieth century.

Staiger is quoted as saying the fish was brought to him by indigenous people who had obtained it around ten miles away. The components of the specimen were said by an anonymous confessor writing to the Sydney Morning Herald in 1930 to have been sourced from the tail of an eel, a mullet's body, and the head of an Australian lungfish. The last animal, the Australian lungfish, was an extraordinary fish whose existence had only become known to European researchers just a few years before. The addition of a platypus bill, seemingly shown in profile in Castelnau's accompanying figure, is also reported in the letter revealing the hoax. In selecting the name of the genus, Castelnau says "In our present knowledge of this singular fish, some inconvenience might arise from giving it a significant name; and I think it is preferable to design it under the mysterious historical one of Ompax."
