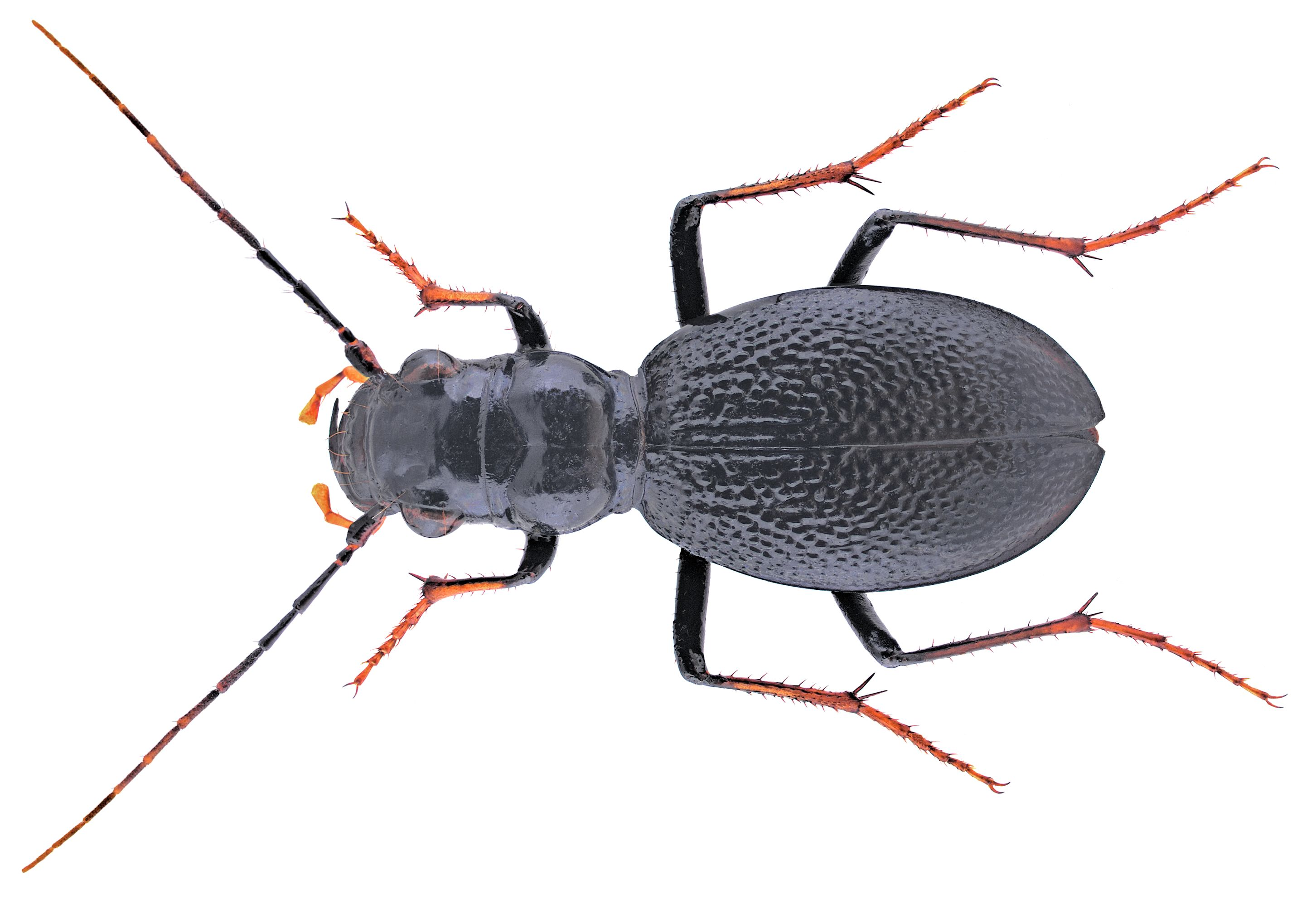

Scientific classification
- Kingdom: Animalia
- Phylum: Arthropoda
- Class: Insecta
- Order: Coleoptera
- Suborder: Adephaga
- Family: Cicindelidae
- Genus: Megacephala
- Species: M. laevicollis

Binomial name
- Megacephala laevicollis (C.O. Waterhouse, 1880)

Synonyms
- Styphloderma laevicolle Waterhouse, 1880; Megacephala rugipennis W. Horn, 1935; Megacephala laevicollis mandli Basilewsky, 1966; Megacephala laevicollis nideki Basilewsky, 1966; Megacephala laevicollis ruziziana Basilewsky, 1966

= Megacephala laevicollis =

Species of beetle

Megacephala laevicollis is a species of tiger beetle in the subfamily Cicindelinae that was described by C.O. Waterhouse in 1880.
