= Pseudotetracha crucigera =

Scientific classification
- Kingdom: Animalia
- Phylum: Arthropoda
- Clade: Pancrustacea
- Class: Insecta
- Order: Coleoptera
- Suborder: Adephaga
- Family: Cicindelidae
- Genus: Pseudotetracha
- Species: P. crucigera

Binomial name
- Pseudotetracha crucigera (W. J. Macleay, 1863)

Synonyms
- Megacephala crucigera Macleay, 1863

Species of beetle

Pseudotetracha crucigera is a species of tiger beetle in the subfamily Cicindelinae that was described by William John Macleay in 1863. It is endemic to Australia.
