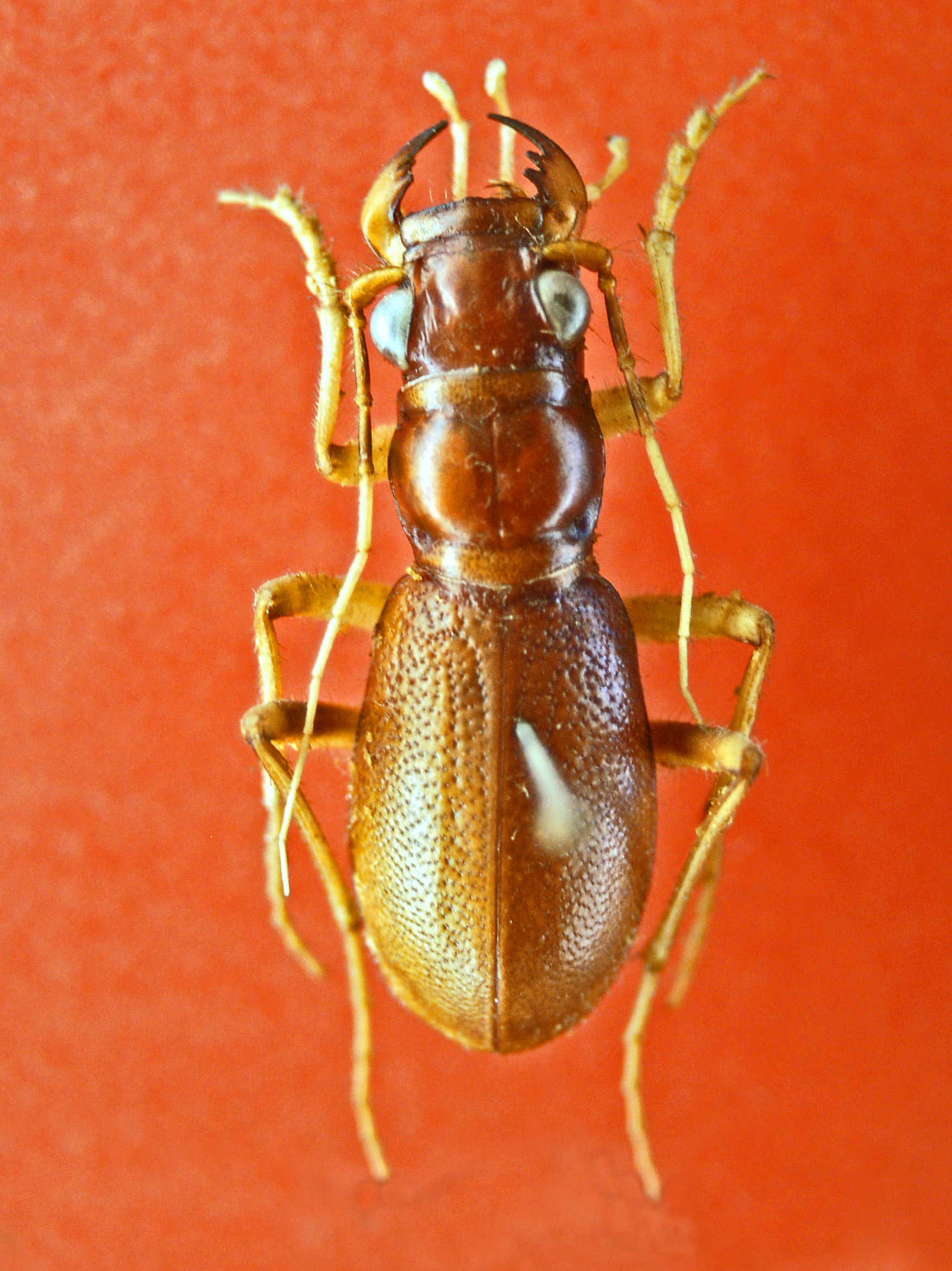
- Megacephala megacephala; museum specimen

Scientific classification
- Kingdom: Animalia
- Phylum: Arthropoda
- Clade: Pancrustacea
- Class: Insecta
- Order: Coleoptera
- Suborder: Adephaga
- Family: Cicindelidae
- Genus: Megacephala
- Species: M. megacephala

Binomial name
- Megacephala megacephala (Olivier, 1790)

Synonyms
- Cicindela megacephala Olivier, 1790; Cicindela megalocephala Fabricius, 1801 (Emend.); Megacephala senegalensis Latreille, 1805; Megacephala cyanescens Dokhtouroff, 1882; Megacephala krüperi Horn, 1892; Megacephala kreuperi Auctt. (Emend.)

= Megacephala megacephala =

Species of beetle

Megacephala megacephala, common name big-headed tiger beetle, is a species of tiger beetle in the subfamily Cicindelinae that was described by Guillaume-Antoine Olivier in 1790.

== Distribution ==
This species can be found in savanna-type habitats of Africa.
