= Pseudotetracha corpulenta =

Scientific classification
- Kingdom: Animalia
- Phylum: Arthropoda
- Clade: Pancrustacea
- Class: Insecta
- Order: Coleoptera
- Suborder: Adephaga
- Family: Cicindelidae
- Genus: Pseudotetracha
- Species: P. corpulenta

Binomial name
- Pseudotetracha corpulenta (Horn, 1907)

Synonyms
- Megacephala corpulenta (Horn, 1907)

Species of beetle

Pseudotetracha corpulenta is a species of tiger beetle in the subfamily Cicindelinae that was described by George Henry Horn in 1907. It is endemic to Australia.
