= Pseudotetracha basalis =

Scientific classification
- Kingdom: Animalia
- Phylum: Arthropoda
- Clade: Pancrustacea
- Class: Insecta
- Order: Coleoptera
- Suborder: Adephaga
- Family: Cicindelidae
- Genus: Pseudotetracha
- Species: P. basalis

Binomial name
- Pseudotetracha basalis (W. J. Macleay, 1866)

Synonyms
- Tetracha basalis Macleay, 1866 Megacephala basalis (Macleay, 1866)

Species of beetle

Pseudotetracha basalis is a species of tiger beetle in the subfamily Cicindelinae that was described by William John Macleay in 1866. It is endemic to Australia.
