= Megacephala somalica =

Scientific classification
- Domain: Eukaryota
- Kingdom: Animalia
- Phylum: Arthropoda
- Class: Insecta
- Order: Coleoptera
- Suborder: Adephaga
- Family: Cicindelidae
- Genus: Megacephala
- Species: M. somalica

Binomial name
- Megacephala somalica Basilewsky, 1966

Synonyms
- Megacephala somalica cassolai Basilewsky, 1978

Species of beetle

Megacephala somalica is a species of tiger beetle in the subfamily Cicindelinae that was described by Basilewsky in 1966.
