= Pseudotetracha intermedia =

Scientific classification
- Kingdom: Animalia
- Phylum: Arthropoda
- Clade: Pancrustacea
- Class: Insecta
- Order: Coleoptera
- Suborder: Adephaga
- Family: Cicindelidae
- Genus: Pseudotetracha
- Species: P. intermedia

Binomial name
- Pseudotetracha intermedia (Sloane, 1906)

Synonyms
- Megacephala intermedia Sloane, 1906)

Species of beetle

Pseudotetracha intermedia is a species of tiger beetle in the subfamily Cicindelinae that was described by Sloane in 1906, and is endemic to Australia.
