= Pseudotetracha =

Scientific classification
- Domain: Eukaryota
- Kingdom: Animalia
- Phylum: Arthropoda
- Class: Insecta
- Order: Coleoptera
- Suborder: Adephaga
- Family: Cicindelidae
- Tribe: Megacephalini
- Genus: Pseudotetracha; Fleutiaux, 1894

Synonyms
- Australicapitona Sumlin, 1992

Genus of beetles

Pseudotetracha is a genus of tiger beetles in the family Cicindelidae, formerly included within the genus Megacephala, and endemic to Australia.

== Species ==
- Pseudotetracha australasiae (Hope, 1842)
- Pseudotetracha australis (Chaudoir, 1865)
- Pseudotetracha basalis (Macleay, 1866)
- Pseudotetracha blackburni (Fleutiaux, 1895)
- Pseudotetracha bostockii (Laporte, 1867)
- Pseudotetracha canninga (McCairns, Freitag, Rose & McDonald, 1997)
- Pseudotetracha castelnaui (Sloane, 1906)
- Pseudotetracha corpulenta (Horn, 1907)
- Pseudotetracha crucigera (Macleay, 1863)
- Pseudotetracha cuprascens (Sumlin, 1997)
- Pseudotetracha cylindrica (Macleay, 1863)
- Pseudotetracha greyana (Sloane, 1901)
- Pseudotetracha helmsi (Blackburn, 1892)
- Pseudotetracha hopei (Laporte, 1867)
- Pseudotetracha howittii (Laporte, 1867)
- Pseudotetracha intermedia (Sloane, 1906)
- Pseudotetracha ion (Sumlin, 1997)
- Pseudotetracha karratha (Sumlin, 1992)
- Pseudotetracha kimberleyensis (Mjoberg, 1916)
- Pseudotetracha marginicollis (Sloane, 1906)
- Pseudotetracha mendacia (Sumlin, 1997)
- Pseudotetracha murchisona (Fleutiaux, 1896)
- Pseudotetracha oleadorsa (Sumlin, 1992)
- Pseudotetracha pulchra (Brown, 1869
- Pseudotetracha scapularis (Macleay, 1863)
- Pseudotetracha serrella (Sumlin, 1997)
- Pseudotetracha spenceri (Sloane, 1897)
- Pseudotetracha timberensis Häckel & Anichtchenko, 2015
- Pseudotetracha whelani (Sumlin, 1992)
