= Megacephala johnnydeppi =

Scientific classification
- Domain: Eukaryota
- Kingdom: Animalia
- Phylum: Arthropoda
- Class: Insecta
- Order: Coleoptera
- Suborder: Adephaga
- Family: Cicindelidae
- Genus: Megacephala
- Species: M. johnnydeppi

Binomial name
- Megacephala johnnydeppi Werner, 2007

Species of beetle

Megacephala johnnydeppi is a species of tiger beetle in the subfamily Cicindelinae that was described by Werner in 2007.
