= Pseudotetracha spenceri =

Scientific classification
- Kingdom: Animalia
- Phylum: Arthropoda
- Clade: Pancrustacea
- Class: Insecta
- Order: Coleoptera
- Suborder: Adephaga
- Family: Cicindelidae
- Genus: Pseudotetracha
- Species: P. spenceri

Binomial name
- Pseudotetracha spenceri (Sloane, 1897)

Synonyms
- Megacephala spenceri Sloane, 1897

Species of beetle

Pseudotetracha spenceri is a species of tiger beetle in the subfamily Cicindelinae that was described by Sloane in 1897, and is native to Australia.
