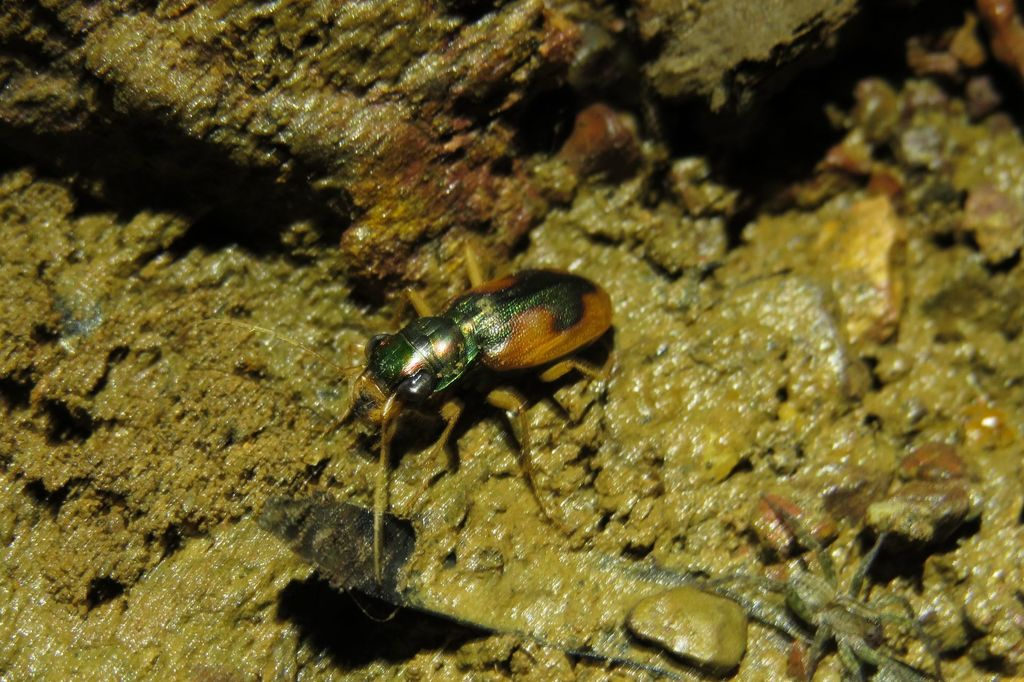

Scientific classification
- Kingdom: Animalia
- Phylum: Arthropoda
- Clade: Pancrustacea
- Class: Insecta
- Order: Coleoptera
- Suborder: Adephaga
- Family: Cicindelidae
- Genus: Pseudotetracha
- Species: P. australasiae

Binomial name
- Pseudotetracha australasiae (Hope, 1842)

Synonyms
- Megacephala australasiae Hope, 1842

= Pseudotetracha australasiae =

Species of beetle

Pseudotetracha australasiae is a species of tiger beetle in the subfamily Cicindelinae. It was described by Hope in 1842. It is endemic to Australia.
