= Waterfall, Strath Creek =

1862 painting by Eugene von Guérard

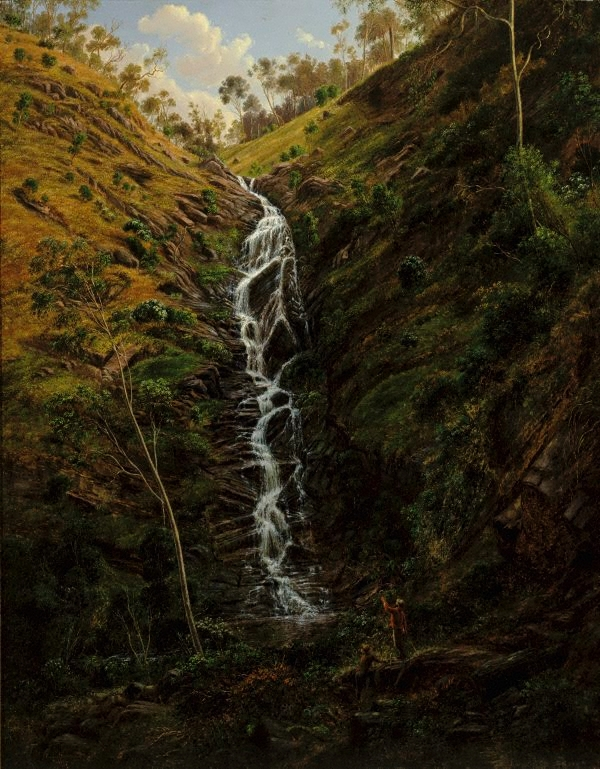
- Artist: Eugene von Guerard
- Year: 1862
- Type: Oil paint on canvas
- Dimensions: 83.2 by 65.7 centimetres (32.8 in × 25.9 in)
- Location: Art Gallery of New South Wales; Sydney

Waterfall, Strath Creek is an 1862 oil painting by Austrian artist Eugene von Guerard. The work is in the collection of the Art Gallery of New South Wales and was purchased in 1967. It depicts Strath Creek Falls, a waterfall located in the Mount Disappointment State Forest in the Australian state of Victoria.

A 1980 painting A waterfall (Strath Creek) by Australian artist William Delafield Cook that won that year's Wynne Prize identified the painting's influence as "I found the spot where he had sat to do his drawing … The waterfall was almost exactly as it was in von Guérard's picture. He was at Strath Creek on 14 January 1862; I was there 23 January 1980."

A 1989 work by artist Imants Tillers titled Untitled (Deaf) used Waterfall, Strath Creek to address "the vexed issue of Australian identity"
