= François-Louis Laporte, comte de Castelnau =

French explorer and naturalist

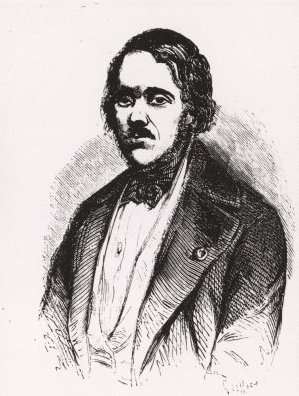
Francis de Laporte de Castelnau

François-Louis Nompar de Caumont Laporte, comte de Castelnau (born François-Louis Nompar de Caumont La Force; 24 December 1802 (Note: This is his true birth date, according to Evenhuis in 2012. Many biographies give his year of birth as either 1810 or 1812, and his birth date is commonly given as 25 December 1810.) – 4 February 1880) was a French naturalist, also known as François Laporte or Francis de Castelnau. The standard author abbreviation Castelnau is used to indicate him when citing a botanical name and zoological names other than insects. Laporte is typically used when citing an insect name, or Laporte de Castelnau.

== Life ==
Born in London, Castelnau studied natural history in Paris. From 1837 to 1841, he traveled in the United States, Texas, and Canada. He visited Middle Florida from November 1837 until March 1838, publishing "Essai sur la Floride du Milieu" in 1843. In Canada, he studied the fauna of the Canadian lakes and the river systems of Upper and Lower Canada (roughly corresponding to the modern provinces of Ontario and Quebec) and of the United States.

Castelnau, a French savant, was sent by Louis Philippe, in 1843, with two botanists and a taxidermist, on an expedition to cross South America from Rio de Janeiro to Lima, following the watershed between the Amazon and La Plata river systems, and thence to Pará. He was gone for five years, with the expedition lasting into 1847. During the expedition, he also collected word lists of various indigenous South American languages, including Bororoan languages and Guachi.

In 1856-57, he visited the Cape of Good Hope, travelling as far east as Algoa Bay, and subsequently wrote a treatise on South African fish (1861).

He served as the French consul in Bahia in 1848; in Siam sometime between 1856 and 1858, and in Melbourne, Australia, from 1864 to 1877.

== Hoax Australian fish ==
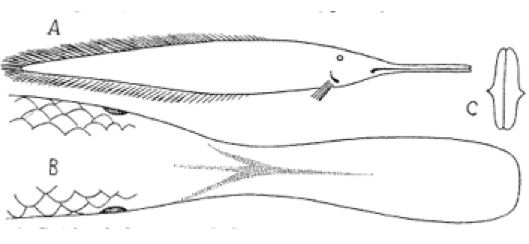
The drawing of the hoax "fish" Ompax spatuloides by Karl Theodor Staiger, sent to Castelnau in 1879, who went on to give the "species" a scientific description

Through no fault of his own, Castelnau's name is attached to an Australian hoax. "Ompax spatuloides", a supposed ganoid fish said to have been discovered in 1872 and named by Castelnau, was a joke originally directed at Karl Staiger, the director of the Brisbane Museum. Staiger forwarded a sketch and description of the made-up fish to Castelnau, who duly described it.

== Legacy ==
Castelnau is commemorated, among others, in the scientific names of:

- a species of Australian gecko, Oedura castelnaui,
- a species of ground beetle, Megacephala castelnaui,
- a species of scarab beetle, Hybosorus laportei,
- a species of freshwater crab, Goyazana castelnaui,
- an aphid Cinara laportei,
- the spotback skate, Atlantoraja castelnaui
- the plant genus Laportea.

== Works ==
- Histoire naturelle, 1837.
- Expédition dans les parties centrales de l'Amérique: histoire naturelle des insectes coléoptères, 1840.
- with Hippolyte Louis Gory Histoire naturelle et iconographie des insectes coléoptères, publiée par monographies séparées, quatre monographies dont la première semble être la seule signée par Laporte (quatre tomes et sept volumes, P. Duménil, Paris, 1837–1841).
- Vues et souvenirs de l'Amérique du Nord, 1842.
- "Essai sur la Floride du Milieu", Nouvelles Annales des Voyages et des Sciences Géographiques, IV, 1843.
- Mémoires sur les poissons de l'Afrique australe, 1843.

== See also ==
- Category:Taxa named by François-Louis Laporte, comte de Castelnau
