= Karl Theodor Staiger =

German chemical analyst, naturalist and museum curator

Karl Theodor Staiger (8 October 1833 — 5 October 1888) was a German chemical analyst, naturalist and museum curator. Karl Theodor Staiger worked as a chemist for the Queensland Government 1873–80 and worked with Nicholas Miklouho-Maclay. He was secretary to the Queensland Museum from 1876 to 1879.

== Family ==
Karl Theodor Staiger was born in Künzelsau, Württemberg, Germany, on 8 October 1833. He married Henrietta Pearce (1854—1941) in Brisbane on 19 December 1874.

== Australia ==
Staiger was one of a number of influential German-speaking residents — such as Ludwig Becker, Hermann Beckler, William Blandowski, Amalie Dietrich, Wilhelm Haacke, Diedrich Henne, Gerard Krefft, Johann Luehmann, Johann Menge, Ludwig Preiss, Carl Ludwig Christian Rümker (a.k.a. Ruemker), Moritz Richard Schomburgk, Richard Wolfgang Semon, George Ulrich, Eugene von Guérard, Robert von Lendenfeld, Ferdinand von Mueller, Georg von Neumayer, and Carl Wilhelmi — who brought their "epistemic traditions" to Australia, and not only became "deeply entangled with the Australian colonial project", but also were "intricately involved in imagining, knowing and shaping colonial Australia" (Barrett, et al., 2018, p. 2).

== Death ==
Staiger, who had been ill for some time, died of consumption at his residence, Staigersleigh, Edmonstone Street, South Brisbane.

== Works ==
Partial list

- 1878: Phylloxera vastatrix, the Grape Vine Destroyer, Translated from the German of Dr. Geo. David by K.T. Staiger, F.L.S., Government Analytical Chemist, Queensland, Brisbane: Queensland Board of Enquiry into Diseases of Plants and Animals.
  - A translation of David, Georg (1875), Die wurzellaus des weinstockes (Phylloxera vastatrix) in allen ihren beziehungen gemeinverständlich dargestellt, Edmund Rodrian: Wiesbaden, Germany.
- 1879: (with Frederick Manson Bailey) An illustrated monograph of the grasses of Queensland, Issued by the Board appointed by the government of Queensland in 1875 to inquire into the causes and the various diseases affecting livestock and plants, Brisbane: Warwick & Sapsford.

== Legacy ==
The tree Eucalyptus staigeriana was named in his honour.

== See also ==
- Ompax spatuloides
- Phylloxera vastatrix
