= Boheman =

Boheman is a Swedish surname.

== Prevalence ==
Outside of Sweden, the surname is also prevalent in the United States.

== Origin ==
The surname originates from the name of a burguess from Jönköping.

== Notable people ==
Notable people with this surname include:

- Carl Adolf Boheman (1764–1831), Swedish mystic
- Carl Henrik Boheman (1796–1868), Swedish entomologist
- Erik Boheman (1895–1979), Swedish diplomat
