= Eugene von Guerard =

Austrian-born artist (1811–1901), active in Australia

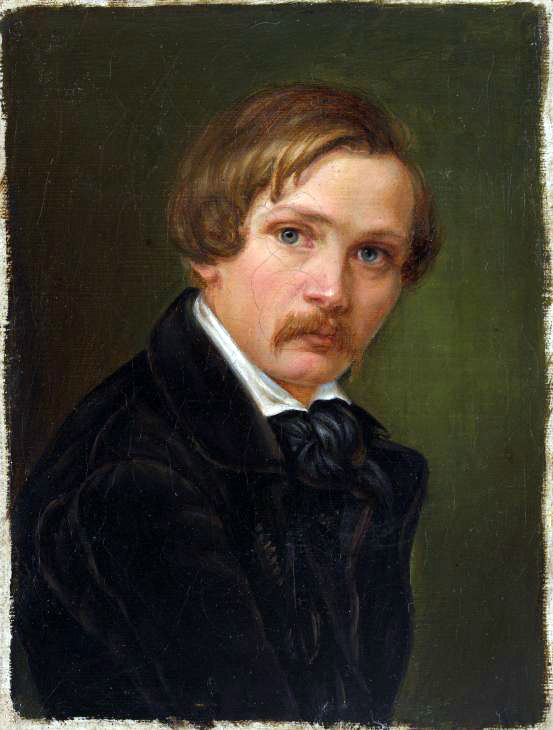
- Born: Johann Joseph Eugen von Guérard; 17 November 1811; Vienna, Austrian Empire
- Died: 17 April 1901 (aged 89); Chelsea, London, England
- Occupation: Painter
- Notable work: View of Geelong, Waterfall, Strath Creek

Johann Joseph Eugene von Guérard (Note: His first name is variously spelled "Eugen", "Eugene", "Eugène", one source mentions "Jean" (instead of "Johann"); his surname is spelled "Guerard" or "Guérard". The most frequent combination is that used by the National Gallery of Australia: "Eugene von Guérard".) (17 November 1811 – 17 April 1901) was an Austrian-born artist, active in Australia from 1852 until 1882. Known for his finely detailed landscapes in the tradition of the Düsseldorf School of painting, he is represented in Australia's major public galleries, and is referred to in the country as Eugene von Guerard.

== Early life ==
Born in Vienna, Austria, von Guerard toured Italy with his father (a painter of miniatures at the court of Emperor Francis I of Austria) from 1826, and between 1830 and 1832 resided in Rome, where he became involved with a number of German artists. The foremost landscape painter amongst these so-called Deutsch Römer [German Romans] was Joseph Anton Koch, but he also met there members of the Lukasbund, a group of young German breakaway artists that became known as the Nazarenes, From 1841 he studied landscape painting in Germany at the Kunstakademie Düsseldorf and travelled widely. Von Guerard's personal artistic style was formed by his first teacher, his miniaturist father with whom he travelled throughout Italy. Other influences ascribed to von Guerard are Claude Lorrain, Nicolas Poussin and Salvator Rosa. During his studies at the Düsseldorf Academy he absorbed the new criterion for German art promoted by his landscape lecturer Johann Wilhelm Schirmer under the directorship of ex-Nazarenes member Wilhelm von Schadow: to present "elevated" subject matter in the style of a new "truthful"' realism. The Düsseldorf style of painting combined concepts of prevailing trends: historicism, a lingering Romanticism and a new visually based Realism that required taking observations from nature. Von Guerard's Australian landscapes show his sensitive perception of the Australian landscape, whilst his stylistic methodology exemplifies the confluence of various styles derived from his European artistic heritage.

== Australia ==
In 1852 von Guerard arrived in Victoria, Australia, determined to try his luck on the Victorian goldfields. As a gold-digger he was unsuccessful, but he did produce a large number of intimate studies of goldfields life, quite different from the deliberately awe-inspiring landscapes for which he was later to become famous.

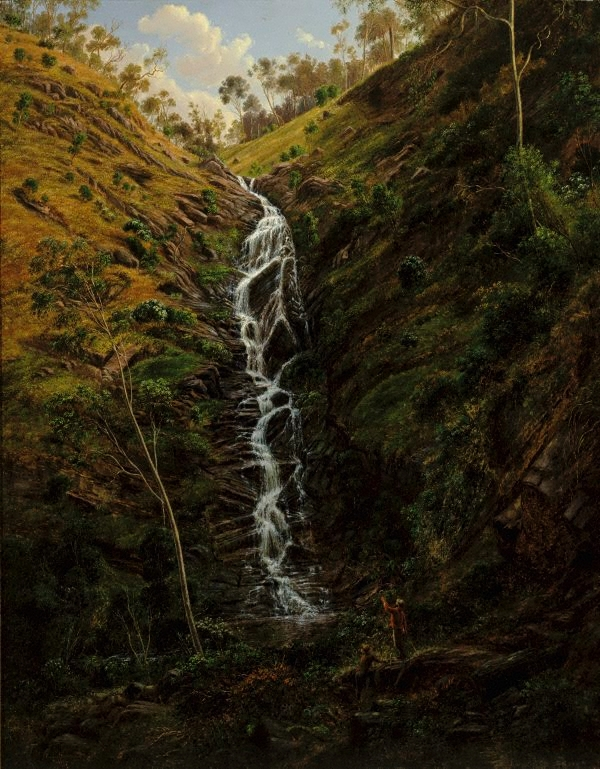
Waterfall, Strath Creek, 1862, Art Gallery of New South Wales.

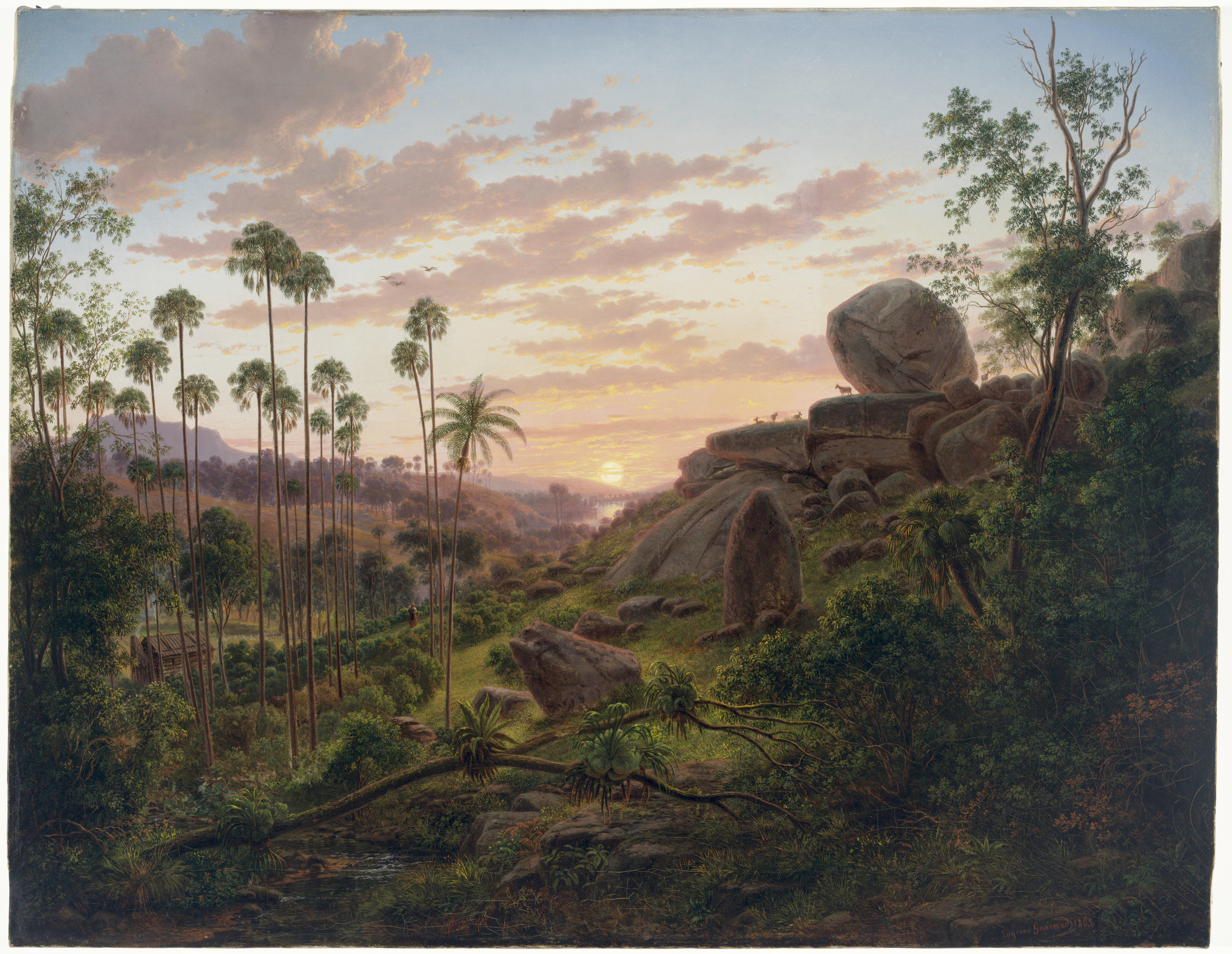
Sunset in New South Wales, 1865, State Library of New South Wales.

He was one of a number of influential German-speaking residents – such as Ludwig Becker, Hermann Beckler, William Blandowski, Amalie Dietrich, Wilhelm Haacke, Diedrich Henne, Gerard Krefft, Johann Luehmann, Johann Menge, Carl Mücke (a.k.a. Muecke), Ludwig Preiss, Carl Ludwig Christian Rümker (a.k.a. Ruemker), Moritz Richard Schomburgk, Richard Wolfgang Semon, Karl Theodor Staiger, George Ulrich, Robert von Lendenfeld, Ferdinand von Mueller, Georg von Neumayer, and Carl Wilhelmi – who brought their "epistemic traditions" to Australia, and not only became "deeply entangled with the Australian colonial project", but also were "intricately involved in imagining, knowing and shaping colonial Australia".

By the early 1860s von Guerard was recognised as the foremost landscape artist in the colonies, touring Southeast Australia and New Zealand in pursuit of the sublime and the picturesque. He is most known for the wilderness paintings produced during this time, which are remarkable for their shadowy lighting and fastidious detail. Indeed, his view of Tower Hill (1855) in south-western Victoria was used as a source of information of local native vegetation when an extensive revegetation project was undertaken in the Tower Hill Wildlife Reserve from 1961. Art critic Christopher Allen wrote, "No one has ever looked at the Australian landscape in a more exacting way than von Guerard, inspired by Alexander von Humboldt's vision of the quasi-scientific vocation of art."

In 1866 his Valley of the Mitta Mitta was presented to the National Gallery of Victoria in Melbourne; in 1870 the trustees purchased his Mount Kosciusko. In 2006, the City of Greater Geelong purchased his 1856 painting View of Geelong for A$3.8M. His painting, Yalla-y-Poora, is in the Joseph Brown Collection on display at the National Gallery of Victoria. In 2018 another painting, Stoneleigh, Beaufort near Ararat, Victoria (1866) was put on permanent display in the Galleries of the State Library of New South Wales.

Von Guerard's paintings were also purchased by the Art Gallery of New South Wales including Waterfall, Strath Creek (1862), Sydney Heads (1865) and Milford Sound, New Zealand (1877–1879) among many others.

The State Library of New South Wales in Sydney holds 32 sketchbooks which cover von Guerard’s twenty-eight years in Australia and also the period of his early travels in the Rhineland and Italy and his return to Europe after 1881. The drawings include pencil sketches, detailed pen and ink or pencil drawings, and a few with colour added and include works done on scientific expeditions with Alfred William Howitt and Georg von Neumayer, the meteorologist. The sketchbooks cover Italy and Germany, 1835–1852, Australia, 1854–1891, and the English sketchbook, 1891–1900.

The only known copy of von Guerard's 1852–1854 diary of his time on the goldfields is held in England. But a typescript translation made from the original German is held in the State Library of New South Wales. It consists of one volume of bound extracts from von Guerard's journal, 18 August 1852 – 16 March 1854, with ten original ink illustrations pasted onto leaves at end of volume. Extracts cover his departure from Gravesend, England, on board the Windermere and the voyage out to Melbourne, his stay at the Eureka and Ballarat goldfields and his departure to Geelong. The translation may have been made by his daughter, Victoria, who was born in Australia and married an Englishman. For a short time, he lived in Daylesford and created several paintings of the area.

In 1870 von Guerard was appointed the first Master of the School of Painting at the National Gallery of Victoria, where he was to influence the training of artists for the next 11 years. His reputation, high at the beginning of this period, had faded somewhat towards the end because of his rigid adherence to picturesque subject matter and detailed treatment in the face of the rise of the more intimate Heidelberg School style. Amongst his pupils were Frederick McCubbin and Tom Roberts. Von Guerard retired from his position at the National Gallery School the end of 1881 and departed for Europe in January 1882. In 1891 his wife died. Two years later, he lost his investments in the Australian bank crash and he lived in poverty until his death in Chelsea, London, on 17 April 1901.

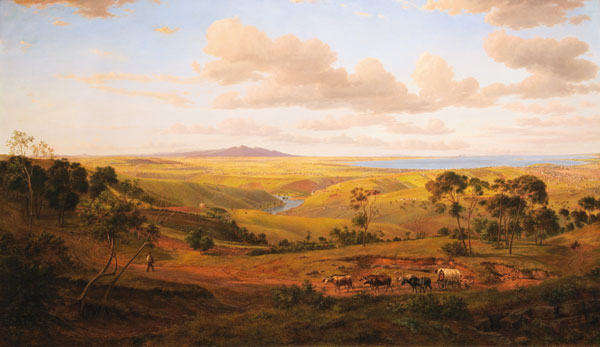
View of Geelong, 1856, Geelong Gallery

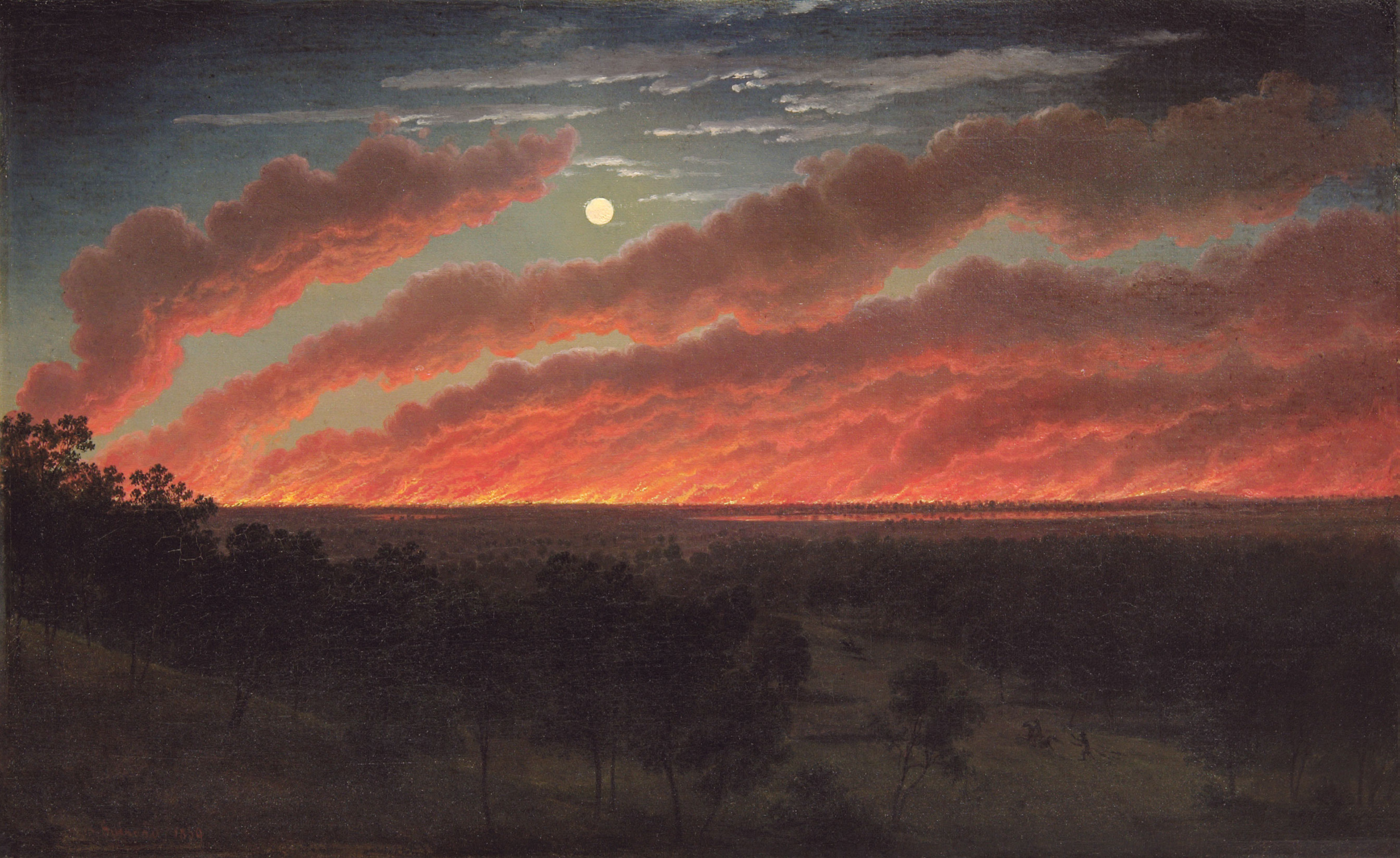
Bush fire between Mount Elephant and Timboon, 1857, Art Gallery of Ballarat

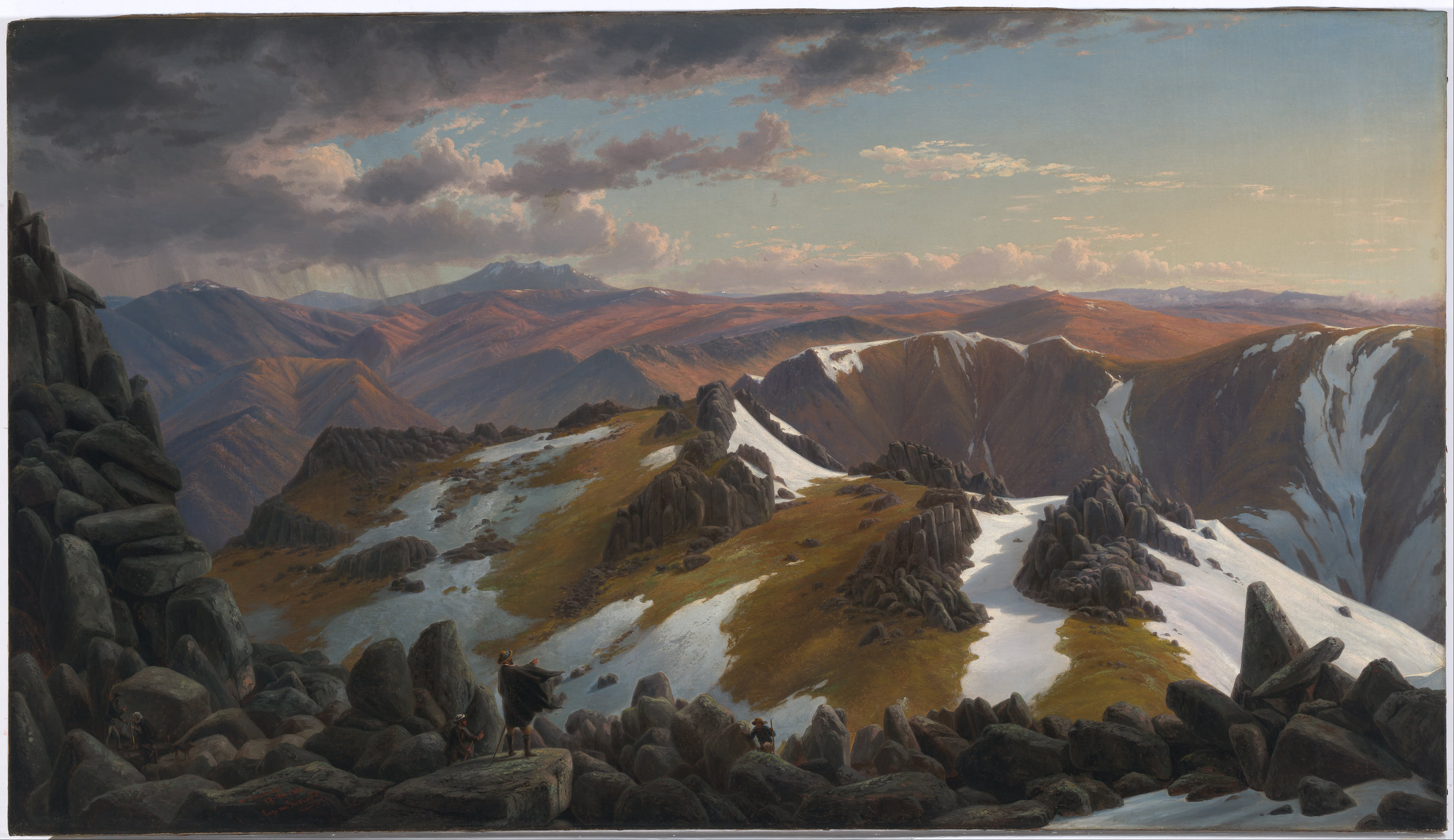
North-east View from the Northern Top of Mount Kosciusko, 1863, National Gallery of Australia

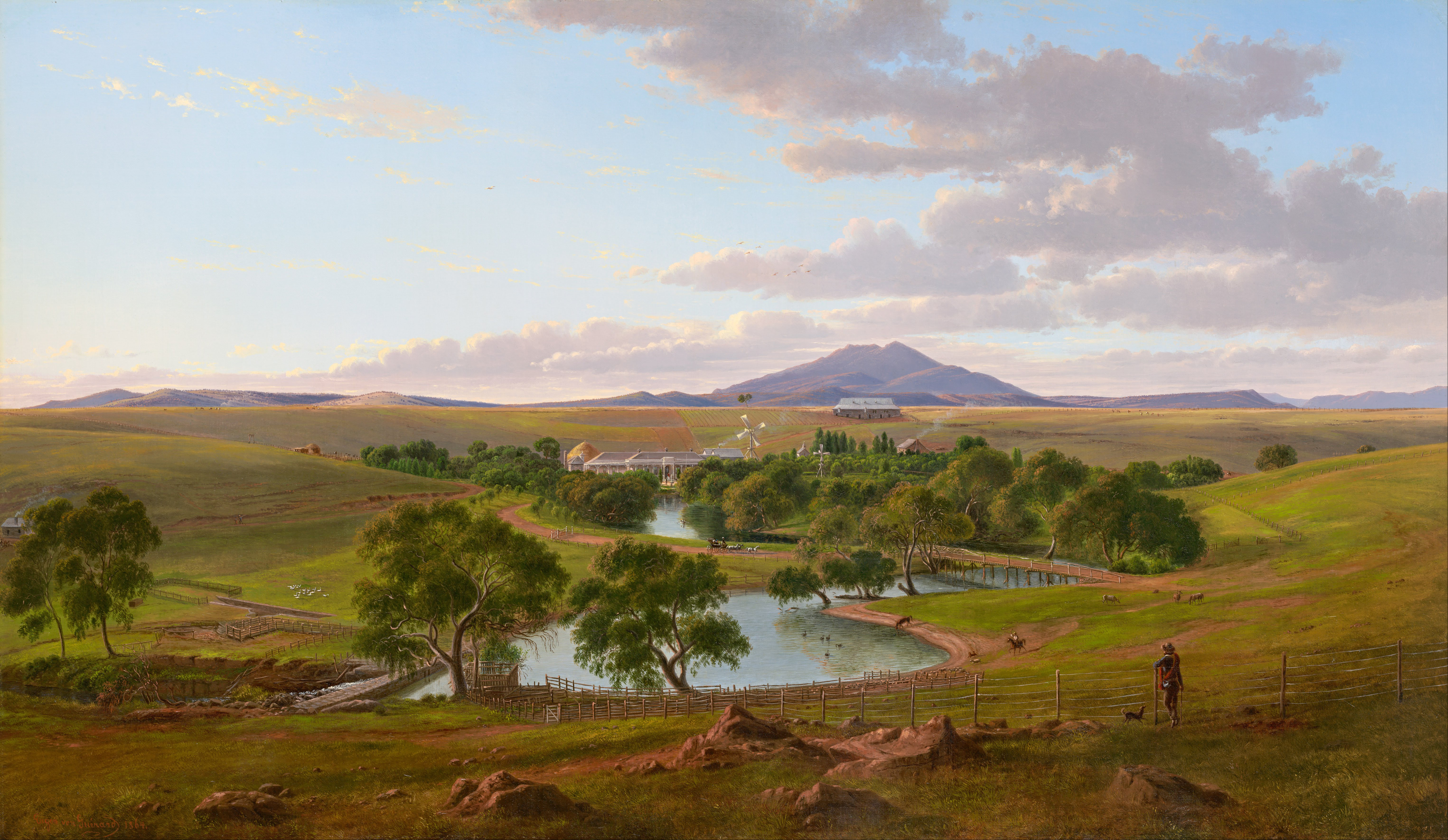
Yalla-y-Poora, 1864, National Gallery of Victoria

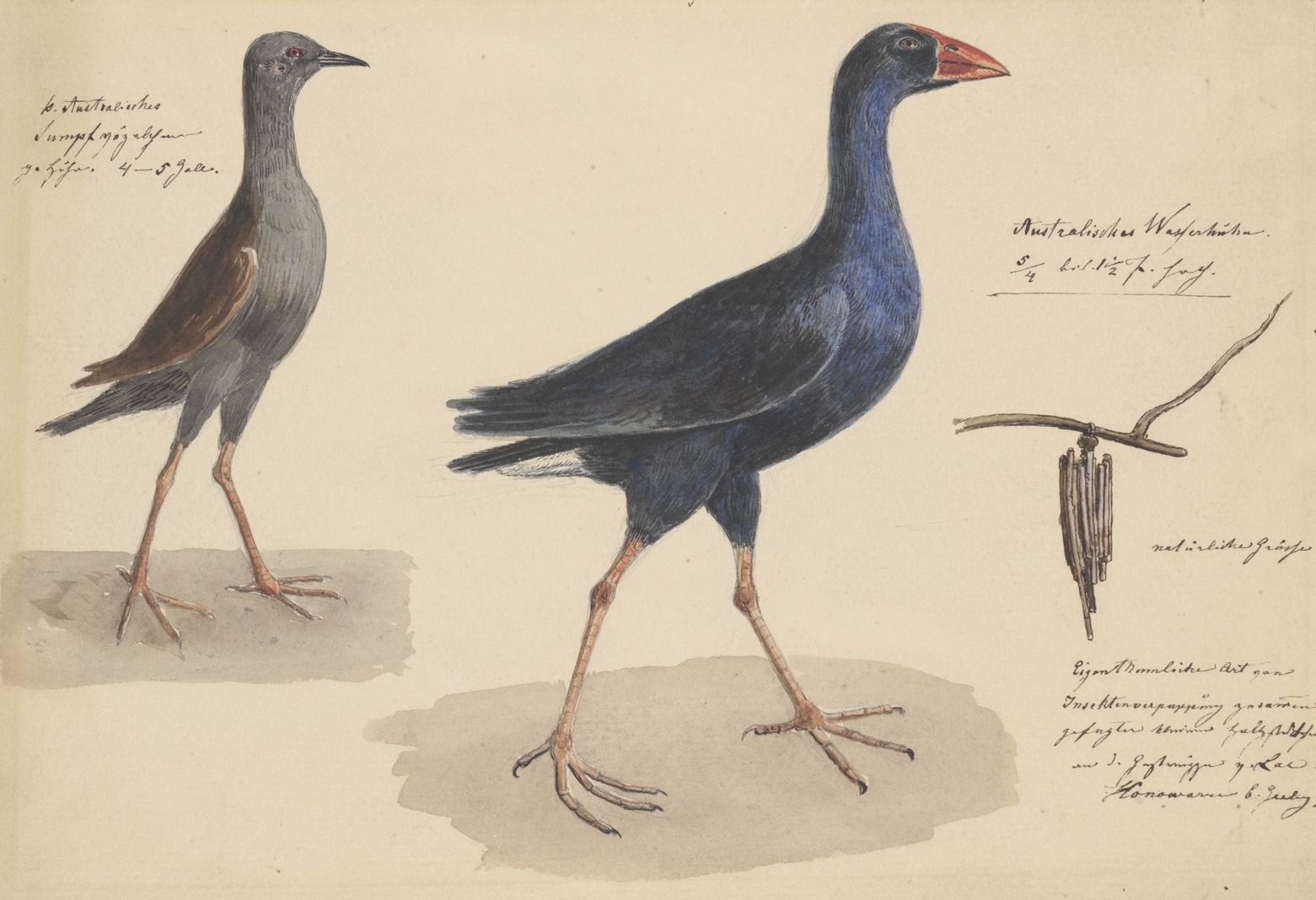
Study of Australian wetland birds, 1854, State Library Victoria

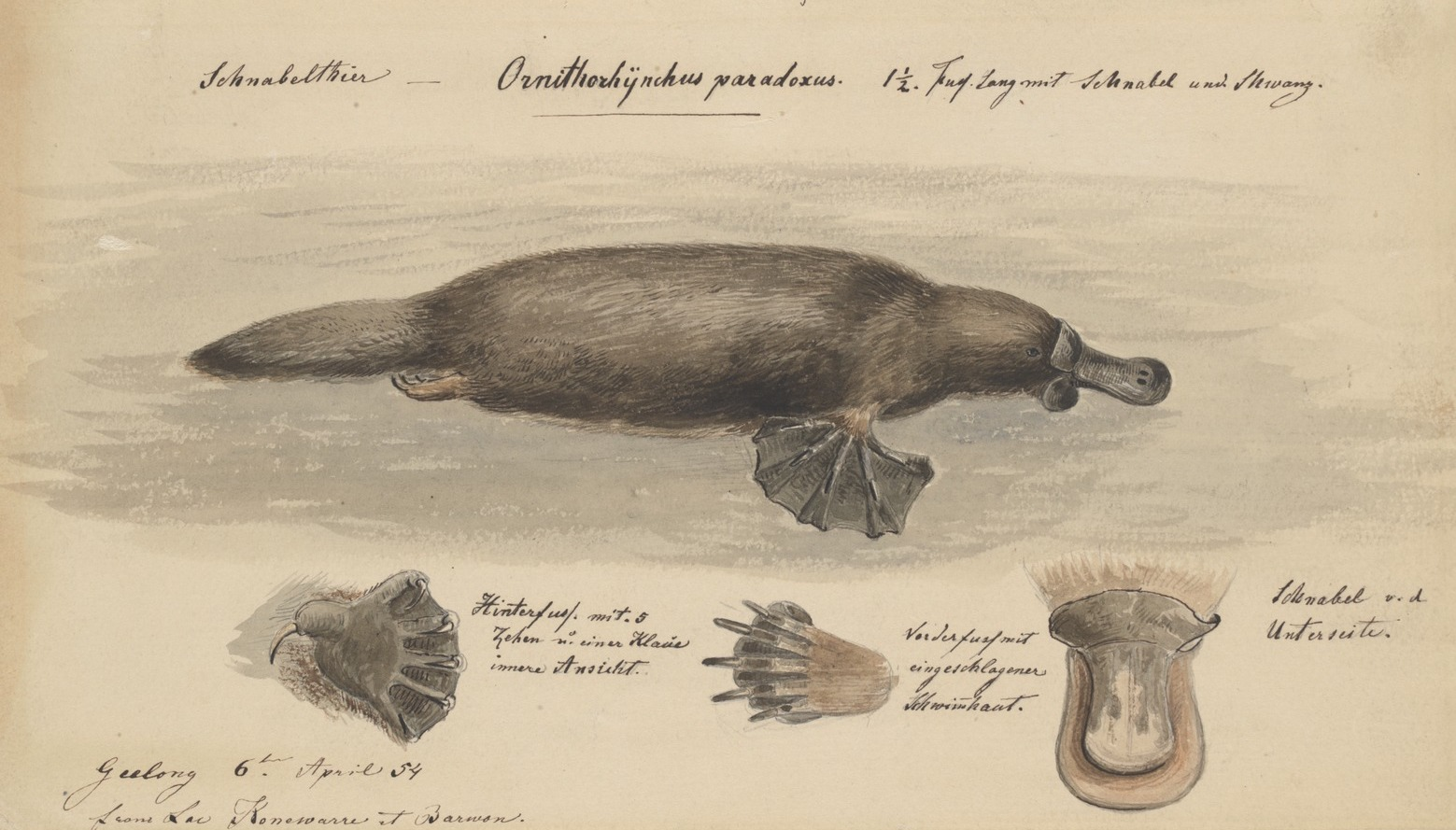
Study of Australian native animals, 1854, State Library Victoria

== Notes ==
Citations
