= Manena =

Manena is a common name for several Hawaiian plants and may refer to:

- Melicope cinerea
- Melicope hawaiensis
