= Melicope ovalis =

Conservation status
- Endangered (IUCN 2.3)

Scientific classification
- Kingdom: Plantae
- Clade: Tracheophytes
- Clade: Angiosperms
- Clade: Eudicots
- Clade: Rosids
- Order: Sapindales
- Family: Rutaceae
- Genus: Melicope
- Species: M. ovalis

Binomial name
- Melicope ovalis (H.St.John) T.G.Hartley & B.C.Stone

Species of tree

Melicope ovalis, the wild pelea or Hana melicope, is a species of tree in the family Rutaceae. It is endemic to Maui, of the Hawaiian Islands.

== Distribution ==
This tree is only present in Kīpahulu Valley in Haleakalā National Park on Maui. It is threatened by the degradation of its habitat due to the presence of feral pigs and introduced species of plants. It is threatened by habitat loss. It is a federally listed endangered species of the United States. Like other Hawaiian Melicope, this species is known as alani.

== Description ==
The Melicope ovalis tree grows up to 5 metres (16 ft) in height. The leathery oval leaves grow up to 16 centimeters long by 10 wide. They have a scent similar to anise when crushed.
