= Melicope mucronulata =

Conservation status
- Critically Endangered (IUCN 2.3)

Scientific classification
- Kingdom: Plantae
- Clade: Tracheophytes
- Clade: Angiosperms
- Clade: Eudicots
- Clade: Rosids
- Order: Sapindales
- Family: Rutaceae
- Genus: Melicope
- Species: M. mucronulata

Binomial name
- Melicope mucronulata (H.St.John) T.G.Hartley & B.C.Stone

Species of flowering plant

Melicope mucronulata is a species of plant in the family Rutaceae. It is endemic to the Hawaiian Islands. It is threatened by habitat loss. It is a federally listed endangered species of the United States. Like other Hawaiian Melicope, this species is known as alani.

This plant has been known from the islands of Maui and Molokai. The Maui population was last seen in 1983, and it is probably extinct. On Molokai there are only three plants left.

The last individuals of the species are threatened by the coffee twig borer (Xylosandrus compactus) and habitat degradation by feral ungulates such as Axis deer.
