= Melicope pallida =

Conservation status
- Endangered (IUCN 2.3)

Scientific classification
- Kingdom: Plantae
- Clade: Tracheophytes
- Clade: Angiosperms
- Clade: Eudicots
- Clade: Rosids
- Order: Sapindales
- Family: Rutaceae
- Genus: Melicope
- Species: M. pallida

Binomial name
- Melicope pallida (Hillebr.) T.G.Hartley & B.C.Stone

Species of tree

Melicope pallida, the pale melicope, is a species of tree in the family Rutaceae. It is endemic to the Hawaiian Islands. It is threatened by habitat loss. It is a federally listed endangered species of the United States. Like other Hawaiian Melicope, this species is known as alani.

This tree grows up to ten meters in height. The leaves have thin oval blades folded along the midline and measuring up to 21 centimeters long by 8 wide. The flowers have yellow-green petals and are borne in cymes in the leaf axils.

Today this plant is limited to the island of Kauai, having been extirpated from Oahu. There are between 200 and 300 individuals remaining. They grow on exposed ridges and cliffs above valleys and near waterfalls. Other plants in the habitat include Alphitonia ponderosa (kauila), Alyxia stellata (maile), Antidesma platyphyllum (hame), Dianella sandwicensis (uki uki), Coprosma waimeae (olena), Dicranopteris linearis (uluhe), Dodonaea viscosa (aalii), Doodia kunthiana (okupukupu), Kadua affinis (manono), Leptecophylla tameiameiae (pukiawe), Melicope anisata (mokihana), and Melicope barbigera (alani).
