= Melicope lydgatei =

Conservation status
- Critically Imperiled (NatureServe)

Scientific classification
- Kingdom: Plantae
- Clade: Tracheophytes
- Clade: Angiosperms
- Clade: Eudicots
- Clade: Rosids
- Order: Sapindales
- Family: Rutaceae
- Genus: Melicope
- Species: M. lydgatei

Binomial name
- Melicope lydgatei (Hillebr.) T.G.Hartley & B.C.Stone

Species of flowering plant

Melicope lydgatei is a rare species of flowering plant in the citrus family known by the common names Koolau Range melicope and Lydgate's pelea. It is endemic to Hawaii, where it is known only from the Koolau Range on the island of Oahu. It is a federally listed endangered species of the United States. Like other Hawaiian Melicope, this species is known as alani.

This is a shrub which grows in wet mountain forests. By 2003 there were 18 populations left. The plant is threatened by the loss and degradation of its habitat, chiefly by the activity of feral pigs and competition from introduced species of plants such as Koster's curse (Clidemia hirta).
