= Melicope haupuensis =

Conservation status
- Critically Endangered (IUCN 3.1)

Scientific classification
- Kingdom: Plantae
- Clade: Tracheophytes
- Clade: Angiosperms
- Clade: Eudicots
- Clade: Rosids
- Order: Sapindales
- Family: Rutaceae
- Genus: Melicope
- Species: M. haupuensis

Binomial name
- Melicope haupuensis (H.St.John) T.G.Hartley & B.C.Stone

Species of tree

Melicope haupuensis is a species of tree in the family Rutaceae known by the common names Haupa Mountain melicope and Pacific pelea. It is endemic to the Hawaiian Islands, where it is known only from the island of Kauai. It is threatened by habitat loss. It is a federally listed endangered species of the United States. Like other Hawaiian Melicope, this species is known as alani.

This is a tree growing to 8 meters in height with inflorescences of 5 to 7 flowers. The species was discovered on Haupu Ridge on Kauai in 1927 and described to science in 1944. By 1994 there were only two plants known to remain, and by 2003 there were thirteen, including specimens located within Nā Pali Coast State Park. A 2008 survey found 30 individuals in three populations.

This tree grows in moist forest habitat. It is threatened by the degradation of this habitat by the activity of animals such as deer and rats, and by the presence of non-native plant species such as lantana (Lantana camara), thimbleberry (Rubus argutus), and kahili ginger (Hedychium gardnerianum).
