= Melicope incana =

Conservation status
- Least Concern (IUCN 3.1)

Scientific classification
- Kingdom: Plantae
- Clade: Tracheophytes
- Clade: Angiosperms
- Clade: Eudicots
- Clade: Rosids
- Order: Sapindales
- Family: Rutaceae
- Genus: Melicope
- Species: M. incana

Binomial name
- Melicope incana T.G.Hartley

Synonyms
- Ampacus alba (Hook.f.) Kuntze; Euodia alba Hook.f.

Species of tree

Melicope incana is a tree in the family Rutaceae. It is native to maritime Southeast Asia.

== Description ==
Melicope incana grows up to 35 m (110 ft) tall. The almost leathery leaves are obovate or elliptic to ovate and measure up to 25 cm (10 in) long and 18 cm (7 in) wide. The inflorescences are axillary and feature unisexual flowers, occasionally bisexual, with white petals. The species is most closely related to Melicope hookeri, differing mainly in the smooth (or glabrous) quality of M. incana's leaves.

== Taxonomy ==
Melicope incana was described in 1994 by the American botanist Thomas Gordon Hartley. The type specimen was collected in Borneo in 1857 and was initially described as Euodia alba by the British botanist Joseph Dalton Hooker. On transfer to the genus Melicope, the specific epithet alba was already in use; incana was used instead, meaning 'grey-white hairy', referring to the leaves.

== Distribution and habitat ==
Melicope incana is native to Borneo, Sumatra and Sulawesi. Its habitat is in primary and secondary forests, sometimes in swamps, at elevations to 800 m (2,600 ft).

== Conservation ==
Melicope incana has been assessed as least concern on the IUCN Red List. The species has a broad distribution and is not currently facing any significant threats.
