= Melicope reflexa =

Conservation status
- Critically Imperiled (NatureServe)

Scientific classification
- Kingdom: Plantae
- Clade: Tracheophytes
- Clade: Angiosperms
- Clade: Eudicots
- Clade: Rosids
- Order: Sapindales
- Family: Rutaceae
- Genus: Melicope
- Species: M. reflexa

Binomial name
- Melicope reflexa (H.St.John) T.G.Hartley & B.C.Stone

Species of flowering plant

Melicope reflexa, the reflexed pelea or lava melicope, is a species of flowering plant in the family Rutaceae. It is endemic to Hawaii, where it is found only on the island of Molokai. Like other Hawaiian Melicope, this species is known as alani. It is a federally listed endangered species of the United States.

This is a shrub growing 1 to 3 meters tall. It grows in wet forest habitat on Molokai, where it is known to exist at only four locations. The total number of plants is estimated to be under 1000. It is threatened by the degradation of its habitat by feral ungulates such as deer, goats, and pigs, and non-native plant species.
