= Melicope haleakalae =

Conservation status
- Endangered (IUCN 3.1)

Scientific classification
- Kingdom: Plantae
- Clade: Tracheophytes
- Clade: Angiosperms
- Clade: Eudicots
- Clade: Rosids
- Order: Sapindales
- Family: Rutaceae
- Genus: Melicope
- Species: M. haleakalae

Binomial name
- Melicope haleakalae (B.C.Stone) T.G.Hartley & B.C.Stone

Species of flowering plant

Melicope haleakalae, or the Haleakala melicope, is a species of plant in the family Rutaceae. It is endemic to the Hawaiian Islands. It grows in wet forests. As with other Hawaiian Melicope species, this species is known as alani.

== Description ==
M. haleakalae grows in shrubs or small trees of 6.6–10 feet (2.0–3.0 m) tall, with new growth being glabrous or with scattered hairs. Its leaves are whorled and simple, with 4 leaves per node. Its blades are obovate to spatulate, with maximum dimensions of 6.4 inches (16 cm) in length and 2.4 inches (6.1 cm) wide. The petioles are 10–15 mm long, with no stipules. Its flowers are characterized as glabrous, fasciculate cymes below the leaves, with peduncles 0–1 mm long, and pedicels 1–3.5 mm long. Fruit capsules are of 12–13 mm wide, with 1–2 seeds per carpel, measuring 4–4.5 mm long, being glossy black when ripe, and shaped as crustaceous and ovoid, but sometimes angled due to compression. M. haleakalae has ramiflorous cymes arising on stems below the leaves, a shared characteristic with M. clusiifolia and M. waialealae, and its inflorescences are also ramiflorous.

M. haleakalae is endemic to the island of Maui in Hawaii.

== Phylogeny ==
M. haleakalae, along with other Hawaiian Melicope species, came from the Pelea clade in the Acronychia–Melicope group, which originated during the Late and Middle Miocene (8.5–16.9 Ma). Further phylogeny analysis within the Hawaiian species resolved its placement as paraphyletic to M. clusiifolia, an probably regarded as conspecific due to it being deeply nested within M. clusiifolia.
