= Melicope munroi =

Conservation status
- Critically Imperiled (NatureServe)

Scientific classification
- Kingdom: Plantae
- Clade: Tracheophytes
- Clade: Angiosperms
- Clade: Eudicots
- Clade: Rosids
- Order: Sapindales
- Family: Rutaceae
- Genus: Melicope
- Species: M. munroi

Binomial name
- Melicope munroi (H.St.John) T.G.Hartley & B.C.Stone

Species of flowering plant

Melicope munroi is a rare species of flowering plant in the family Rutaceae known by the common names lanahale and Munro's pelea. It is endemic to Hawaii, where it is known only from the island of Lanai. It is a federally listed endangered species of the United States. Like other Hawaiian Melicope, this species is known as alani.

This is a shrub which grows up to 3 meters tall with oval leaves up to 11 centimeters long by 7.5 wide. Today the plant is only found on Lanai, and it has been extirpated from Molokai. It is threatened by the degradation of its habitat by deer and introduced species of plants.
