= Melicope stonei =

Scientific classification
- Kingdom: Plantae
- Clade: Tracheophytes
- Clade: Angiosperms
- Clade: Eudicots
- Clade: Rosids
- Order: Sapindales
- Family: Rutaceae
- Genus: Melicope
- Species: M. stonei

Binomial name
- Melicope stonei K.R. Wood, Appelhans & W.L. Wagner

Endangered tree endemic to Kaua'i, Hawaii

Melicope stonei is an endemic tree species discovered on Kauaʻi, Hawaiian Islands. It is a Critically Endangered (CR) single island endemic species.

== Description ==
Melicope stonei is a tree up to 12 m (39 ft) tall, with trunks up to 25 cm (9.8 in) diameter, bark smooth, mottled gray to light brown, new growth and young branchlets tomentose, yellow-tan, glabrate in age. Leaves are opposite, unifoliolate, coriaceous, and elliptic. Inflorescences in axillary and ramiflorous, fasciculate cymes to 22 mm (0.87 in) long. Flowers are male or female, plants monoecious, 3–5 (–7), sepals deltoid-ovate. Capsules medium to dark green when fresh, irregularly pusticulate, 5–9 mm (0.20–0.35 in) × 15–21 mm (0.59–0.83 in), of 4 distinct follicles, slightly ascending, occasionally 1 or more abortive, exocarp glabrous, glandular punctate, endocarp glabrous. Seeds are 1–2 per carpel, ovoid, 6–8 mm (0.24–0.31 in) long. Melicope stonei has been observed with flower buds in January, may, and September, and with both flower and fruit during January, February, and July.

== Etymology ==
Melicope stonei is named in honor of Benjamin Clemens Masterman Stone, British-American botanist, born in Shanghai, China (1933–1994). While working at the Philippine National Museum on the Flora of the Philippines Project. The earliest known collections of Melicope stonei were made by David Lorence and Timothy Flynn (National Tropical Botanical Garden) as far back as February 1988 within the forests of Mākaha Valley, Kauaʻi.
