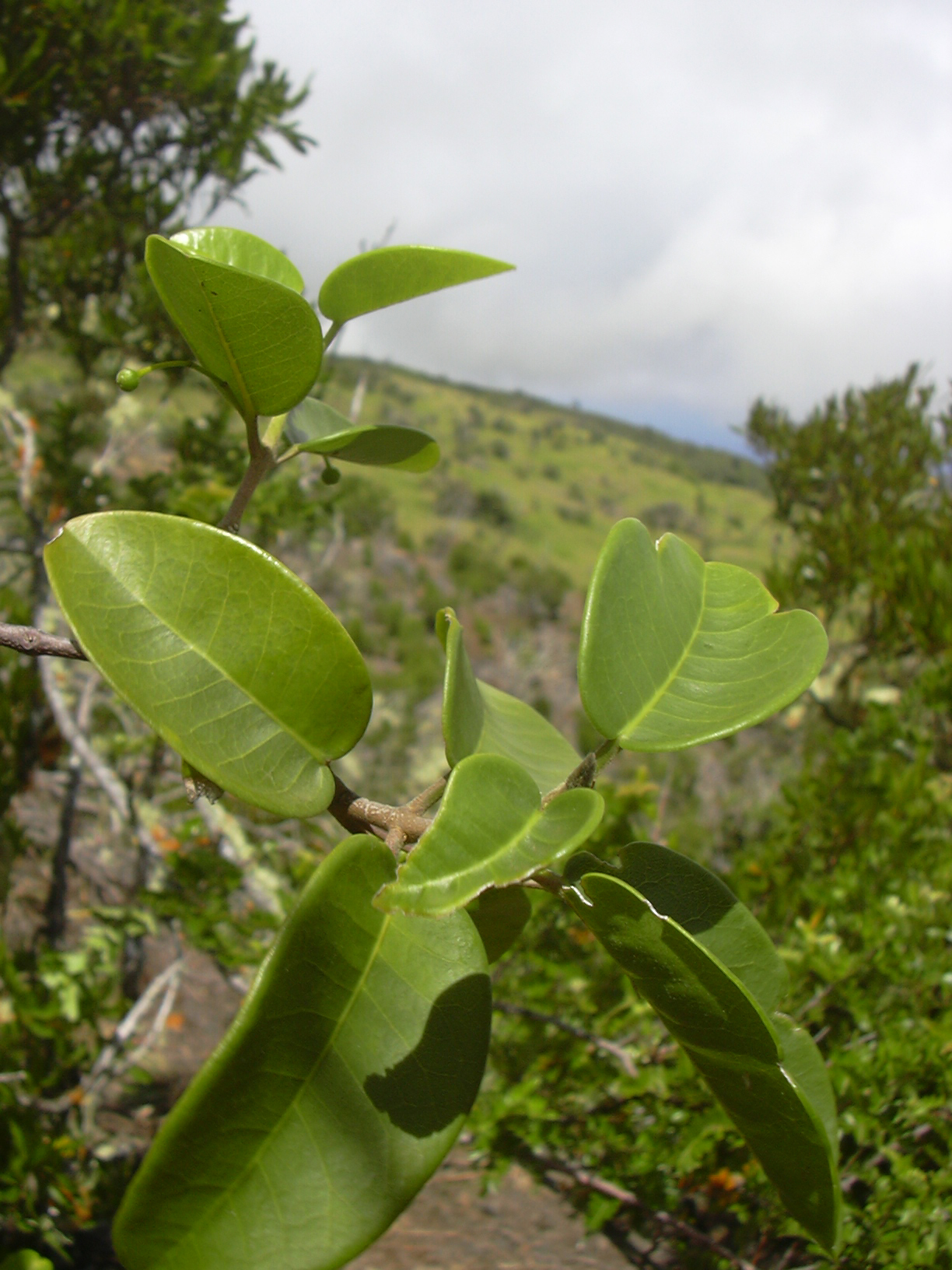

Conservation status
- Critically Imperiled (NatureServe)

Scientific classification
- Kingdom: Plantae
- Clade: Tracheophytes
- Clade: Angiosperms
- Clade: Eudicots
- Clade: Rosids
- Order: Sapindales
- Family: Rutaceae
- Genus: Melicope
- Species: M. adscendens

Binomial name
- Melicope adscendens (H.St.John & Hume) T.G.Hartley & B.C.Stone

= Melicope adscendens =

Species of flowering plant

Melicope adscendens is a rare species of flowering plant in the citrus family known by the common name auwahi melicope. It is endemic to Hawaii, where it is known only from the island of Maui. It is a federally listed endangered species of the United States. Like other Hawaiian Melicope, this species is known as alani.

== Description ==
M. adscendens grows as a sprawling shrub with long, slender branching stems and inflorescences of 1 to 3 flowers. Its leaves are 1.5–6.5 × 1–4 cm in dimension, without a densely tomentose abaxial leaf surface, and are minutely puberulent, becoming glabrate. New growth is characterized as with densely covered in yellowish to golden-brown puberulence. It grows in degraded forest habitat on the slopes of the volcano Haleakalā. There is a single plant on state-owned property, and perhaps 25 more on private property. The solitary plant on state land is protected in an enclosure in the Kanaio Natural Area Reserve, and it is producing fruit. None of the other plants have been observed reproducing.

== Phylogeny ==
M. adscendens, along with other Hawaiian Melicope species, came from the Pelea clade in the Acronychia–Melicope group, which originated during the Late and Middle Miocene (8.5–16.9 Ma). Among Hawaiian species, M. adscendens was identified in a clade to be migrated from Kaua’i to Maui, whilst other species in its clade diversified within Kaua’i.

== Usage ==
This plant is threatened by the loss and degradation of its habitat. The slopes of the volcano are used as pastures for grazing cattle, and various types of feral ungulates are present, such as feral pigs, Axis deer, and feral goats. Many species of non-native plants are present in the area, including balloon plant (Asclepias physocarpa), beggarticks (Bidens pilosa), lantana (Lantana camara), prickly pear (Opuntia ficus-indica), and kikuyu grass (Pennisetum clandestinum).
