= Melicope degeneri =

Conservation status
- Critically Imperiled (NatureServe)

Scientific classification
- Kingdom: Plantae
- Clade: Tracheophytes
- Clade: Angiosperms
- Clade: Eudicots
- Clade: Rosids
- Order: Sapindales
- Family: Rutaceae
- Genus: Melicope
- Species: M. degeneri

Binomial name
- Melicope degeneri (B.C.Stone) T.G.Hartley & B.C.Stone

Species of flowering plant

Melicope degeneri is a rare species of flowering plant in the family Rutaceae known by the common names Kokee Stream melicope and Degener's pelea. It is endemic to Hawaii, where it is known only from the island of Kauai. It is a federally listed endangered species of the United States. Like other Hawaiian Melicope, this species is known as alani.

== Taxonomy ==
M. degeneri was described by B. C. Stone in 1966 as Pelea degeneri. Hartley and Stone in 1989 later re-classified Pelea degeneri into Melicope.

== Description ==
M. degeneri grows as shrubs or trees up to 35 feet (11 m), making it as one of the largest among Hawaiian Melicope species. Leaves are oppositely arranged, and shaped as elliptic-obovate blades with maximum dimensions of 8.2 inches (21 cm) in length and 3.36 inches (8.5 cm) wide. Flowers are usually in clusters of three with length up to 10 inches (25 cm), characterized as yellowish brown tomentose axillary cymes up to 2.18 inches (5.5 cm) long. Fruits are cube-shaped capsules of 7–9 mm long and 7–12 mm wide, with one or two seeds per cell, measuring about 4.5 mm, characterized as glossy black when ripe, crustaceous, and ovoid-shaped, but sometimes angled from compression.

It grows in wet mountain forests. The rediscovered population since 1993 grows in altitudes of 2,450–3,700 feet (750–1,130 m), with growth restricted in forests dominated by Metrosideros.

== Preservation ==
The type specimen of this plant was collected in 1926. The species was not seen again and was thought to be extinct until it was rediscovered in 1993, through a research initiative by National Tropical Botanical Garden (NTBG) for their Pacific Island floristic inventories. Today there are 22 or 23 known individuals throughout Kauai, with places of discovery include Pohakuao, Hanakoa, Koai‘e and Wainiha. This plant is threatened by the degradation of its habitat by the activity of feral goats and pigs and competition with non-native plants. Its seeds are now stored in NTBG's herbarium for possible preservation by last-resort germination.
