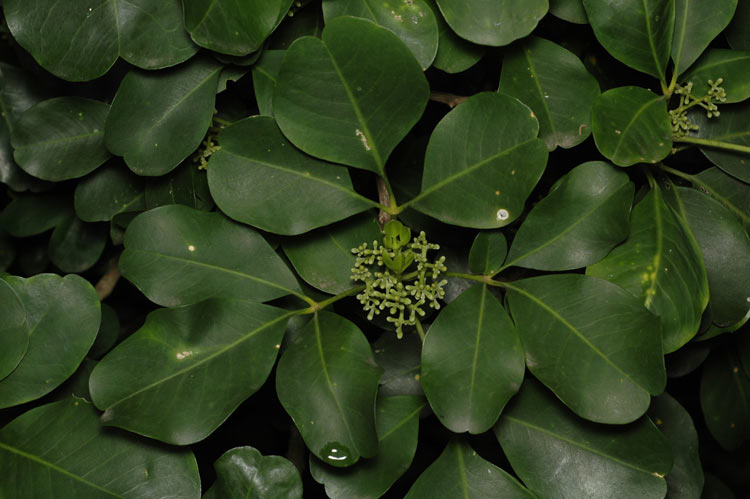

Scientific classification
- Kingdom: Plantae
- Clade: Tracheophytes
- Clade: Angiosperms
- Clade: Eudicots
- Clade: Rosids
- Order: Sapindales
- Family: Rutaceae
- Genus: Melicope
- Species: M. polybotrya

Binomial name
- Melicope polybotrya (C.Moore & F.Muell.) T.G.Hartley

Synonyms
- Ampacus polybotrya (C.Moore & F.Muell.) Kuntze nom. illeg.; Ampacus polybotrys Kuntze orth. var.; Euodia polybotrya C.Moore & F.Muell.

= Melicope polybotrya =

Species of shrub

Melicope polybotrya is a species of shrub or small tree in the family Rutaceae and is endemic to Lord Howe Island. It has trifoliate leaves and green flowers borne in short panicles in leaf axils.

== Description ==
Melicope polybotrya is a shrub or tree that typically grows to a height of 3–9 mm (0.12–0.35 in). The leaves are arranged in opposite pairs and trifoliate on a petiole 20–70 mm (0.79–2.76 in) long. The leaflets are more or less round to broadly egg-shaped with the narrower end towards the base, 70–120 mm (2.8–4.7 in) long and 70–90 mm (2.8–3.5 in) wide on a petiolule 7–25 mm (0.28–0.98 in) long. The flowers are arranged in panicles 25–50 mm (0.98–1.97 in) long and 15–30 mm (0.59–1.18 in) wide with several to many flowers. The plants are dioecious, with male and female flowers on separate plants. The sepals are 0.5–1 mm (0.020–0.039 in) long and the petals are green, 2–2.5 mm (0.079–0.098 in) long. Flowering occurs in summer and the fruit consists of four follicles 5–6.5 mm (0.20–0.26 in) long and fused at the base, containing spherical black seeds.

== Taxonomy ==
This species was first formally described in 1871 by Charles Moore and Ferdinand von Mueller who gave it the name Euodia polybotrya. The description was published in Fragmenta phytographiae Australiae from specimens collected on Mount Lidgbird. In 2001, Thomas Gordon Hartley changed the name to Melicope polybotrya in the journal Allertonia. The specific epithet comes from the Greek polys (“many”) and botrys (“bunch”), referring to the clusters of flowers in the type specimen.

== Distribution and habitat ==
Melicope polybotrya grows in sheltered forest and is relatively common, especially at lower elevations and is endemic to Lord Howe Island.
