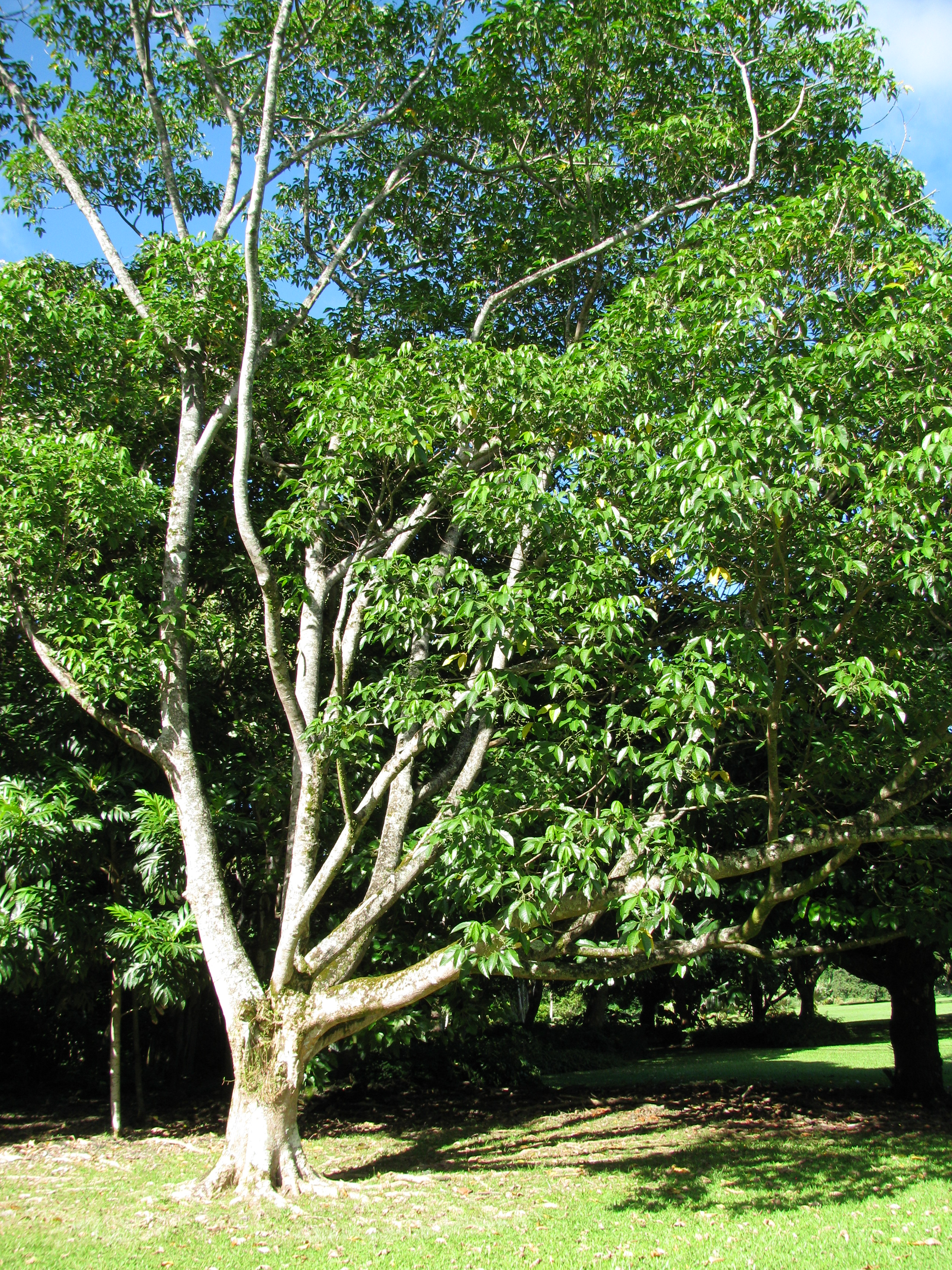

Conservation status
- Least Concern (IUCN 3.1)

Scientific classification
- Kingdom: Plantae
- Clade: Embryophytes
- Clade: Tracheophytes
- Clade: Angiosperms
- Clade: Eudicots
- Clade: Rosids
- Order: Sapindales
- Family: Rutaceae
- Genus: Melicope
- Species: M. latifolia

Binomial name
- Melicope latifolia (DC.) T.G.Hartley

Synonyms
- Ampacus latifolia (DC.) Kuntze; Euodia latifolia DC.; Zanthoxylum latifolium (DC.) G.Don; Euodia bintoco Blanco; Euodia mindanaensis Merr.; Euodia peekelii Lauterb.; Euodia samoensis Christoph.; Euodia silvatica Merr. & L.M.Perry; Euodia solomonensis Merr. & L.M.Perry; Euodia viridiflora C.T.White; Zanthoxylum lanuginosum Kostel.; Zanthoxylum rumphianum Cham.

= Melicope latifolia =

Species of plant

Melicope latifolia is a space of flowering plant in the family Rutaceae. The specific epithet latifolia means 'broad-leaved'.

== Description ==
Melicope latifolia grows up as a shrub or tree to 30 metres (100 ft) tall. Inflorescences are often dense and measure up to 24 cm (9 in) long. The fruits are elliptic and measure up to 0.45 cm (0.2 in) long.

== Distribution and habitat ==
Melicope latifolia is native to Myanmar, Malesia, Papuasia, Samoa, the Santa Cruz Islands, and Vanuatu. In Sabah (Borneo) its habitat is forests and open places from sea-level to 600 metres (2,000 ft) elevation.

== Uses ==
In Peninsular Malaysia and Indonesia, the plant's leaves have been used in the treatment of cramps and fevers. In Indonesia, the plant's resin has been used as a varnish or adhesive.
