= Melicope makahae =

Conservation status
- Endangered (IUCN 2.3)

Scientific classification
- Kingdom: Plantae
- Clade: Tracheophytes
- Clade: Angiosperms
- Clade: Eudicots
- Clade: Rosids
- Order: Sapindales
- Family: Rutaceae
- Genus: Melicope
- Species: M. makahae

Binomial name
- Melicope makahae (B.C.Stone) T.G.Hartley & B.C.Stone

Species of flowering plant

Melicope makahae, the Makaha Valley melicope, is a species of plant in the family Rutaceae. It is a perennial shrub or tree that grows up to 10 ft (3.0 m) tall.

It is endemic to the Waianae Range on Oahu island, in Hawaii. It is found in mesic forests.

It is threatened by habitat loss from invasive plants as well as feral goats and pigs.
