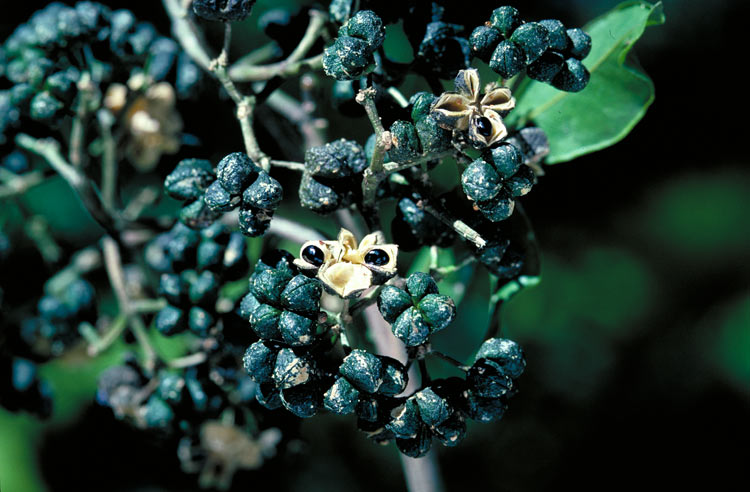
- Fruit

Scientific classification
- Kingdom: Plantae
- Clade: Tracheophytes
- Clade: Angiosperms
- Clade: Eudicots
- Clade: Rosids
- Order: Sapindales
- Family: Rutaceae
- Genus: Melicope
- Species: M. jonesii

Binomial name
- Melicope jonesii T.G.Hartley

= Melicope jonesii =

Species of tree

Melicope jonesii is a species of tree in the family Rutaceae and is endemic to north-east Queensland. It has trifoliate leaves and greenish or cream-coloured flowers borne in short panicles in leaf axils.

== Description ==
Melicope jonesii is a tree that typically grows to a height of 35 m (115 ft). The leaves are arranged in opposite pairs and trifoliate on a petiole 50–110 mm (2.0–4.3 in) long. The leaflets are elliptical, 100–175 mm (3.9–6.9 in) long and 40–80 mm (1.6–3.1 in) wide. The flowers are arranged in panicles 20–35 mm (0.79–1.38 in) long in leaf axils and are bisexual, the sepals round and about 1 mm (0.039 in) long and fused at the base, the petals greenish or cream-coloured, 4–5 mm (0.16–0.20 in) long and there are four stamens. Flowering has been recorded in January and February and the fruit consists of up to four follicles 8–10 mm (0.31–0.39 in) long and fused at the base containing shiny black seeds.

== Taxonomy ==
Melicope jonesii was first formally described in 2001 by Thomas Gordon Hartley in the journal Allertonia from specimens collected in 1979 by Bruce Gray. The specific epithet (jonesii) honours the botanist William T. Jones (1908–1970).

== Distribution and habitat ==
This melicope grows in rainforest at altitudes of 720–1,000 m (2,360–3,280 ft) from near the Daintree National Park to near the Ella Bay National Park.

== Conservation status ==
This species is classified as of "least concern" under the Queensland Government Nature Conservation Act 1992.
