= Melicope wawraeana =

Conservation status
- Vulnerable (IUCN 2.3)

Scientific classification
- Kingdom: Plantae
- Clade: Tracheophytes
- Clade: Angiosperms
- Clade: Eudicots
- Clade: Rosids
- Order: Sapindales
- Family: Rutaceae
- Genus: Melicope
- Species: M. wawraeana

Binomial name
- Melicope wawraeana (Rock) T.G.Hartley & B.C.Stone

Species of flowering plant

Melicope wawraeana, the Monoa melicope, is a species of plant in the family Rutaceae. It is endemic to the Hawaiian Islands.
