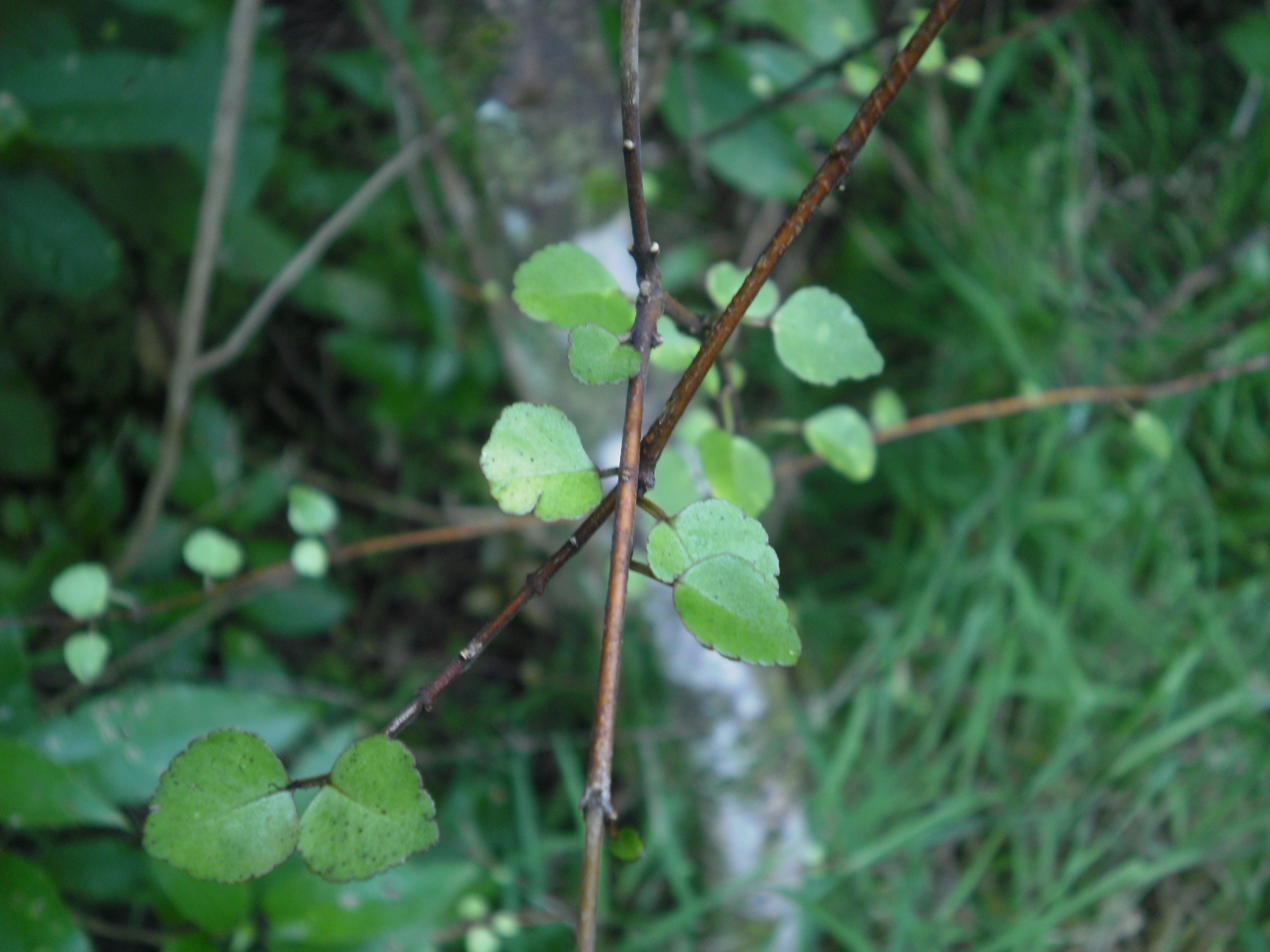

Scientific classification
- Kingdom: Plantae
- Clade: Tracheophytes
- Clade: Angiosperms
- Clade: Eudicots
- Clade: Rosids
- Order: Sapindales
- Family: Rutaceae
- Genus: Melicope
- Species: M. simplex

Binomial name
- Melicope simplex A.Cunn.

= Melicope simplex =

Species of shrub

Melicope simplex is a shrub in the family Rutaceae that is native to New Zealand.

Melicope simplex, commonly known as poataniwha, is a shrub growing to 4 metres (13 ft) high. It has small, 1 to 2 centimetres (0.39 to 0.79 in) long serrated leaves, and produces white flowers followed by tiny black seeds.
