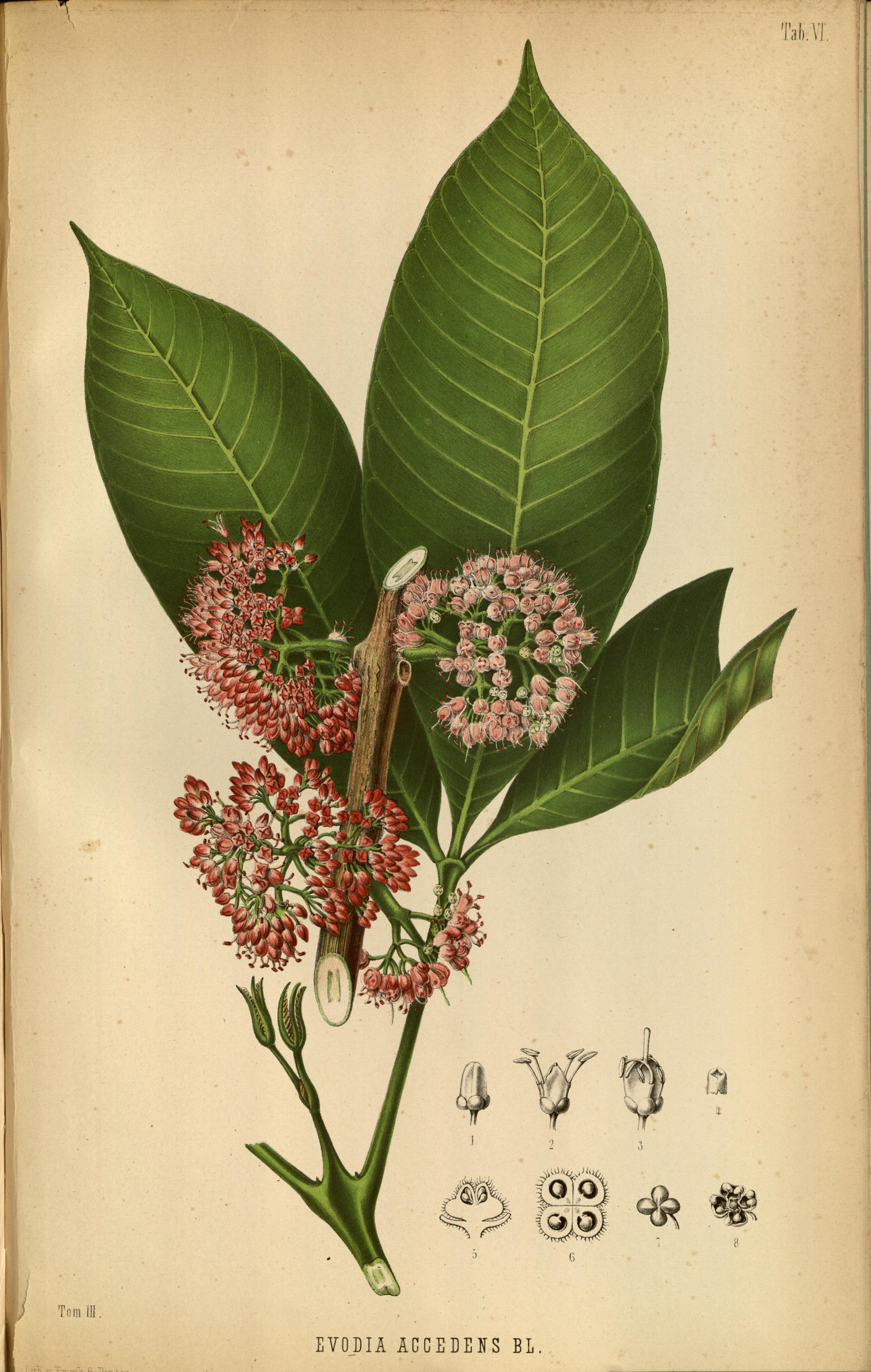

Conservation status
- Least Concern (IUCN 3.1)

Scientific classification
- Kingdom: Plantae
- Clade: Tracheophytes
- Clade: Angiosperms
- Clade: Eudicots
- Clade: Rosids
- Order: Sapindales
- Family: Rutaceae
- Genus: Melicope
- Species: M. accedens

Binomial name
- Melicope accedens (Blume) T.G.Hartley

Synonyms
- Ampacus accedens (Blume) Kuntze; Euodia accedens Blume; Zanthoxylum accedens (Blume) Miq.; Ampacus macrophylla (Blume) Kuntze; Euodia calophylla Guillaumin; Euodia macrophylla Blume; Euodia megistophylla Merr.; Euodia nervosa Koord. & Valeton; Euodia parkinsonii K.Narayanan & M.P.Nayar; Euodia pasteuriana A.Chev. ex Guillaumin; Euodia pilulifera King

= Melicope accedens =

Species of flowering plant

Melicope accedens is a plant in the family Rutaceae, which grows in Indo–China and Malesia. Local names include kulampapa, pahau, and pau in Borneo.

== Taxonomy ==
M. accedens was initially described as Euodia macrophylla and E. accedens by Blume in 1825. It was later combined by Miquel in 1867 as E. accedens. It was then reclassified as M. accedens by T. G. Hartley in 1994.

== Description ==
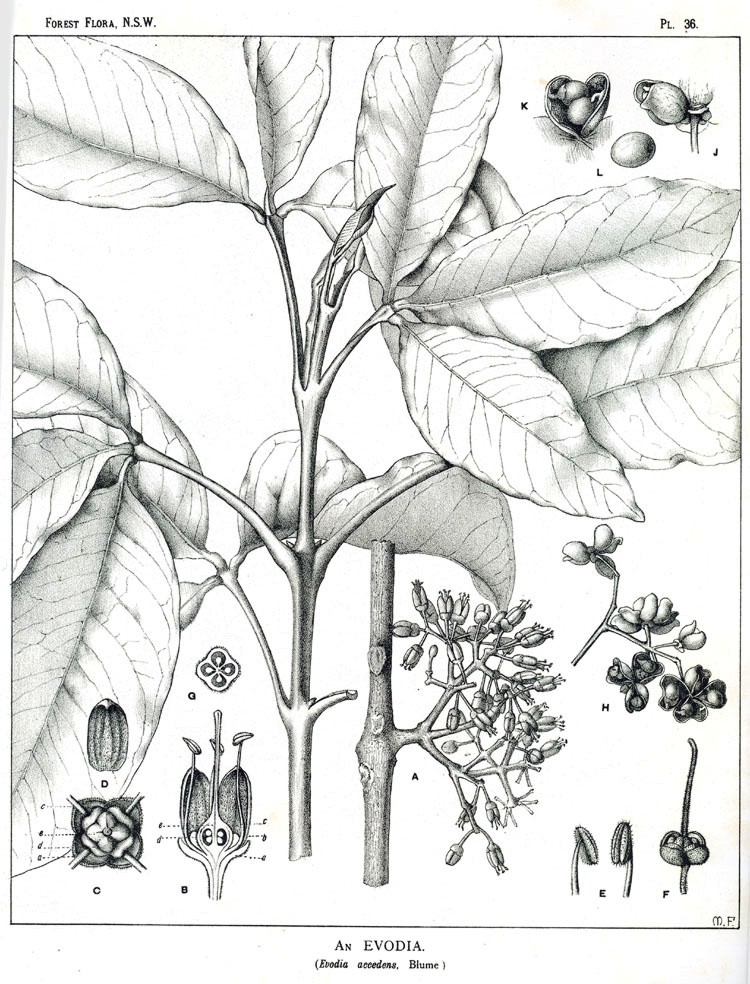
Melicope accedens00

M. accedens grows up as a shrub or tree to 40 metres (130 ft) tall. The fruits are roundish to ellipsoid to obovoid and measure up to 0.5 cm (0.2 in) long. Its leaves are opposite trifofoliate, with occasional unifoliolate structure, with length of 12–74 cm. Its inflorescences are axillary, and several- to densely many-flowered. The petals are white to green or pale yellow. Its fruiting carpels are connate at base and divergent, being 3–7 mm long, with its seeds are funiculus, 0.3–1.5 mm in length.

== Distribution and habitat ==
Melicope accedens grows naturally from the Andaman Islands to Indochina and in Peninsular Malaysia, Java and Borneo. In Malaysian Borneo its habitat is forests, including peat swamps and open places, from sea-level to 1,950 metres (6,400 ft) altitude. It has also been identified in Sumatra.

== Phylogeny ==
M. accedens was identified as part of the Lepta clade in the Acronychia–Melicope group, which originated from 6.2–14.1 Ma.

== Medicinal usage ==
M. accedens leaves is used in Indonesia and Malaysia to decrease fever, and was applied externally. A pharmacological research suggested this action through methanol anti-inflammatory activities. M. accedens was found to not have antimicrobial activities to common pathogens such as S. aureus and E. coli.
