= Melicope peninsularis =

Scientific classification
- Kingdom: Plantae
- Clade: Tracheophytes
- Clade: Angiosperms
- Clade: Eudicots
- Clade: Rosids
- Order: Sapindales
- Family: Rutaceae
- Genus: Melicope
- Species: M. peninsularis

Binomial name
- Melicope peninsularis T.G.Hartley

Species of tree

Melicope peninsularis is a species of small tree in the family Rutaceae and is endemic to tropical north Queensland. It has trifoliate leaves and white flowers borne in short panicles in leaf axils.

== Description ==
Melicope peninsularis is a tree that typically grows to a height of 10 mm (0.39 in) and has a slender trunk. The leaves are arranged in opposite pairs and trifoliate on a petiole 40–120 mm (1.6–4.7 in) long. The leaflets are sessile, elliptical, 90–170 mm (3.5–6.7 in) long and 45–70 mm (1.8–2.8 in) wide. The flowers are arranged in panicles about 40 mm (1.6 in) long in leaf axils and are bisexual and the sepals about 2.5 mm (0.098 in) long and fused at the base, the petals white, 5–6 mm (0.20–0.24 in) long and there are four stamens. Flowering has been recorded in February and the fruit consists of four follicles 8–12 mm (0.31–0.47 in) long and fused at the base.

== Taxonomy ==
Melicope peninsularis was first formally described in 2001 by Thomas Gordon Hartley in the journal Allertonia from specimens collected in the Lockerbie Scrub in 1992.

== Distribution and habitat ==
This melicope grows in rainforest and is only known from the tip of Cape York Peninsula and on Darnley Island in the Torres Strait.

== Conservation status ==
This species is classified as of "least concern" under the Queensland Government Nature Conservation Act 1992.
