= Melicope affinis =

Scientific classification
- Kingdom: Plantae
- Clade: Tracheophytes
- Clade: Angiosperms
- Clade: Eudicots
- Clade: Rosids
- Order: Sapindales
- Family: Rutaceae
- Genus: Melicope
- Species: M. affinis

Binomial name
- Melicope affinis T.G.Hartley

Species of shrub

Melicope affinis is a species of shrub or tree in the family Rutaceae and is endemic to Queensland. It has trifoliate leaves and small greenish white flowers borne in panicles in leaf axils.

== Description ==
Melicope affinis is a tree that typically grows to a height of 20 mm (0.79 in) but also forms flowers and fruit as a shrub. The leaves are trifoliate and arranged in opposite pairs on a petiole 20–75 mm (0.79–2.95 in) long, the leaflets usually elliptical, 60–100 mm (2.4–3.9 in) long and 25–40 mm (0.98–1.57 in) wide, the end leaflet on a petiolule 2–10 mm (0.079–0.394 in) long. The flowers are bisexual and arranged in panicles 30–60 mm (1.2–2.4 in) or long in leaf axils. The sepals are egg-shaped to round, about 0.8 mm (0.031 in) long and fused at the base. The petals are greenish white, about 2 mm (0.079 in) long and glabrous and there are four stamens. Flowering has been observed in March and the fruit consists of up to four follicles 3.5–4 mm (0.14–0.16 in) long.

== Taxonomy ==
Melicope affinis was first formally described in 2001 by Thomas Gordon Hartley in the journal Allertonia from specimens collected by Bruce Gray in 1979.

== Distribution and habitat ==
This melicope is found between Cooktown and Cairns in far north Queensland where it grows in rather dry rainforest at altitudes between 560 and 900 m (1,840 and 2,950 ft).

== Conservation status ==
This species is classified as of "least concern" under the Queensland Government Nature Conservation Act 1992.
