= Melicope macropus =

Conservation status
- Extinct (IUCN 3.1)

Scientific classification
- Kingdom: Plantae
- Clade: Tracheophytes
- Clade: Angiosperms
- Clade: Eudicots
- Clade: Rosids
- Order: Sapindales
- Family: Rutaceae
- Genus: Melicope
- Species: †M. macropus

Binomial name
- †Melicope macropus (Hillebr.) T.G.Hartley & B.C.Stone

Extinct species of flowering plant

Melicope macropus, the Kaholuamanu melicope, was a species of plant in the citrus family, Rutaceae.

It is extinct, and was endemic to the Hawaiian Islands.
