= Melicope cruciata =

Conservation status
- Critically Endangered (IUCN 3.1)

Scientific classification
- Kingdom: Plantae
- Clade: Tracheophytes
- Clade: Angiosperms
- Clade: Eudicots
- Clade: Rosids
- Order: Sapindales
- Family: Rutaceae
- Genus: Melicope
- Species: M. cruciata

Binomial name
- Melicope cruciata (Heller) T.G. Hartley & B.C. Stone

Species of flowering plant

Melicope cruciata, also called pilo 'ula or cross-bearing pelea, is a species of plant in the family Rutaceae. It is endemic to the Hawaiian Islands, specifically in Kaua'i.

== Taxonomy ==
M. cruciata was firstly described by Heller as Pelea cruciata by Heller in 1896. The genus later reclassified by Hartley and Stone as Melicope in 1989.

== Description ==
Melicope cruciata grows in trees up to 15 feet (4.6 m) tall, with opposite, elliptic to oblong‐elliptic or elliptic‐ovate leaves with maximum dimensions of 6.8 inches (17 cm) in length and 3.8 inches (9.7 cm) wide. Inflorescences are axillary, usually with 5 to 9 flowers. Capsules are green in color, about 24–34 mm wide, with connate carpels one-fourth their length, equivalent to 12–17 mm long. Seeds are 7.5 mm in length. Its endocarp is described as densely and uniformly short-villous.

M. cruciata is endemic to the island of Kaua'i, with all specimens have been collected on the west side of the island and on the high central plateau, and grows on wet forests and shrublands on elevations above 3,300 feet (1,000 m). Around 20 to 30 plants were discovered on the plateau, although the number is tentative due to the difficulty of distinguishing it with other related species. Another count by Wood in 2007 identified M. cruciata at the La'au Ridge, the Namolokama plateau, and the Wai'ale'ale summit region, with a total population of up to 130 trees.

== Phylogeny ==
M. cruciata, along with other Hawaiian Melicope species, came from the Pelea clade in the Acronychia–Melicope group, which originated during the Late and Middle Miocene (8.5–16.9 Ma).
