= Melicope saint-johnii =

Conservation status
- Endangered (IUCN 2.3)

Scientific classification
- Kingdom: Plantae
- Clade: Tracheophytes
- Clade: Angiosperms
- Clade: Eudicots
- Clade: Rosids
- Order: Sapindales
- Family: Rutaceae
- Genus: Melicope
- Species: M. saint-johnii

Binomial name
- Melicope saint-johnii (Hume) T.G.Hartley & B.C.Stone

Species of tree

Melicope saint-johnii, the St. John's pelea or St. John's melicope, is a species of tree in the family Rutaceae. It is endemic to the Hawaiian Islands, where it is present only on the island of Oahu. Like other Hawaiian Melicope, this species is known as alani. It is threatened by habitat loss. It is a federally listed endangered species of the United States.

This tree grows up to 6 meters tall. It grows in moist forest habitat in the Waianae Range of Oahu, where there are probably fewer than 150 individuals remaining. It is threatened by the degradation of its habitat by non-native plant species and feral pigs.
