= Melicope contermina =

Scientific classification
- Kingdom: Plantae
- Clade: Tracheophytes
- Clade: Angiosperms
- Clade: Eudicots
- Clade: Rosids
- Order: Sapindales
- Family: Rutaceae
- Genus: Melicope
- Species: M. contermina

Binomial name
- Melicope contermina C.Moore & F.Muell.

Synonyms
- Euodia contermina (C.Moore & F.Muell.) (C.Moore & F.Muell.)

Species of shrub

Melicope contermina is a species of shrub or small tree in the family Rutaceae and is endemic to Lord Howe Island. It has trifoliate leaves and white flowers borne in leaf axils in panicles of nine to fifteen flowers.

== Description ==
Melicope contermina is a shrub or tree that typically grows to a height of 5–6 m (16–20 ft). It has trifoliate leaves arranged in opposite pairs and 70–210 mm (2.8–8.3 in) long on a petiole 15–80 mm (0.59–3.15 in) long, the leaflets elliptical, 40–90 mm (1.6–3.5 in) long and 20–35 mm (0.79–1.38 in) wide with many oil dots. The end leaflet is on a petiolule 5–18 mm (0.20–0.71 in) long and the side leaflets are asymmetrical and sessile or on a petiolule up to 7 mm (0.28 in) long. The flowers are arranged in groups of nine to fifteen in panicles 50–100 mm (2.0–3.9 in) long. The flowers on each plant are bisexual, sometimes male-only, female only, or both male-only and female-only. The sepals are broadly egg-shaped to round, 1–2 mm (0.039–0.079 in) long and fused at the base. The petals are white or creamy white, 1.5–2.5 mm (0.059–0.098 in) long and there are eight stamens. Flowering occurs from late October to late December and the fruit consists of up to four follicles 12–18 mm (0.47–0.71 in) long and fused at the base, the seeds shiny black and 5–6 mm (0.20–0.24 in) long.

== Taxonomy ==
Melaleuca contermina was first formally described in 1871 by Charles Moore and Ferdinand von Mueller in Fragmenta phytographiae Australiae from specimens collected near the base of Mount Gower on Lord Howe Island. The specific epithet comes from the Latin con (“with”) and terminus (“end”), with reference to the styles being joined at their ends.

== Distribution and habitat ==
This species is endemic to Lord Howe Island where it grows in forest and on open ridges. It is somewhat rare, but is most often seen in Erskine Valley, between Mount Lidgbird and Mount Gower, at the southern end of the island.
