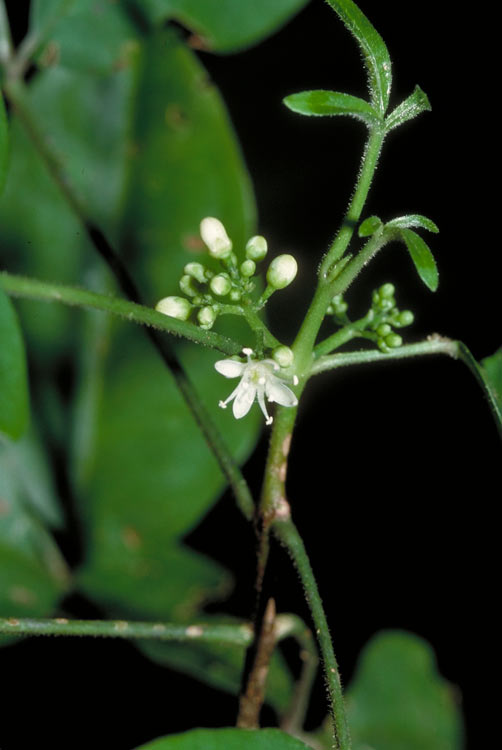

Scientific classification
- Kingdom: Plantae
- Clade: Tracheophytes
- Clade: Angiosperms
- Clade: Eudicots
- Clade: Rosids
- Order: Sapindales
- Family: Rutaceae
- Genus: Melicope
- Species: M. broadbentiana

Binomial name
- Melicope broadbentiana F.M.Bailey

Synonyms
- Melicope dielsii Lauterb.; Melicope glabriflora C.T.White & W.D.Francis; Melicope simplicifolia Domin

= Melicope broadbentiana =

False euodia

Species of shrub

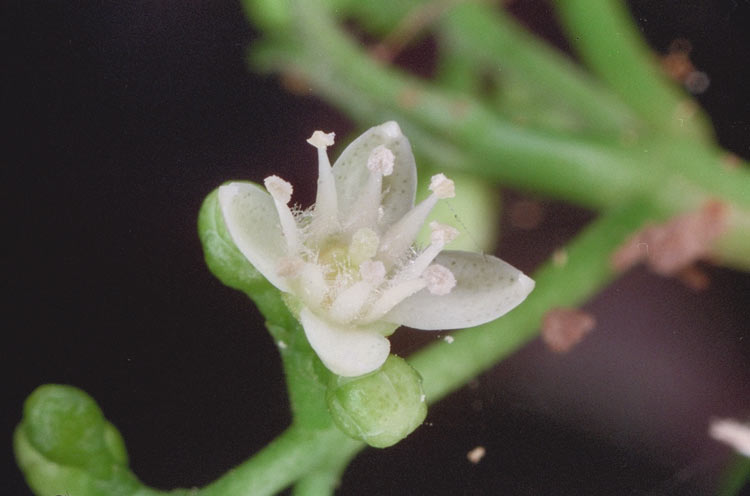
Flower detail

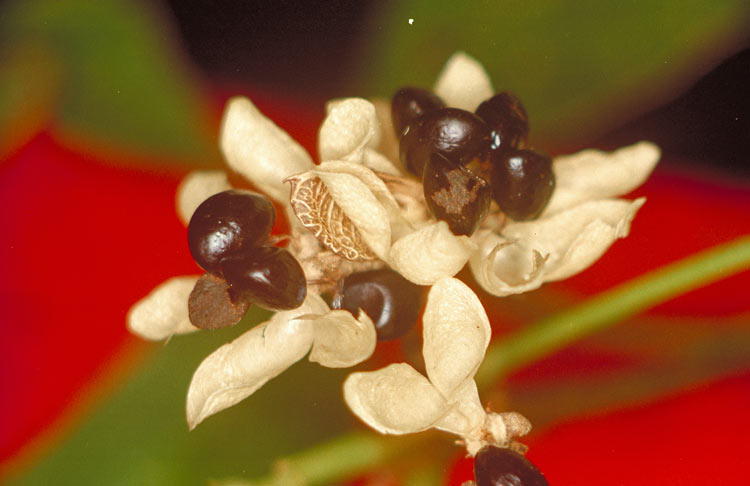
Fruit

Melicope broadbentiana, commonly known as false euodia, is a species of shrub or tree in the family Rutaceae and is endemic to Queensland. It has simple leaves, trifoliate leaves or both, and small white flowers borne in short panicles in leaf axils.

== Description ==
Melicope broadbentiana is a tree that may grow to a height of 20 m (66 ft) but will flower and fruit as a shrub. The leaves are simple and/or trifoliate and arranged in opposite pairs. The simple leaves are egg-shaped to elliptical, 40–100 mm (1.6–3.9 in) long and 15–40 mm (0.59–1.57 in) wide on a petiole 10–30 mm (0.39–1.18 in) long. The end leaflet of trifoliate leaves is elliptical, 45–160 mm (1.8–6.3 in) long and 15–55 mm (0.59–2.17 in) wide on a petiole 20–90 mm (0.79–3.54 in) long. The flowers are arranged in panicles 13–60 mm (0.51–2.36 in) long in leaf axils. The flowers are bisexual, male-only, female only, or both male-only and female-only. The sepals are egg-shaped to round, 1–1.3 mm (0.039–0.051 in) long and fused at the base. The petals are white, 2.5–3.5 mm (0.098–0.138 in) long and the four stamens, when present, alternate with four shorter staminodes. Flowering occurs in most months and the fruit consists of up to four follicles 9–12 mm (0.35–0.47 in) long and fused at the base.

== Taxonomy ==
Melicope broadbentiana was first formally described in 1891 by Frederick Manson Bailey in the Botany Journal of the Department of Agriculture, Queensland from specimens collected at an altitude of 4,000 ft (1,200 m) on Mount Bellenden Ker.

== Distribution and habitat ==
False euodia grows in rainforest from sea level to an altitude of 1,500 m (4,900 ft) and is found between the Mount Spurgeon National Park and the Paluma Range National Park in north Queensland.

== Conservation status ==
This species is classified as least concern in the Queensland Government's WildNet database.
