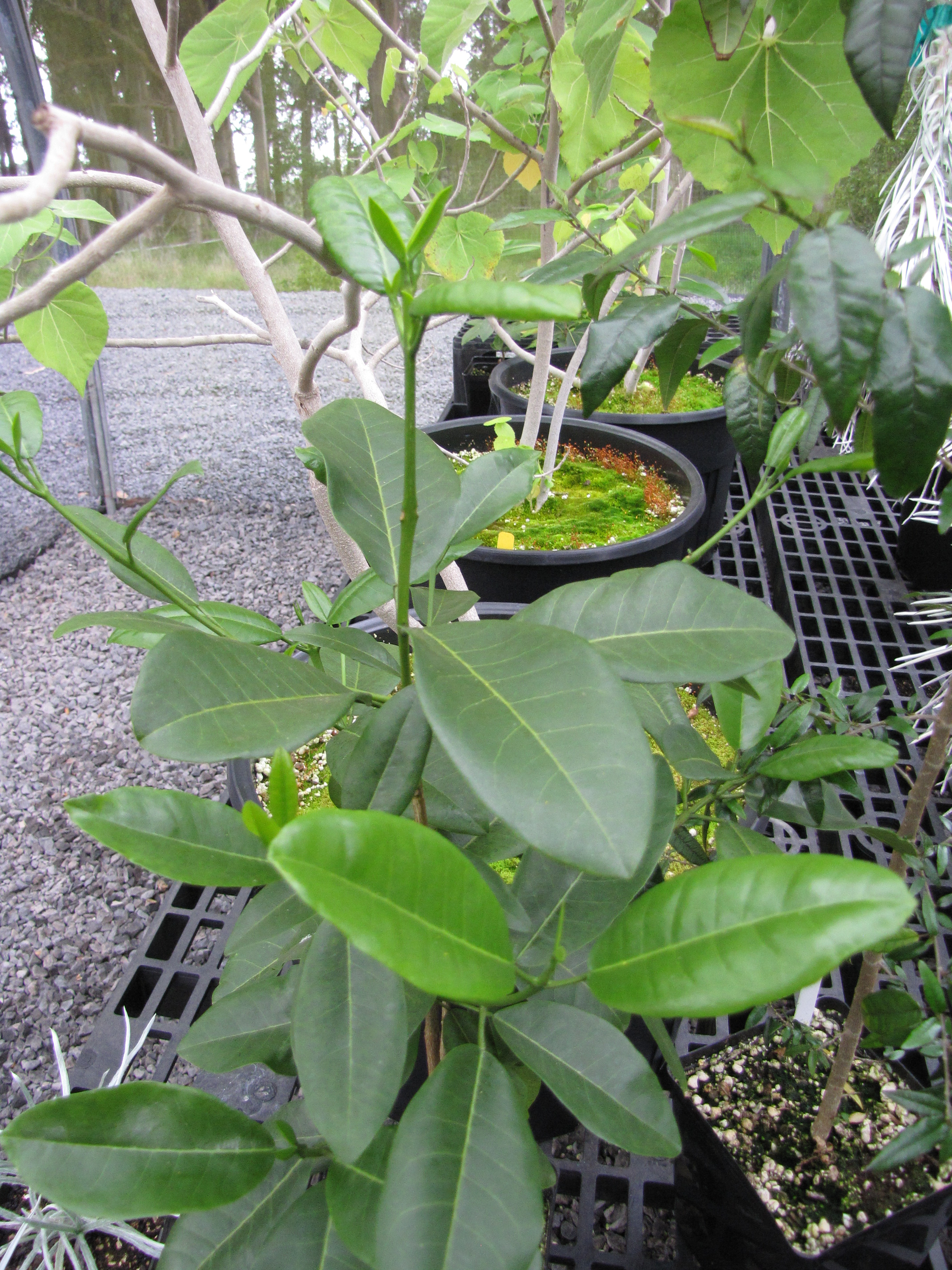

Conservation status
- Vulnerable (IUCN 2.3)

Scientific classification
- Kingdom: Plantae
- Clade: Tracheophytes
- Clade: Angiosperms
- Clade: Eudicots
- Clade: Rosids
- Order: Sapindales
- Family: Rutaceae
- Genus: Melicope
- Species: M. hawaiensis

Binomial name
- Melicope hawaiensis (Wawra) T.G.Hartley & B.C.Stone

Synonyms
- Pelea hawaiensis Wawra; Pelea brighamii H.St.John; Pelea cinerea var. racemiflora Rock; Pelea cinerea var. sulfurea Rock; Pelea gaudichaudii H.St.John; Pelea kilaueaensis H.St.John; Pelea sulfurea (Rock) H.St.John & E.P.Hume

= Melicope hawaiensis =

Species of flowering plant

Melicope hawaiensis, or manena, is a species of flowering plant in the family Rutaceae, that is endemic to the Hawaiian Islands. It is threatened by habitat loss.
