= Melicope glabra =

Conservation status
- Least Concern (IUCN 3.1)

Scientific classification
- Kingdom: Plantae
- Clade: Tracheophytes
- Clade: Angiosperms
- Clade: Eudicots
- Clade: Rosids
- Order: Sapindales
- Family: Rutaceae
- Genus: Melicope
- Species: M. glabra

Binomial name
- Melicope glabra (Blume) T.G.Hartley

Synonyms
- Ampacus glabra (Blume) Kuntze; Euodia glabra (Blume) Blume; Fagara glabra Blume; Euodia kingii Engl.; Euodia krukovii Merr.

Species of tree

Melicope glabra is a tree in the family Rutaceae. The specific epithet glabra is from the Latin meaning 'hairless'.

== Description ==
Melicope glabra grows up to 40 metres (130 ft) tall. The fruits are round to elliptic and measure up to 0.4 cm (0.2 in) long. Its leaves have 3 leaflets each, obovate 10-16 centimeters long.

Its flowers have each 4-5 stamens in large panicles.

== Distribution and habitat ==
Melicope glabra grows naturally in Sumatra, Peninsular Malaysia, Singapore, Java and Borneo. Its habitat is primary forest from sea-level to 500 metres (1,600 ft) altitude, sometimes to 1,900 metres (6,200 ft).
