= Melicope madagascariensis =

Scientific classification
- Kingdom: Plantae
- Clade: Tracheophytes
- Clade: Angiosperms
- Clade: Eudicots
- Clade: Rosids
- Order: Sapindales
- Family: Rutaceae
- Genus: Melicope
- Species: M. madagascariensis

Binomial name
- Melicope madagascariensis (Baker) T.G.Hartley

Synonyms
- Ampacus celastracea (Baker) Kuntze; Ampacus madagascariensis (Baker) Kuntze; Euodia bojeriana Baill. Euodia celastracea Baker; Euodia madagascariensis Baker

Species of plant

Melicope madagascariensis is a species of plant in the family Rutaceae. It is endemic to Madagascar and is used as a medical plant.

== Taxonomy ==
The species was firstly described as Euodia madagascariensis by Baker in 1882. Hartley in 2001 re-classified the species as M. madagascariensis, as part of his major revision of integrating all Euodia, Evodia and Melicope into Melicope, especially all Euodia in Madagascar and the Mascarene Islands.

== Description ==
It reaches heights of 10–20 metres (33–66 ft), flowers from November to January and fruits around March to June. Its pollen is of sub-spheroidal shape, with an average polar length of 18 μm, a tricolporate aperture with a foveolate–reticulate sculpture.

== Medicinal usage ==
Locally, it is used as an exhilarating agent and as laxatives, and in formulations for the treatment of liver, kidney and stomach disorders, bronchitis and mumps. Ethanol extraction studies identified furoquinoline alkaloids and methoxyflavones from its stem barks, including compounds such as heliparvifoline with weak anti-malarial property, and skimmianine with moderate cytotoxicity to colon cancer cell lines. Its essential oil was extracted from its fruit through hydro-distillation, with main constituents identified include ocimene, methyl chavicol, and cadinene, with the oil showcased inhibitory activity to common bacterial and fungal pathogens.

== Phylogeny ==
M. madagascariensis, along with other Melicope species in Madagascar and the Mascarene Islands, came from the Lepta clade in the Acronychia–Melicope group, originated from 6.2–14.1 Ma, with the Madagascar–Mascarene group appeared around 1.7–4.4 Ma.
