= Melicope indica =

Conservation status
- Endangered (IUCN 2.3)

Scientific classification
- Kingdom: Plantae
- Clade: Tracheophytes
- Clade: Angiosperms
- Clade: Eudicots
- Clade: Rosids
- Order: Sapindales
- Family: Rutaceae
- Genus: Melicope
- Species: M. indica

Binomial name
- Melicope indica Wight

Species of flowering plant

Melicope indica is a species of plant in the family Rutaceae. It is endemic to India.
