= Melicope sandwicensis =

Conservation status
- Endangered (IUCN 2.3)

Scientific classification
- Kingdom: Plantae
- Clade: Tracheophytes
- Clade: Angiosperms
- Clade: Eudicots
- Clade: Rosids
- Order: Sapindales
- Family: Rutaceae
- Genus: Melicope
- Species: M. sandwicensis

Binomial name
- Melicope sandwicensis (Hook. & Arn.) T.G.Hartley & B.C.Stone

Species of flowering plant

Melicope sandwicensis, the Mt. Kaala melicope, is a species of plant in the family Rutaceae.

It is endemic to Oahu island, of the Hawaiian Islands.

It is an Endangered species, threatened by habitat loss.
