= Melicope christophersenii =

Conservation status
- Endangered (IUCN 2.3)

Scientific classification
- Kingdom: Plantae
- Clade: Tracheophytes
- Clade: Angiosperms
- Clade: Eudicots
- Clade: Rosids
- Order: Sapindales
- Family: Rutaceae
- Genus: Melicope
- Species: M. christophersenii

Binomial name
- Melicope christophersenii (St. John) T.G. Hartley & B.C. Stone

Species of flowering plant

Melicope christophersenii is a species of plant in the family Rutaceae known by the common name Waianae Range melicope. It is endemic to the Hawaiian Islands. It is threatened by habitat loss. It was named in honour of Erling Christophersen.
