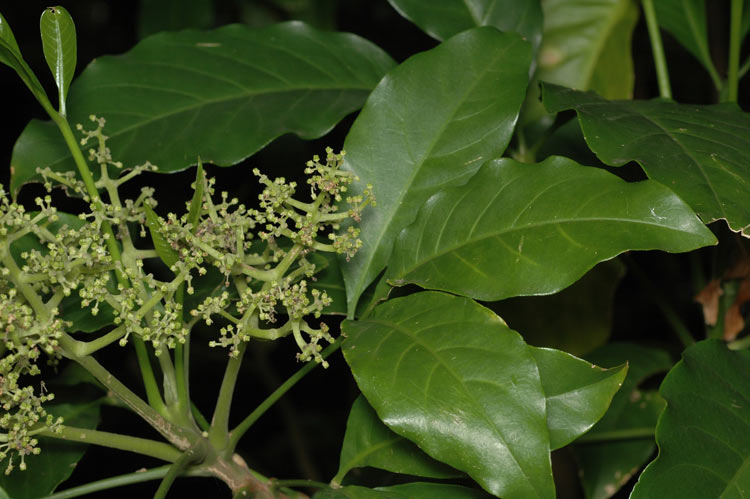
- Melicope vitiflora

Scientific classification
- Kingdom: Plantae
- Clade: Tracheophytes
- Clade: Angiosperms
- Clade: Eudicots
- Clade: Rosids
- Order: Sapindales
- Family: Rutaceae
- Genus: Melicope
- Species: M. vitiflora

Binomial name
- Melicope vitiflora (F.Muell.) T.G.Hartley

Synonyms
- Ampacus micrococca Kuntze orth. var.; Ampacus micrococcus (F.Muell.) Kuntze nom. illeg.; Euodia micrococca F.Muell.; Euodia micrococca F.Muell. var. micrococca; Euodia micrococca var. pubescens L.R.Fraser & Vickery; Evodia micrococca Domin; Evodia micrococca var. pubescens L.R.Fraser & Vickery orth. var.

= Melicope vitiflora =

Northern evodia

Species of tree

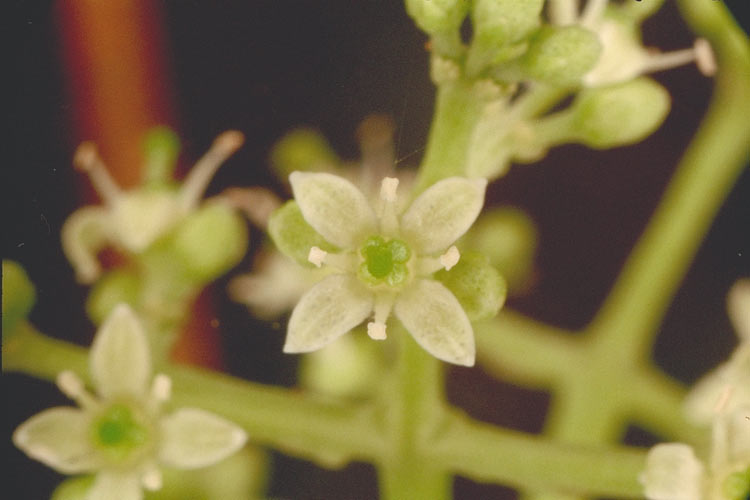
Flower detail

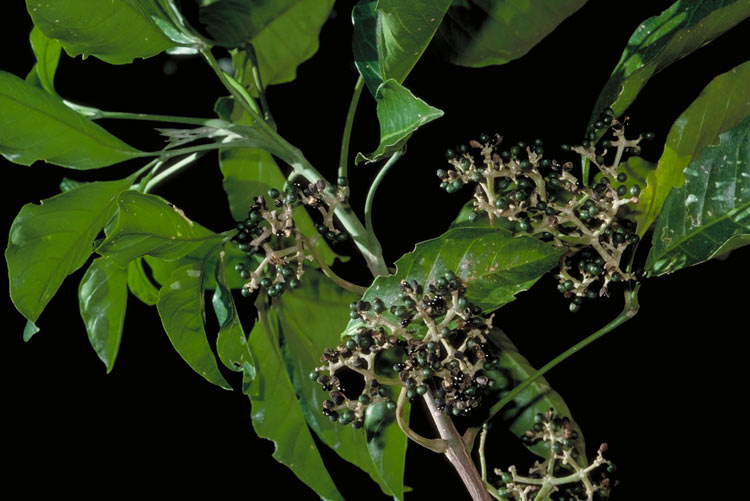
fruit

Melicope vitiflora, commonly known as northern evodia, fishpoison wood, leatherjacket or leatherwood, is a species of shrub or small tree in the family Rutaceae and is native to north-eastern Australia and New Guinea. It has trifoliate leaves and green to white or cream-coloured flowers borne in panicles in leaf axils.

== Description ==
Melicope vitiflora is a shrub or tree that typically grows to a height of 14–40 m (46–131 ft) with corky outer bark. The leaves are arranged in opposite pairs and trifoliate on a petiole 20–160 mm (0.79–6.30 in) long. The leaflets are egg-shaped to elliptical, 90–200 mm (3.5–7.9 in) long and 35–90 mm (1.4–3.5 in) wide on a petiolule 2–30 mm (0.079–1.181 in) long. The flowers are borne in panicles 60–200 mm (2.4–7.9 in) long in leaf axils. The flowers are bisexual, male or female, the plants with all male or all females flowers, or dioecious. The sepals are egg-shaped to triangular, 0.6–1 mm (0.024–0.039 in) long and joined at the base. The petals are green to white or cream-coloured and 1.5–3 mm (0.059–0.118 in) long. There are four stamens in the bisexual and male flowers. Flowering occurs from October to January and the fruit consists of up to four follicles 5–7 mm (0.20–0.28 in) long and joined at the base.

== Taxonomy ==
Northern evodia was first described in 1871 by Ferdinand von Mueller who gave it the name Euodia vitiflora and published the description in his book, Fragmenta phytographiae Australiae from a specimen collected near Rockingham Bay by John Dallachy. In 1990, Thomas Gordon Hartley changed the name to Melicope vitiflora in the journal Telopea.

== Distribution and habitat ==
Melicope vitiflora grows in coastal and inland rainforest and is found from near sea level to an altitude of 1,200 m (3,900 ft). It occurs in New Guinea and from the McIlwraith Range on Cape York Peninsula to Broken Head in far north-eastern New South Wales.

== Conservation status ==
This species is classified as of "least concern" under the Queensland Government Nature Conservation Act 1992.
