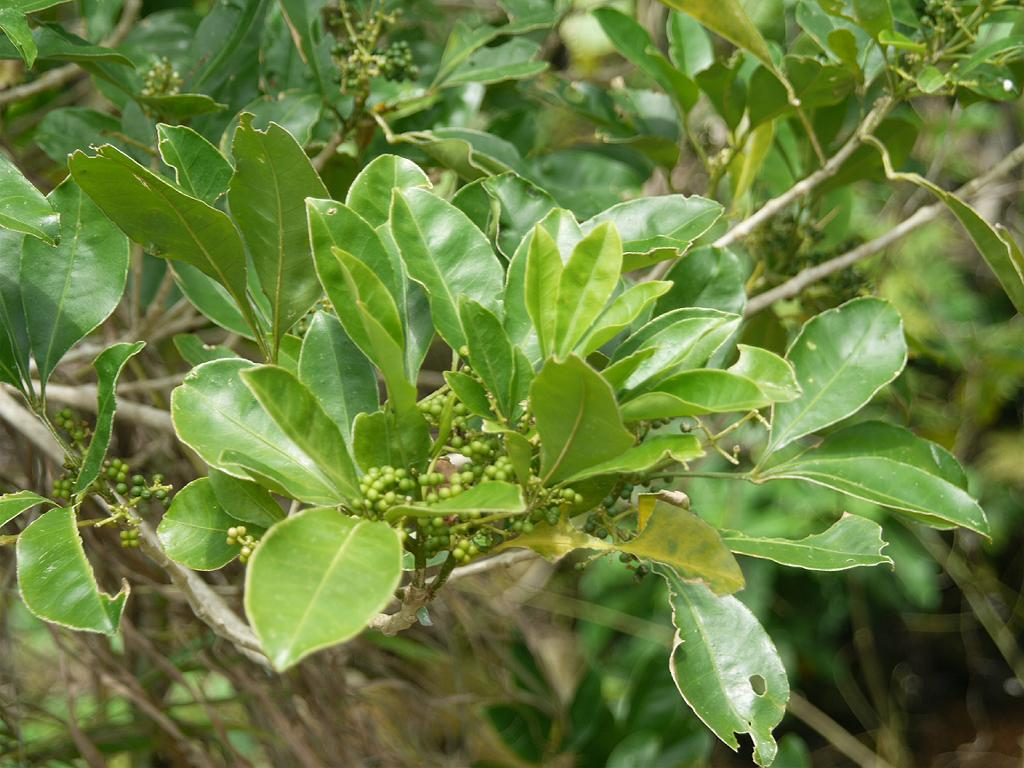

Scientific classification
- Kingdom: Plantae
- Clade: Tracheophytes
- Clade: Angiosperms
- Clade: Eudicots
- Clade: Rosids
- Order: Sapindales
- Family: Rutaceae
- Genus: Melicope
- Species: M. triphylla

Binomial name
- Melicope triphylla (Lam.) Merr.

Synonyms
- List: Acronychia minahassae (Teijsm. & Binn.) Miq.; Ampacus angustifolia Kuntze; Ampacus incerta (Blume) Kuntze; Ampacus triphylla (Lam.) Kuntze; Bergera ternata Blanco; Euodia anisodora Lauterb. & K.Schum.; Euodia awadan Hatus.; Euodia glaberrima Merr.; Euodia incerta Blume; Euodia laxireta Merr.; Euodia microsperma F.M.Bailey; Euodia minahassae Teijsm. & Binn.; Euodia philippinensis Merr. & L.M.Perry; Euodia triphylla (Lam.) DC.; Fagara triphylla Lam.; Lepta triphylla (Lam.) Lour.; Melicope awadan (Hatus.) Ohwi & Hatus.; Melicope curranii Merr.; Melicope densiflora Merr.; Melicope gjellerupii Lauterb.; Melicope kanehirae Hatus.; Melicope luzonensis Engl. ex Perkins; Melicope mahonyi F.M.Bailey; Melicope mindanaensis Elmer; Melicope monophylla Merr.; Melicope nitida Merr.; Melicope obtusa Merr.; Melicope odorata Elmer; Melicope rupestris Lauterb.; Zanthoxylum triphyllum (Lam.) G.Don

= Melicope triphylla =

Species of flowering plant

Melicope triphylla is a plant in the family Rutaceae. The specific epithet triphylla is from the Greek meaning 'three leaf', referring to the trifoliolate leaves.

== Description ==
Melicope triphylla grows up as a shrub or tree up to 15 metres (50 ft) tall. The flowers are unisexual. The ellipsoid to roundish fruits measure up to 0.5 cm (0.2 in) long.

== Distribution and habitat ==
Melicope triphylla grows naturally in the Ryukyu Islands and Taiwan south to Borneo and east to New Guinea. In Malaysian Borneo its habitat is forests from sea-level to 1,300 metres (4,300 ft) elevation.
