= Melicope tahitensis =

Conservation status
- Near Threatened (IUCN 2.3)

Scientific classification
- Kingdom: Plantae
- Clade: Tracheophytes
- Clade: Angiosperms
- Clade: Eudicots
- Clade: Rosids
- Order: Sapindales
- Family: Rutaceae
- Genus: Melicope
- Species: M. tahitensis

Binomial name
- Melicope tahitensis Nadeaud (1873)

Synonyms
- Euodia nadeaudii Drake (1892); Euodia nodulosa Drake (1890), pro syn.; Euodia sericea Drake (1886), pro syn.; Melicope diversifolia Guillaumin (1942)

Species of flowering plant

Melicope tahitensis is a species of plant in the family Rutaceae. It is endemic to the island of Tahiti in the Society Islands of French Polynesia.
