= Melicope waialealae =

Conservation status
- Endangered (IUCN 3.1)

Scientific classification
- Kingdom: Plantae
- Clade: Tracheophytes
- Clade: Angiosperms
- Clade: Eudicots
- Clade: Rosids
- Order: Sapindales
- Family: Rutaceae
- Genus: Melicope
- Species: M. waialealae

Binomial name
- Melicope waialealae (Wawra) T.G.Hartley & B.C.Stone

Synonyms
- Euodia waialealae (Wawra) Drake; Pelea waialealae Wawra; Pelea waianaiensis H.Lév.

Species of tree

Melicope waialealae is a species of flowering plant in the family Rutaceae. It is commonly known as Alani wai. It is endemic to the island of Kauai in Hawaii. M. waialealae is a perennial shrub or tree that grows up to 10 ft (3.0 m) tall. It is found in small, bog hammocks.
