= Melicope balloui =

Conservation status
- Critically endangered, possibly extinct (IUCN 3.1)

Scientific classification
- Kingdom: Plantae
- Clade: Tracheophytes
- Clade: Angiosperms
- Clade: Eudicots
- Clade: Rosids
- Order: Sapindales
- Family: Rutaceae
- Genus: Melicope
- Species: M. balloui

Binomial name
- Melicope balloui (Rock) T.G. Hartley & B.C. Stone

Species of flowering plant

Melicope balloui, also called Ballou's melicope or rock pelea, is a species of plant in the family Rutaceae. It is endemic to the Hawaiian Islands. It is threatened by habitat loss. Like other Hawaiian Melicope, this species is known as alani.

== Taxonomy ==
This plant was described in 1913 as Pelea balloui by Joseph Rock, who named it after Howard M. Ballou, the proofreader of his book on Hawaiian trees. It was later reclassified into the Melicope genus by Hartley and Stone in 1989.

== Description ==
It is a shrub or small tree growing up to 23 feet (7.0 m) tall, with leathery oval leaves up to 4.0 inches (10 cm) long by 2.8 inches (7.1 cm) wide, and thrives in wet tropical biomes. Young twigs are coated in yellow-brown hairs. The female inflorescence contains 5 to 9 flowers of yellowish green in color; the male flower has never been seen. The fruit is a capsule about 1.0 inch (2.5 cm) wide. Its new growth were characterized as having yellowish brown woolly hairs and waxy scales, with plant parts later become nearly hairless, grayish and sparser. The fruit is a four‐lobed capsule 1.0–1.1 inches (2.5–2.8 cm) wide, consisting of carpels 0.5 inches (1.3 cm) in length, and fused about a quarter of their length. One or two glossy black seeds around 0.3 inches (0.76 cm) long can be found in each fertile carpel. Flowering was observed from April to August.

As of 2013, this plant is only known from the northern and southeastern slopes of the volcano Haleakalā on Maui, with two known extant populations located approximately 2.5 miles (4.0 km) apart, one in Pu'uokāka'e and another in Kīpahulu, with the total amount of less than ten individuals. This species typically grows in montane wet forests at elevations between 760 and 1,520 m.
