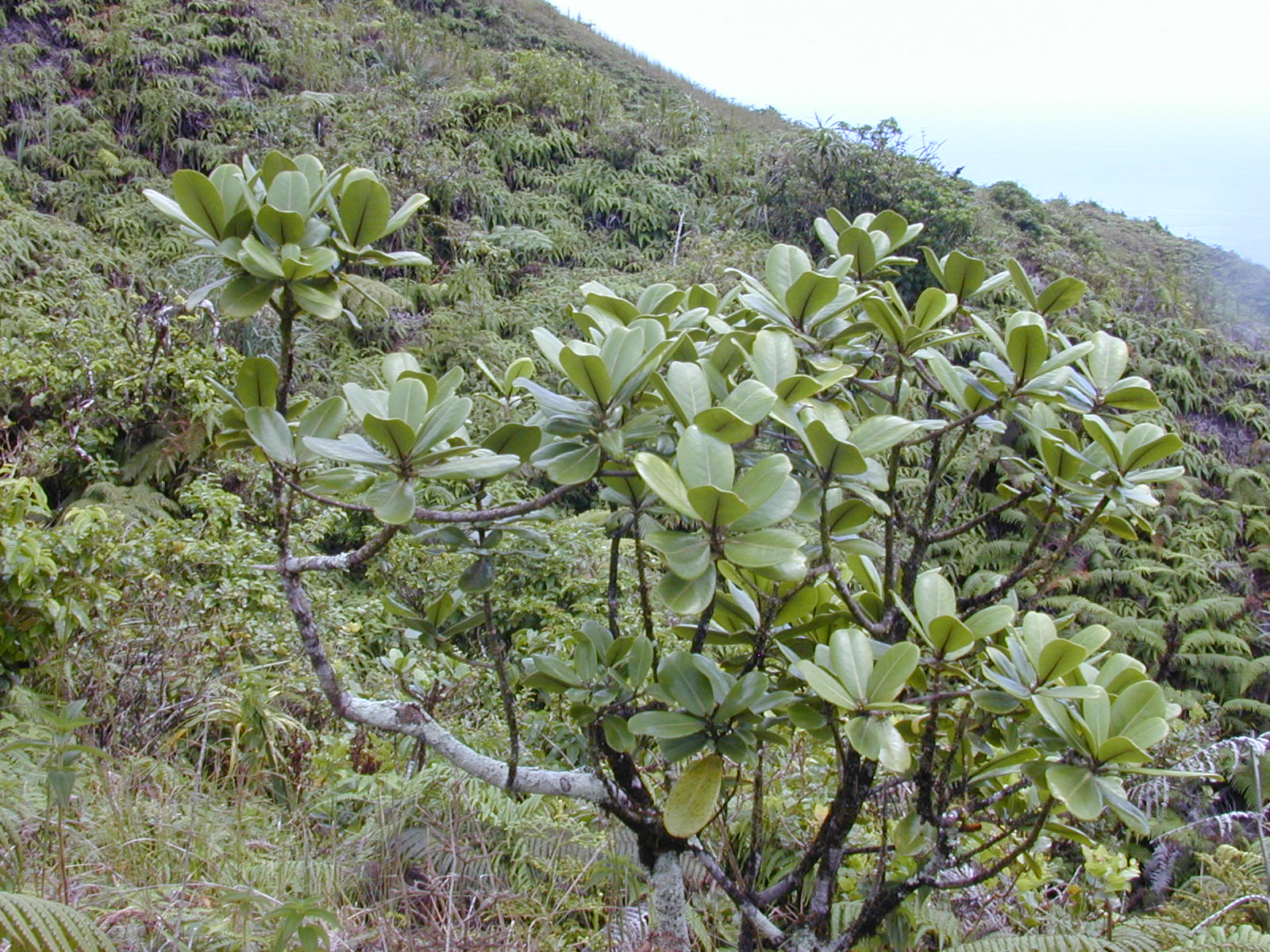
- Melicope clusiifolia

Scientific classification
- Kingdom: Plantae
- Clade: Embryophytes
- Clade: Tracheophytes
- Clade: Spermatophytes
- Clade: Angiosperms
- Clade: Eudicots
- Clade: Rosids
- Order: Sapindales
- Family: Rutaceae
- Subfamily: Zanthoxyloideae
- Genus: Melicope; J.R.Forst. & G.Forst

Species
- About 230, see text

Synonyms
- Astorganthus Endl.; Boninia Planch.; Entoganum Banks ex Gaertn.; Evodiella B.L.Linden; Lepta Lour.; Pelea A.Gray; Platydesma H.Mann; Tractocopevodia Raizada & K.Naray.

= Melicope =

Genus of plants

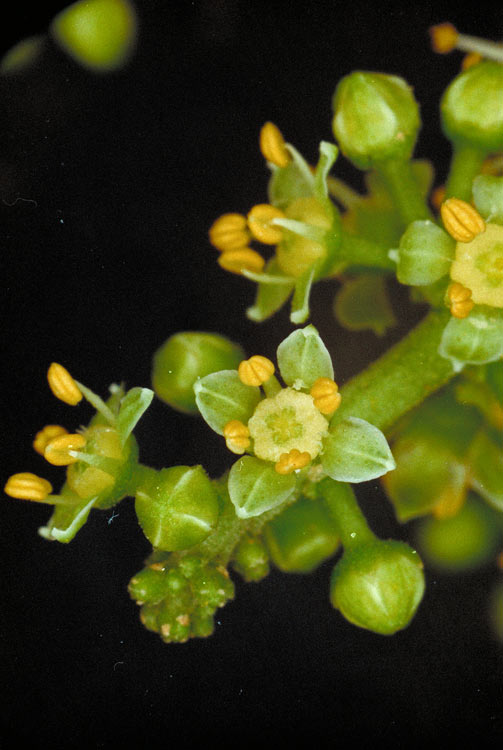
Flowers of Melicope xanthoxyloides

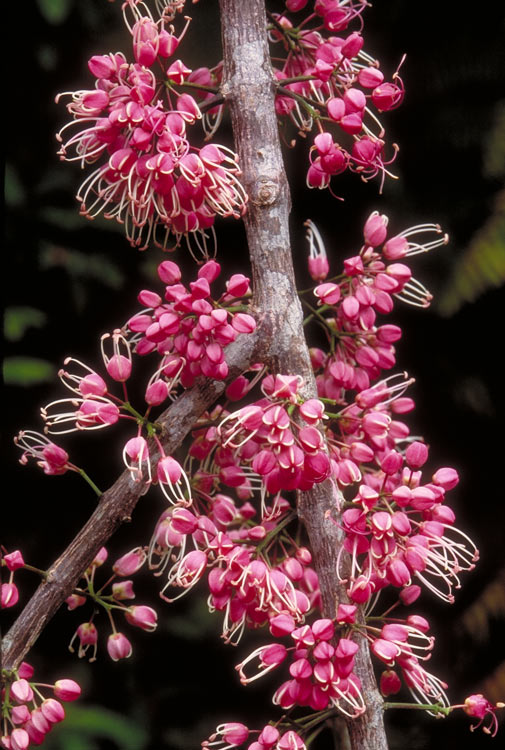
Flowers of Melicope rubra

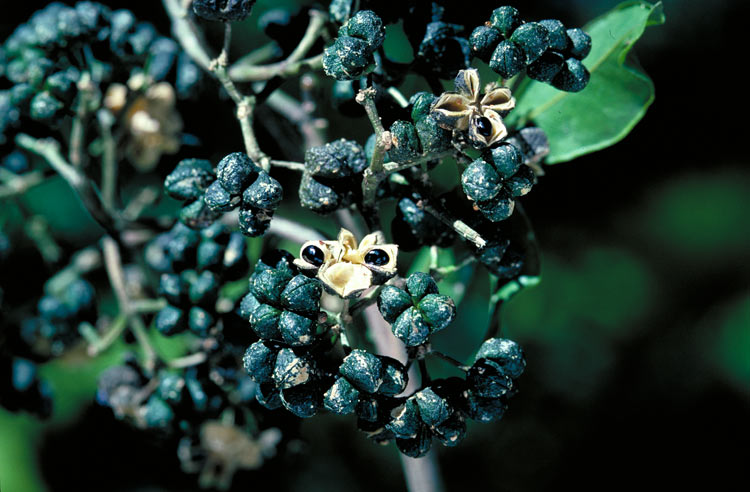
Fruit of Melicope jonesii

Melicope is a genus of about 240 species of shrubs and trees in the family Rutaceae, occurring from the Hawaiian Islands across the Pacific Ocean to tropical Asia, Australia and New Zealand. Plants in the genus Melicope have simple or trifoliate leaves arranged in opposite pairs, flowers arranged in panicles, with four sepals, four petals and four or eight stamens and fruit composed of up to four follicles.

== Description ==
Plants in the genus Melicope have simple or trifoliate leaves arranged in opposite pairs, or sometimes whorled. The flowers are arranged in panicles and are bisexual or sometimes with functionally male- or female-only flowers. The flowers have four sepals, four petals and four or eight stamens. There are four, sometimes five, carpels fused at the base with fused styles, the stigma similar to the tip of the style. The fruit is composed of up to four follicles fused at the base, each with one or two seeds.

== Taxonomy ==
The genus Melicope was first formally described in 1775 by Johann Reinhold Forster and his son Georg Forster in their book Characteres Generum Plantarum and the first species they described (the type species) was Melicope ternata.

The generic name Melicope is derived from Greek words μελι (meli), meaning "honey," and κοπη (kope), meaning "a division," referring to the glands at the base of the ovary. The 2009 Takhtajan system placed the genus in the subfamily Rutoideae, tribe Zanthoxyleae. A 2021 subfamily classification of the Rutaceae, based both on a new and previous molecular phylogenetic studies, places Melicope (with an expanded circumscription) in the subfamily Zanthoxyloideae, stating that the evidence does not yet support classification to tribal level.

Evidence from 2007 onwards showed that with its traditional circumscription, Melicope was not monophyletic. The previously separated genus Platydesma of four species is nested within the genus Melicope and is sister to all Hawaiian Melicope species. And while Melicope species are usually dioecious (individual plants only bear either male or female flowers), the flowers of the former Platydesma are hermaphroditic, suggesting a rare evolutionary reversion away from dioecy in Platydesma. Molecular phylogenetic analyses also suggest that the genera Comptonella, Dutaillyea, Picrella, and possibly Dutailliopsis, all from New Caledonia, might also be nested in Melicope, although they are accepted in the 2021 classification, as is the temperate Asian genus Tetradium, which has sometimes been merged into Melicope (possibly including the tropical Euodia).

== Ecology ==
Melicopes are foodplants for various animals, mainly invertebrates. Caterpillars of the Ulysses butterfly (Papilio ulysses) are fond of M. elleryana. Caterpillars of Thyrocopa moths have been found on M. clusiifolia. The larvae of some belid weevils from the genus Proterhinus also feed on Melicope although they prefer unhealthy, dying or dead specimens. The plants of some species may not be safe for humans. The nectar of wharangi (M. ternata) is known to yield toxic honey that may kill whoever eats it.

== Conservation ==
Several of the Hawaiian species are listed as "endangered" by the Government of the United States of America, due to habitat loss and competition from invasive non-native plants. A few species are already extinct.

=== Species list ===
The following is a list of species accepted by Plants of the World Online as of July 2020:

- Melicope aberrans T.G.Hartley – New Guinea (N.G.)
- Melicope accedens (Blume) T.G.Hartley – tropical Asia
- Melicope acuminata (Merr.) T.G.Hartley
- Melicope adscendens (H.St.John & Hume) T.G.Hartley & B.C.Stone - Hawaii
- Melicope aequata T.G.Hartley – N.G.
- Melicope affinis T.G.Hartley – Queensland (Qld.)
- Melicope alba Lauterb. – N.G.
- Melicope albiflora (Rech.) T.G.Hartley – Samoa
- Melicope alpestris T.G.Hartley – Philippines
- Melicope aneura (Lauterb.) T.G.Hartley – N.G.
- Melicope anisata (H.Mann) T.G.Hartley & B.C.Stone mokihana – Hawaii (?)
- Melicope anomala (Lauterb.) T.G.Hartley – N.G.
- Melicope bakeri T.G.Hartley – Madagascar
- Melicope balankazo (H.Perrier) T.G.Hartley
- Melicope balansae Guillaumin – New Caledonia (N.C.)
- Melicope balgooyi Appelhans, W.L.Wagner & K.R.Wood – Tubuai
- Melicope balloui (Rock) T.G.Hartley & B.C.Stone rock pelea – Hawaii
- Melicope barbigera A.Gray – Hawaii
- Melicope belahe (Baill.) T.G.Hartley
- Melicope benguetensis (Elmer) T.G.Hartley
- Melicope blancoi T.G.Hartley – Philippines
- Melicope bonwickii (F.Muell.) T.G.Hartley – Java, Borneo, the Philippines, N.G., Qld.
- Melicope borbonica (Bory) T.G.Hartley bois de catafaille blanc – Réunion
- Melicope boweriana (Christoph.) T.G.Hartley – Samoa
- Melicope bracteata (Nadeaud) S.L.Welsh – Cook Islands, Tubuai, Society Islands
- Melicope brassii T.G.Hartley – N.G.
- Melicope broadbentiana F.M.Bailey – Qld.
- Melicope buennemeijeri T.G.Hartley – Sumatra
- Melicope burmahia (Raizada & K.Naray.) T.G.Hartley – Myanmar
- Melicope burttiana B.C.Stone – Solomon Islands, Santa Cruz Island
- Melicope buwaldae T.G.Hartley – Sumatra
- Melicope calycina T.G.Hartley – Lesser Sunda Islands
- Melicope capillacea (Gillespie) A.C.Sm. – Fiji
- Melicope carrii T.G.Hartley – N.G.
- Melicope celebica T.G.Hartley – Sulawesi
- Melicope chapelieri (Baill.) T.G.Hartley – Mauritius
- Melicope christophersenii (H.St.John) T.G.Hartley & B.C.Stone – Hawaii
- Melicope chunii (Merr.) T.G.Hartley – Hainan
- Melicope cinerea A.Gray – Hawaii
- Melicope clemensiae T.G.Hartley – Borneo
- Melicope clusiifolia (A.Gray) T.G.Hartley & B.C.Stone – Hawaii
- Melicope conjuga T.G.Hartley – N.G. to Bismarck Archipelago
- Melicope contermina C.Moore & F.Muell. – Lord Howe Island
- Melicope coodeana T.G.Hartley – Réunion
- Melicope corneri T.G.Hartley – Peninsula Malaysia
- Melicope cornuta (Hillebr.) Appelhans, K.R.Wood & W.L.Wagner – Hawaii
- Melicope crassifolia (Merr.) T.G.Hartley – Vietnam
- Melicope crassiramis (K.Schum.) T.G.Hartley
- Melicope cravenii T.G.Hartley – N.G.
- Melicope crispula (Merr. & L.M.Perry) T.G.Hartley
- Melicope cruciata (A.Heller) T.G.Hartley & B.C.Stone cross-bearing pelea (extinct) – Hawaii
- Melicope cucullata (Gillespie) A.C.Sm. – Fiji
- Melicope degeneri (B.C.Stone) T.G.Hartley & B.C.Stone – Hawaii
- Melicope denhamii (Seem.) T.G.Hartley – N.G., Vanuatu, Santa Cruz Island
- Melicope dicksoniana T.G.Hartley – N.G.
- Melicope discolor (Baker) T.G.Hartley
- Melicope doormani-montis (Lauterb.) T.G.Hartley
- Melicope dubia (Merr.) T.G.Hartley
- Melicope durifolia (K.Schum.) T.G.Hartley – N.G.
- Melicope elleryana (F.Muell.) T.G.Hartley – N.G., Solomon Islands, Santa Cruz Island, Qld.
- Melicope elliptica A.Gray – Hawaii
- Melicope eriophylla (Merr. & L.M.Perry) T.G.Hartley
- Melicope erromangensis T.G.Hartley – Vanuatu
- Melicope euneura (Miq.) T.G.Hartley
- Melicope evanensis (A.C.Sm.) A.C.Sm. – Fiji
- Melicope exuta T.G.Hartley – N.G.
- Melicope fatraina (H.Perrier) T.G.Hartley
- Melicope fatuhivensis (F.Br.) T.G.Hartley & B.C.Stone – Marquesas Islands
- Melicope feddei (H.Lév.) T.G.Hartley & B.C.Stone – Hawaii
- Melicope fellii T.G.Hartley – Qld.
- Melicope flaviflora A.C.Sm. – Fiji
- Melicope floribunda (Baker) T.G.Hartley
- Melicope forbesii (Baker f.) T.G.Hartley – Santa Cruz Island
- Melicope frutescens (Blanco) Appelhans & J.Wen
- Melicope fulva (Guillaumin) B.C.Stone – N.C.
- Melicope glabella T.G.Hartley – Philippines
- Melicope glaberrima Guillaumin – N.C.
- Melicope glabra (Blume) T.G.Hartley – Malaysia, Andaman and Nicobar Islands
- Melicope glomerata (Craib) T.G.Hartley – Mainland Southeast Asia
- Melicope goilalensis T.G.Hartley – N.G.
- Melicope grisea (Planch.) T.G.Hartley – Bonin Islands to Volcano Islands
- Melicope haleakalae (B.C.Stone) T.G.Hartley & B.C.Stone Maui ruta tree (extinct) – Hawaii
- Melicope haupuensis (H.St.John) T.G.Hartley & B.C.Stone – Hawaii
- Melicope hawaiensis (Wawra) T.G.Hartley & B.C.Stone – Hawaii
- Melicope hayesii T.G.Hartley – Qld., New South Wales (N.S.W.)
- Melicope hiepkoi T.G.Hartley – N.G.
- Melicope hiiakae (B.C.Stone) T.G.Hartley & B.C.Stone – Hawaii
- Melicope hivaoaensis J.Florence – Marquesas
- Melicope homeophylla A.C.Sm. – Fiji
- Melicope hookeri T.G.Hartley
- Melicope hosakae (H.St.John) W.L.Wagner & R.K.Shannon – Hawaii
- Melicope idiocarpa T.G.Hartley – Sulawesi
- Melicope improvisa T.G.Hartley – N.G.
- Melicope incana T.G.Hartley – Sumatra, Borneo, Sulawesi
- Melicope indica Wight
- Melicope inopinata J.Florence – Marquesas
- Melicope irifica (Coode) T.G.Hartley – Réunion
- Melicope jonesii T.G.Hartley – Qld.
- Melicope jugosa T.G.Hartley – Borneo
- Melicope kaalaensis (H.St.John) T.G.Hartley & B.C.Stone – Hawaii
- Melicope kainantuensis T.G.Hartley – N.G.
- Melicope kavaiensis (H.Mann) T.G.Hartley & B.C.Stone – Hawaii
- Melicope kjellbergii T.G.Hartley – Sulawesi
- Melicope knudsenii (Hillebr.) T.G.Hartley & B.C.Stone Knudsen's melicope – Hawaii
- Melicope kostermansii T.G.Hartley – Maluku Islands to N.G.
- Melicope laevis T.G.Hartley – Vanuatu
- Melicope lamii Lauterb. – N.G.
- Melicope lasioneura (Baill.) Baill. ex Guillaumin
- Melicope latifolia (DC.) T.G.Hartley – Malaysia, Lesser Sunda Island, Myanmar, Samoa, Santa Cruz Island
- Melicope lauterbachii T.G.Hartley
- Melicope laxa (Elmer)T.G.Hartley
- Melicope leptococca Guillaumin – N.C.
- Melicope littoralis (Endl.) T.G.Hartley ex P.S.Green – Norfolk Island
- Melicope lobocarpa (F.Muell.) T.G.Hartley
- Melicope longior T.G.Hartley – Bismarck Archipelago
- Melicope lucida (A.Gray) A.C.Sm. – Pacific Islands
- Melicope lunu-ankenda (Gaertn.) T.G.Hartley – Tibet, tropical Asia
- Melicope lydgatei (Hillebr.) T.G.Hartley & B.C.Stone - Hawaii
- Melicope macgregorii T.G.Hartley – N.G.
- Melicope macrocarpa (King) T.G.Hartley – Malaysia
- Melicope macrophylla Merr. & L.M.Perry – N.G.
- Melicope macropus (Hillebr.) T.G.Hartley & B.C.Stone – Hawaii
- Melicope madagascariensis (Baker) T.G.Hartley – Madagascar
- Melicope magnifolia (Baill.) T.G.Hartley
- Melicope makahae (B.C.Stone) T.G.Hartley & B.C.Stone – Hawaii
- Melicope maliliensis T.G.Hartley – Sulawesi
- Melicope margaretae (F.Br.) T.G.Hartley – Tuamotus
- Melicope maxii T.G.Hartley – Sulawesi
- Melicope megastigma T.G.Hartley – Maluku Islands
- Melicope micrococca (F.Muell.) T.G.Hartley white euodia – Qld., N.S.W.
- Melicope mindorensis T.G.Hartley – Philippines
- Melicope molokaiensis (Hillebr.) T.G.Hartley & B.C.Stone – Hawaii
- Melicope moluccana T.G.Hartley – Maluku Islands
- Melicope montana Baker f. – N.C.
- Melicope monticola T.G.Hartley
- Melicope mucronata Merr. & L.M.Perry – N.G.
- Melicope mucronulata (H.St.John) T.G.Hartley & B.C.Stone – Hawaii
- Melicope munroi (H.St.John) T.G.Hartley & B.C.Stone – Hawaii
- Melicope nealae (B.C.Stone) T.G.Hartley & B.C.Stone – Hawaii
- Melicope neglecta T.G.Hartley – Java to Lesser Sunda Islands
- Melicope nishimurae (Koidz.) T.Yamaz. – Bonin Islands
- Melicope novoguineensis Valeton – N.G.
- Melicope nubicola T.G.Hartley – Solomon Islands
- Melicope nukuhivensis (F.Br.) T.G.Hartley & B.C.Stone – Marquesas
- Melicope oahuensis (H.Lév.) T.G.Hartley & B.C.Stone – Hawaii
- Melicope oblanceolata T.G.Hartley – N.G.
- Melicope obovata (H.St.John) T.G.Hartley & B.C.Stone obovate melicope (extinct) – Hawaii
- Melicope obscura (Cordem.) T.G.Hartley – Réunion
- Melicope obtusifolia (DC.) T.G.Hartley gros catafaille – Mauritius
- Melicope oppenheimeri K.R.Wood, Appelhans & W.L.Wagner
- Melicope orbicularis (Hillebr.) T.G.Hartley & B.C.Stone orbicular pelea – Hawaii
- Melicope ovalis (H.St.John) T.G.Hartley & B.C.Stone wild pelea – Hawaii
- Melicope ovata (H.St.John & E.P.Hume) T.G.Hartley & B.C.Stone – Hawaii
- Melicope pachyphylla (King) T.G.Hartley – Malaysia
- Melicope pachypoda (Lauterb.) T.G.Hartley
- Melicope pahangensis T.G.Hartley – Laos
- Melicope palawensis (Lauterb.) T.G.Hartley – Philippines
- Melicope pallida (Hillebr.) T.G.Hartley & B.C.Stone – Hawaii
- Melicope paniculata (H.St.John) T.G.Hartley & B.C.Stone Lihue ruta tree – Hawaii
- Melicope papuana (Lauterb.) Lauterb. – N.G.
- Melicope patulinervia (Merr. & Chun) C.C.Huang – Hainan
- Melicope pauciflora T.G.Hartley – Sulawesi
- Melicope pedicellata T.G.Hartley – N.C.
- Melicope peduncularis (H.Lév.) T.G.Hartley & B.C.Stone – Hawaii
- Melicope pendula T.G.Hartley – Solomon Islands
- Melicope peninsularis T.G.Hartley – Qld.
- Melicope pergamentacea (Elmer) T.G.Hartley
- Melicope perlmanii J.Florence – Marquesas
- Melicope perryae T.G.Hartley – N.G.
- Melicope petiolaris T.G.Hartley – N.G.
- Melicope phanerophlebia (Merr. & L.M.Perry) T.G.Hartley
- Melicope polydenia Merr. & L.M.Perry – N.G.
- Melicope polybotrya (C.Moore & F.Muell.) T.G.Hartley ex P.S.Green Lord Howe Island
- Melicope ponapensis Lauterb. – Caroline Islands
- Melicope pseudoanisata (Rock) T.G.Hartley & B.C.Stone – Hawaii
- Melicope pteleifolia (Champ. ex Benth.) T.G.Hartley – southern China to Indochina, Taiwan
- Melicope puberula (H.St.John) T.G.Hartley & B.C.Stone – Hawaii
- Melicope pubifolia Merr. & L.M.Perry – N.G.
- Melicope pulgarensis (Elmer) T.G.Hartley
- Melicope quadrangularis (H.St.John & E.P.Hume) T.G.Hartley & B.C.Stone four-angled pelea – Hawaii
- Melicope quadrilocularis (Hook. & Arn.) T.G.Hartley – Bonin Islands
- Melicope radiata (H.St.John) T.G.Hartley & B.C.Stone – Hawaii
- Melicope ramuliflora T.G.Hartley – Sumatra
- Melicope reflexa (H.St.John) T.G.Hartley & B.C.Stone – Hawaii
- Melicope remyi (Sherff) Appelhans, K.R.Wood & W.L.Wagner – Hawaii
- Melicope reticulata Lauterb. – N.G.
- Melicope retusa (A.Gray) T.G.Hartley – southwest Pacific
- Melicope revoluta J.Florence – Marquesas
- Melicope rhytidocarpa (Merr. & L.M.Perry) T.G.Hartley
- Melicope richii {A.Gray) T.G.Hartley – Samoa
- Melicope ridsdalei T.G.Hartley – N.G.
- Melicope rigoensis T.G.Hartley – N.G.
- Melicope robbinsii T.G.Hartley – N.G.
- Melicope robusta A.C.Sm. – Fiji
- Melicope rostrata (Hillebr.) Appelhans, K.R.Wood & W.L.Wagner – Hawaii
- Melicope rotundifolia (A.Gray) T.G.Hartley & B.C.Stone – Hawaii
- Melicope rubra (K.Schum. & Lauterb.) T.G.Hartley – N.G., Qld.
- Melicope saint-johnii (E.P.Hume) T.G.Hartley & B.C.Stone St John's pelea – Hawaii
- Melicope sambiranensis (H.Perrier) T.G.Hartley
- Melicope sandwicensis (Hook. & Arn.) T.G.Hartley & B.C.Stone – Hawaii
- Melicope savaiensis T.G.Hartley – Samoa
- Melicope schraderi (Lauterb.) T.G.Hartley
- Melicope seemannii (Gillespie) A.C.Sm. – Fiji, Tonga
- Melicope segregis (Cordem.) T.G.Hartley – Réunion
- Melicope semecarpifolia (Merr.) T.G.Hartley – Taiwan to Philippines
- Melicope sessilifolia (Merr.) T.G.Hartley
- Melicope sessilis (H.Lév.) T.G.Hartley & B.C.Stone – Hawaii
- Melicope simplex A.Cunn. poataniwha – New Zealand
- Melicope sororia T.G.Hartley – Borneo
- Melicope spathulata A.Gray – Hawaii
- Melicope steenisii T.G.Hartley – Sumatra
- Melicope stellulata T.G.Hartley – N.G.
- Melicope sterrophylla Merr. & L.M.Perry – N.G.
- Melicope stonei K.R.Wood, Appelhans & W.L.Wagner – Hawaii
- Melicope suberosa B.C.Stone – Peninsula Malaysia
- Melicope subunifoliolata (Stapf) T.G.Hartley
- Melicope sudestica T.G.Hartley – N.G.
- Melicope sulcata T.G.Hartley – Samoa
- Melicope tahitensis Nadeaud – Society Island, N.C.
- Melicope taveuniensis A.C.Sm. – Fiji
- Melicope tekaoensis T.G.Hartley – Marquesas
- Melicope ternata J.R.Forst. & G.Forst. wharangi – New Zealand
- Melicope timorensis T.G.Hartley – Lesser Sunda Islands
- Melicope trachycarpa Lauterb. – N.G.
- Melicope trichantha (Lauterb.) T.G.Hartley
- Melicope trichopetala (Lauterb.) T.G.Hartley
- Melicope triphylla (Lam.) Merr. – Indo-China to Ryukyu Islands and SW. Pacific
- Melicope tsaratananensis (Capuron) T.G.Hartley
- Melicope vatiana (Setch.) T.G.Hartley – Samoa
- Melicope versteeghii T.G.Hartley – N.G.
- Melicope vieillardii (Baill.) Guillaumin – N.C.
- Melicope villosa (Merr.) T.G.Hartley
- Melicope vinkii T.G.Hartley – N.G.
- Melicope viticina (Wall. ex Kurz) T.G.Hartley – Yunan to Indo-China
- Melicope vitiflora (F.Muell.) T.G.Hartley – N.G., Qld., N.S.W.
- Melicope volcanica (A.Gray) T.G.Hartley & B.C.Stone – Hawaii
- Melicope waialealae (Wawra) T.G.Hartley & B.C.Stone – Hawaii
- Melicope wailauensis (H.St.John) T.G.Hartley & B.C.Stone – Hawaii
- Melicope wawraeana (Rock) T.G.Hartley & B.C.Stone – Hawaii
- Melicope woitapensis T.G.Hartley – N.G.
- Melicope xanthoxyloides (F.Muell.) T.G.Hartley – Qld., N.G.
- Melicope zahlbruckneri (Rock) T.G.Hartley & B.C.Stone Zahlbruckner's melicope
- Melicope zambalensis (Elmer) T.G.Hartley
