= Melicope quadrangularis =

Conservation status
- Critically Endangered (IUCN 3.1)

Scientific classification
- Kingdom: Plantae
- Clade: Tracheophytes
- Clade: Angiosperms
- Clade: Eudicots
- Clade: Rosids
- Order: Sapindales
- Family: Rutaceae
- Genus: Melicope
- Species: M. quadrangularis

Binomial name
- Melicope quadrangularis (H.St.John & Hume) T.G.Hartley & B.C.Stone

Species of flowering plant

Melicope quadrangularis, also called four angle melicope or four-angled pelea, is a species of plant in the family Rutaceae. It is endemic to the Hawaiian Islands, where it is known only from the island of Kauai. It is threatened by habitat loss.

The type specimen of this species was collected in 1909. The plant was not seen again, and was presumed extinct, until 1991 when it was rediscovered. At that time there were 13 plants counted. This population had disappeared by 1998 and was likely destroyed in Hurricane Iniki. By 2010 no additional plants had been discovered, there are none growing in cultivation, and there are no seeds in storage. However, there may be specimens still alive in unsurveyed areas.
