= Melicope frutescens =

Scientific classification
- Kingdom: Plantae
- Clade: Embryophytes
- Clade: Tracheophytes
- Clade: Angiosperms
- Clade: Eudicots
- Clade: Rosids
- Order: Sapindales
- Family: Rutaceae
- Genus: Melicope
- Species: M. frutescens

Binomial name
- Melicope frutescens (Blanco) Appelhans & J.Wen

Synonyms
- Cissus frutescens Blanco; Euodia confusa Merr.; Melicope confusa (Merr.) Tang S.Liu

Species of tree

Melicope frutescens, synonym Melicope confusa, is a tree in the family Rutaceae.

== Description ==
Melicope frutescens grows up to 30 metres (100 ft) tall. The fruits are round to ellipsoid and measure up to 0.6 cm (0.2 in) long. The bark is used medicinally in Taiwan and the Philippines.

== Distribution and habitat ==
Melicope frutescens is native to Borneo, the Philippines, Sulawesi and the Maluku Islands. In Malaysian Borneo's Sabah state, its habitat is forests to 90 metres (300 ft) altitude.
