= Melicope fellii =

Scientific classification
- Kingdom: Plantae
- Clade: Tracheophytes
- Clade: Angiosperms
- Clade: Eudicots
- Clade: Rosids
- Order: Sapindales
- Family: Rutaceae
- Genus: Melicope
- Species: M. fellii

Binomial name
- Melicope fellii T.G.Hartley

Species of tree

Melicope fellii is a species of tree in the family Rutaceae and is endemic to Queensland. It has trifoliate leaves and pink flowers borne in short panicles in leaf axils.

== Description ==
Melicope fellii is a tree that typically grows to a height of 10–28 mm (0.39–1.10 in). The leaves are arranged in opposite pairs and trifoliate on a petiole 25–65 mm (0.98–2.56 in) long. The leaflets are egg-shaped to elliptical, 65–135 mm (2.6–5.3 in) long and 35–55 mm (1.4–2.2 in) wide. The flowers are arranged in panicles 20–35 mm (0.79–1.38 in) long in leaf axils. The flowers are bisexual, the sepals about 1.5 mm (0.059 in) long and fused at the base, the petals pink, about 3.5 mm (0.14 in) long and there are four stamens. Flowering has been recorded in July and the fruit consists of four follicles 8–10 mm (0.31–0.39 in) long and fused at the base.

== Taxonomy ==
Melicope fellii was first formally described in 2001 by Thomas Gordon Hartley in the journal Allertonia from specimens collected in 1997 by Paul Irwin Forster and others. The specific epithet (fellii) honours David G. Fell who collected specimens during a rainforest survey.

== Distribution and habitat ==
This melicope grows in rainforest at altitudes of 240–320 m (790–1,050 ft) on Cape York Peninsula where it is only known from two collections.

== Conservation status ==
This species is classified as of "least concern" under the Queensland Government Nature Conservation Act 1992.
