= Melicope revoluta =

Conservation status
- Least Concern (IUCN 2.3)

Scientific classification
- Kingdom: Plantae
- Clade: Tracheophytes
- Clade: Angiosperms
- Clade: Eudicots
- Clade: Rosids
- Order: Sapindales
- Family: Rutaceae
- Genus: Melicope
- Species: M. revoluta

Binomial name
- Melicope revoluta J.Florence (1990)

Species of flowering plant

Melicope revoluta is a species of plant in the family Rutaceae. It is endemic to the island of Nuku Hiva in the Marquesas Islands of French Polynesia.
