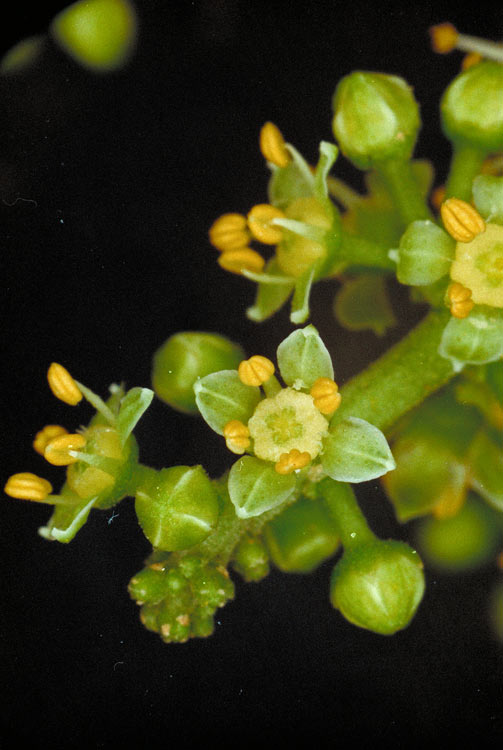
- Melicope xanthoxyloides male flowers
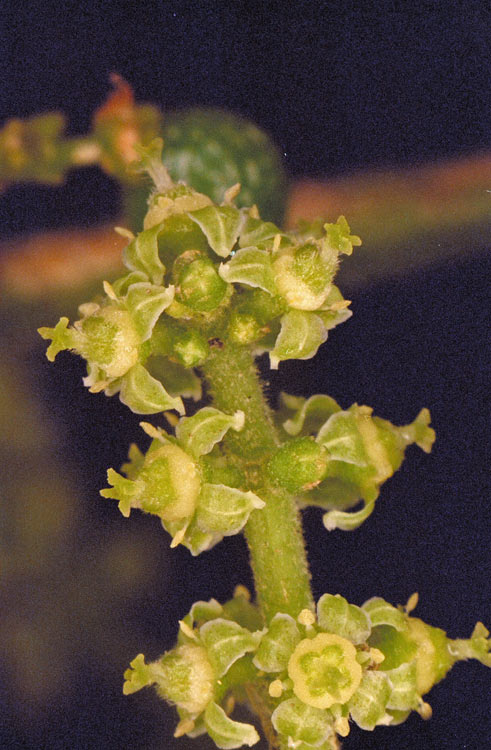
- Female flowers

Scientific classification
- Kingdom: Plantae
- Clade: Tracheophytes
- Clade: Angiosperms
- Clade: Eudicots
- Clade: Rosids
- Order: Sapindales
- Family: Rutaceae
- Genus: Melicope
- Species: M. xanthoxyloides

Binomial name
- Melicope xanthoxyloides (F.Muell.) T.G.Hartley

Synonyms
- Ampacus alata Kuntze orth. var.; Ampacus alatus (F.Muell.) Kuntze nom. illeg.; Ampacus xanthoxylodes Kuntze orth. var.; Ampacus xanthoxyloides (F.Muell.) Kuntze; Euodia alata F.Muell.; Euodia bakeriana Domin; Euodia xanthoxyloides F.Muell.; Evodia bakeriana Domin orth. var.

= Melicope xanthoxyloides =

Yellow evodia

Species of tree

Melicope xanthoxyloides is a species of small tree in the family Rutaceae and is native to New Guinea and Queensland. It has trifoliate leaves and small green to yellow or cream-coloured flowers arranged in panicles in leaf axils.

== Description ==
Melicope xanthoxyloides is a tree that typically grows to a height of 21 m (69 ft) and has a trunk usually no more than 30 cm (12 in) dbh. The leaves are arranged in opposite pairs and trifoliate on a petiole 35–140 mm (1.4–5.5 in) long. The leaflets are sessile or on a petiolule up to 3 mm (0.12 in) long and are elliptical to egg-shaped with the narrower end towards the base, 110–270 mm (4.3–10.6 in) long and 50–125 mm (2.0–4.9 in) wide. The flowers are arranged in panicles 50–140 mm (2.0–5.5 in) long in leaf axils and are male-only and female-only on separate plants. The sepals are egg-shaped to triangular, about 0.5 mm (0.020 in) long and fused at the base, the petals green to yellow or cream-coloured, 1.3–2 mm (0.051–0.079 in) long and there are four stamens. Flowering occurs from November to April and the fruit consists of up to four follicles 3–4 mm (0.12–0.16 in) long and fused at the base.

== Taxonomy ==
Melicope xanthoxyloides was first formally described in 1864 by Ferdinand von Mueller who gave it the name Euodia xanthoxyloides and published the description in Fragmenta phytographiae Australiae from specimens collected near Rockingham Bay by John Dallachy. In 2001, Thomas Gordon Hartley changed the name to Melicope xanthoxyloides in the journal Allertonia.

== Distribution and habitat ==
Yellow evodia grows in rainforest from near sea level to an altitude of 1,100 m (3,600 ft). It occurs in New Guinea including in the Bismarck Archipelago and from the McIlwraith Range on Cape York Peninsula to the Herbert River in northern Queensland.

== Conservation status ==
This species is classified as of "least concern" under the Queensland Government Nature Conservation Act 1992.
