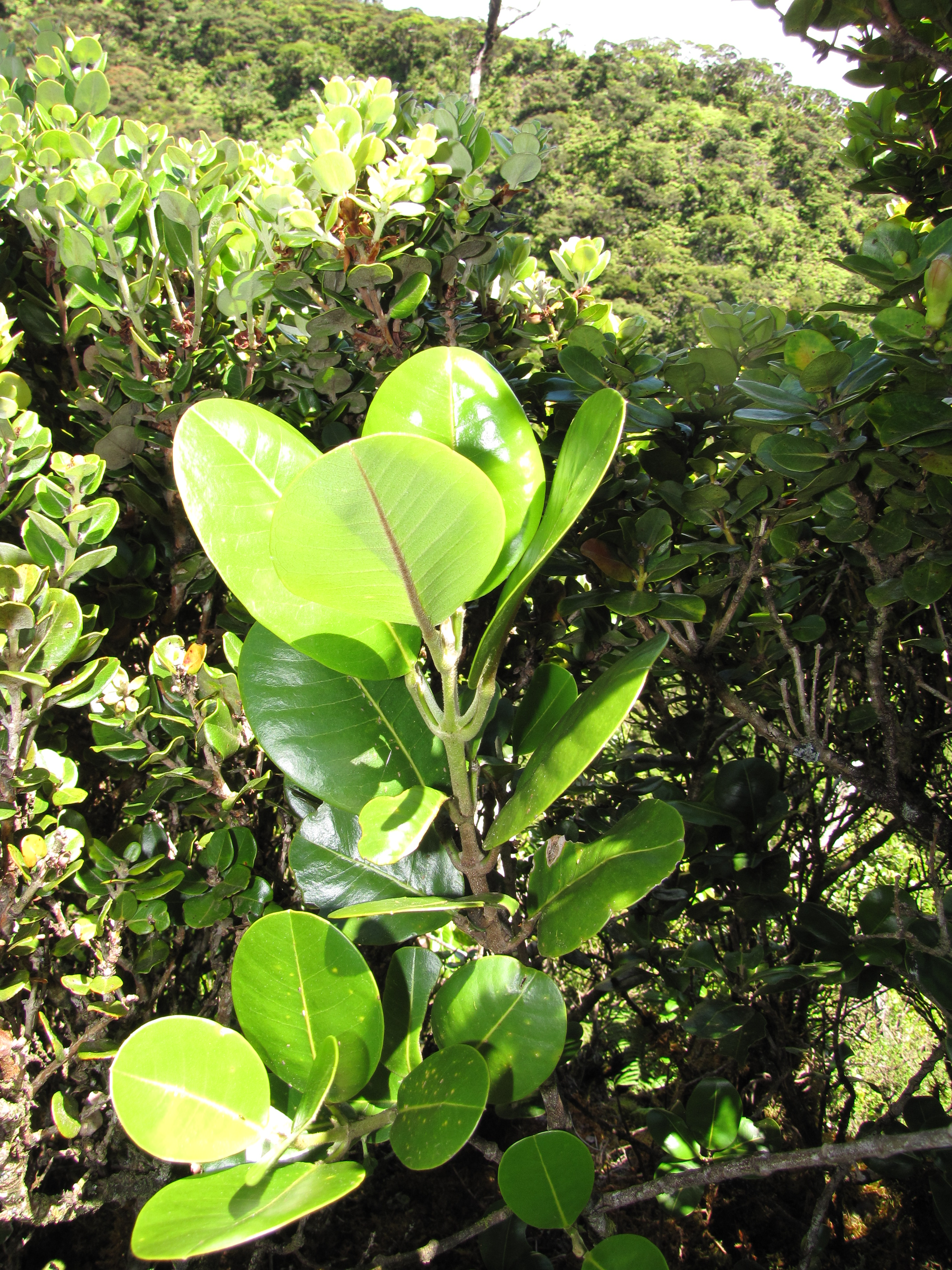

Conservation status
- Endangered (IUCN 2.3)

Scientific classification
- Kingdom: Plantae
- Clade: Tracheophytes
- Clade: Angiosperms
- Clade: Eudicots
- Clade: Rosids
- Order: Sapindales
- Family: Rutaceae
- Genus: Melicope
- Species: M. orbicularis

Binomial name
- Melicope orbicularis (Hillebr.) T.G.Hartley & B.C.Stone

= Melicope orbicularis =

Species of flowering plant

Melicope orbicularis, also called Honokahua melicope or orbicular pelea, is a species of plant in the family Rutaceae. It is endemic to the Hawaiian Islands. It is threatened by habitat loss.
