= Melicope zahlbruckneri =

Conservation status
- Critically Endangered (IUCN 2.3)

Scientific classification
- Kingdom: Plantae
- Clade: Tracheophytes
- Clade: Angiosperms
- Clade: Eudicots
- Clade: Rosids
- Order: Sapindales
- Family: Rutaceae
- Genus: Melicope
- Species: M. zahlbruckneri

Binomial name
- Melicope zahlbruckneri (Rock) T.G.Hartley & B.C.Stone

Species of tree

Melicope zahlbruckneri, with the common names Zahlbruckner's melicope, Zahlbruckner's pelea, and kipuka piaula, is a species of tree in the family Rutaceae.

It is endemic to the big island of Hawaii in the Hawaiian Islands, currently with one extant population within Hawaii Volcanoes National Park.

Like other Hawaiian Melicope, this species is known as alani.

Its habitat is lava flows and soils rich in volcanic ash. There is a single population of 25 mature trees in Hawaii Volcanoes National Park, and a few trees at a location nearby. A few immature trees have been planted in appropriate habitat. The plants are protected from cattle and feral pigs, but the habitat is still affected by non-native plants.

It is an IUCN Red List and U.S. federally listed endangered species, threatened by habitat loss.
