= Melicope remyi =

Conservation status
- Endangered (IUCN 2.3)

Scientific classification
- Kingdom: Plantae
- Clade: Tracheophytes
- Clade: Angiosperms
- Clade: Eudicots
- Clade: Rosids
- Order: Sapindales
- Family: Rutaceae
- Genus: Melicope
- Species: M. remyi

Binomial name
- Melicope remyi (Sherff) Appelhans, K.R.Wood & W.L.Wagner

Synonyms
- Platydesma remyi (Sherff) O.Deg., I.Deg., Sherff & Stone

Species of plant

Melicope remyi, synonym Platydesma remyi, the Hawaiʻi pilo kea, is a species of plant in the family Rutaceae. It is endemic to the island of Hawaii. It is threatened by habitat loss. It is on the IUCN Red List of Endangered species.
