= Melicope rostrata =

Conservation status
- Critically Imperiled (NatureServe)

Scientific classification
- Kingdom: Plantae
- Clade: Tracheophytes
- Clade: Angiosperms
- Clade: Eudicots
- Clade: Rosids
- Order: Sapindales
- Family: Rutaceae
- Genus: Melicope
- Species: M. rostrata

Binomial name
- Melicope rostrata (Hillebr.) Appelhans, K.R.Wood & W.L.Wagner

Synonyms
- Platydesma rostrata Hillebr. (also spelt P. rostratum)

Species of plant

Melicope rostrata, synonym Platydesma rostrata, is a rare species of flowering plant in the citrus family, known by the common name pilo kea lau li'i. It is endemic to Hawaii, where there are only about 100 individuals remaining on island of Kauai. It was federally listed as an endangered species of the United States in 2010.

This plant is a shrub growing one to three meters tall. The leaves are up to 42 centimeters long and white flowers occur in the leaf axils. The shrub grows in moist and wet forest habitat. It is threatened by feral pigs and other animals, and introduced species of plants.
