= Melicope hayesii =

Small-leaved doughwood

Scientific classification
- Kingdom: Plantae
- Clade: Tracheophytes
- Clade: Angiosperms
- Clade: Eudicots
- Clade: Rosids
- Order: Sapindales
- Family: Rutaceae
- Genus: Melicope
- Species: M. hayesii

Binomial name
- Melicope hayesii T.G.Hartley

Species of shrub

Melicope hayesii, commonly known as small-leaved doughwood, is a species of shrub or slender tree in the family Rutaceae and is endemic to eastern Australia. It has trifoliate leaves and small white flowers borne in panicles in leaf axils.

== Description ==
Melicope hayesii is a shrub or slender tree that typically grows to a height of 18 mm (0.71 in). It has trifoliate leaves arranged in opposite pairs on a petiole 15–60 mm (0.59–2.36 in) long. The leaflets are egg-shaped to elliptical, 32–95 mm (1.3–3.7 in) long and 12–40 mm (0.47–1.57 in) wide. The flowers are arranged in panicles 25–60 mm (0.98–2.36 in) long in leaf axils, the flowers bisexual with more or less round sepals about 1 mm (0.039 in) long and fused at the base. The petals are white, 3–3.5 mm (0.12–0.14 in) long and there are four stamens. Flowering occurs from October to January and the fruit consists of up to four follicles about 5 mm (0.20 in) long and fused at the base, containing shiny black seeds.

== Taxonomy ==
Melicope hayesii was first formally described in 1990 by Thomas Gordon Hartley in the Telopea from specimens collected near Purling Brook, Springbrook. The specific epithet (hayesii) honours Harold C. Hayes, a Forestry Commission botanist.

== Distribution and habitat ==
Small-leaved doughwood grows in, and near the edges of rainforest at altitudes of between 140 and 900 m (460 and 2,950 ft) and is found between the McPherson Range in south-east Queensland and the Hastings River in north-eastern New South Wales.
