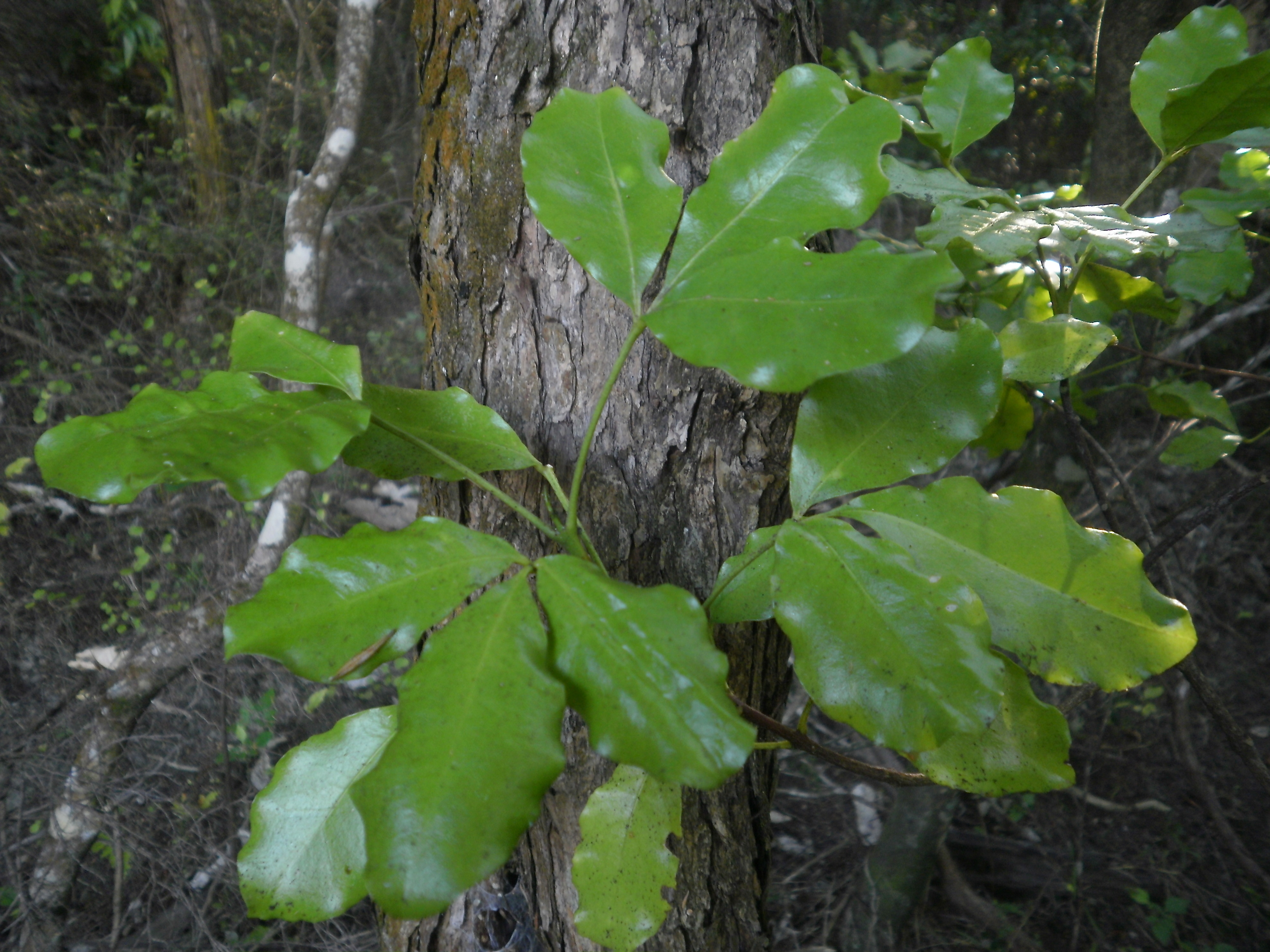

Scientific classification
- Kingdom: Plantae
- Clade: Tracheophytes
- Clade: Angiosperms
- Clade: Eudicots
- Clade: Rosids
- Order: Sapindales
- Family: Rutaceae
- Genus: Melicope
- Species: M. ternata

Binomial name
- Melicope ternata J.R.Forst. & G. Forst.

= Melicope ternata =

Species of tree

Melicope ternata, commonly known as wharangi, is a coastal shrub or small tree in the family Rutaceae that is native to New Zealand.

Melicope ternata has glossy, green, trifoliate foliage and can grow into a tree 6 metres tall. It is found in coastal areas in the main islands of New Zealand and the North, South, Three Kings and Kermadec islands.
