= Melicope paniculata =

Conservation status
- Critically Endangered (IUCN 3.1)

- Critically Imperiled (NatureServe)

Scientific classification
- Kingdom: Plantae
- Clade: Tracheophytes
- Clade: Angiosperms
- Clade: Eudicots
- Clade: Rosids
- Order: Sapindales
- Family: Rutaceae
- Genus: Melicope
- Species: M. paniculata

Binomial name
- Melicope paniculata (H.St.John) T.G.Hartley & B.C.Stone

Species of tree

Melicope paniculata, the Lihue melicope, is a rare species of tree in the family Rutaceae. It is endemic to the Hawaiian Islands. Like other Hawaiian Melicope, this species is known as alani.

== Description ==
It is a tree that can grow up to 11 meters or 35 feet tall. Covered in soft, downy hairs that are smooth. The young branches are in a reddish-brown color. The opposite, elliptic leaves are thin and leathery, and can be up to 25 centimeters or 10 inches long. The leaves color is glossy green on the top and paler green on the bottom. Male and female flowers are in a cymose panicles up to 25 centimeters or 10 inches long. The fruit has a anise-scent. The flowers can either be white or green in color. The flowers can bloom anytime in the year, under the correct circumstances.

== Distribution and habitat ==
This tree was until recently thought to be extinct. It was rediscovered in 1997. In 2010 there were an estimated 500 individuals remaining and it was added to the endangered species list of the United States. It has a global rank of G1, meaning critically imperiled, and has a local rank in Hawaii of S1, meaning the same thing. It has had a population decline of 10-30%. There is an estimated 100-250 individual plants.

The tree is endemic to the island of Kauaʻi, where it grows in wet forest habitat. It can also grow in bogs.
