= Melicope littoralis =

Shade tree

Conservation status
- Vulnerable (EPBC Act)

Scientific classification
- Kingdom: Plantae
- Clade: Tracheophytes
- Clade: Angiosperms
- Clade: Eudicots
- Clade: Rosids
- Order: Sapindales
- Family: Rutaceae
- Genus: Melicope
- Species: M. littoralis

Binomial name
- Melicope littoralis C.Moore & F.Muell.

Synonyms
- Euodia contermina (C.Moore & F.Muell.) (C.Moore & F.Muell.)

Species of shrub

Melicope littoralis , commonly known as shade tree, is a species of shrub or small tree in the family Rutaceae and is endemic to Norfolk Island. It has trifoliate leaves and small white flowers borne in leaf axils in panicles of a few to many flowers.

== Description ==
Melicope littoralis is a shrub or tree that typically grows to a height of 4–5 m (13–16 ft). It has mostly trifoliate leaves arranged in opposite pairs and 130–350 mm (5.1–13.8 in) long on a petiole 3–10 mm (0.12–0.39 in) long, the leaflets elliptical to egg-shaped, 100–240 mm (3.9–9.4 in) long and 60–130 mm (2.4–5.1 in) wide. The flowers are arranged in groups of a few to many, in panicles 20–160 mm (0.79–6.30 in) long and 15–60 mm (0.59–2.36 in) wide on a peduncle 10–80 mm (0.39–3.15 in) long. The flowers are borne on pedicels 1–2 mm (0.039–0.079 in) long, the sepals egg-shaped, 2–3 mm (0.079–0.118 in) long and joined at the base, the petals white, 4–5 mm (0.16–0.20 in) long and there are four stamens. The fruit consists of up to four follicles up to 12 mm (0.47 in) long and fused at the base, the seeds about 6 mm (0.24 in) long.

== Taxonomy ==
The shade tree was first formally described in 1833 by Stephan Endlicher who gave it the name Euodia littoralis and published the description in his book Prodromus Florae Norfolkicae. In 2001, Thomas Gordon Hartley changed the name to Melicope littoralis in the journal Allertonia.

== Distribution and habitat ==
This species is endemic to Norfolk Island where it grows in coastal and inland forest. It is most often seen in the Norfolk Island National Park.

== Conservation status ==
Melicope littoralis is listed as "vulnerable" under the Australian Government Environment Protection and Biodiversity Conservation Act 1999.
