= Melicope puberula =

Conservation status
- Endangered (IUCN 3.1)

Scientific classification
- Kingdom: Plantae
- Clade: Tracheophytes
- Clade: Angiosperms
- Clade: Eudicots
- Clade: Rosids
- Order: Sapindales
- Family: Rutaceae
- Genus: Melicope
- Species: M. puberula

Binomial name
- Melicope puberula (H.St.John) T.G.Hartley & B.C.Stone

Species of flowering plant

Melicope puberula, the hairy melicope, is a species of plant in the family Rutaceae. It is endemic to the Hawaiian Islands. Like other Hawaiian Melicope, this species is known as alani. In 2010 it was added to the endangered species list of the United States.

This shrub is endemic to the island of Kauai where it grows in wet forests and bogs. There are an estimated 900 individuals remaining.
