= Melicope kaalaensis =

Conservation status
- Vulnerable (IUCN 2.3)

Scientific classification
- Kingdom: Plantae
- Clade: Tracheophytes
- Clade: Angiosperms
- Clade: Eudicots
- Clade: Rosids
- Order: Sapindales
- Family: Rutaceae
- Genus: Melicope
- Species: M. kaalaensis

Binomial name
- Melicope kaalaensis (St. John) T.G.Hartley & B.C.Stone

Species of flowering plant

Melicope kaalaensis is a species of plant in the family Rutaceae known by the common name Kaala melicope.

It is endemic to the Waianae Range on Oahu island, in the Hawaiian Islands.

It is threatened by habitat loss.
