= Melicope subunifoliolata =

Conservation status
- Least Concern (IUCN 3.1)

Scientific classification
- Kingdom: Plantae
- Clade: Tracheophytes
- Clade: Angiosperms
- Clade: Eudicots
- Clade: Rosids
- Order: Sapindales
- Family: Rutaceae
- Genus: Melicope
- Species: M. subunifoliolata

Binomial name
- Melicope subunifoliolata (Stapf) T.G.Hartley

Synonyms
- Euodia subunifoliolata Stapf

Species of flowering plant

Melicope subunifoliolata is a plant of Borneo in the family Rutaceae. The specific epithet subunifoliolata is from the Latin meaning "nearly one leaf", referring to the almost unifoliolate leaves.

== Description ==
Melicope subunifoliolata grows up as a shrub or tree up to 15 metres (50 ft) tall. The branchlets are hairy to velvety when young. The inflorescences are hairy to velvety and measure up to 13 cm (5 in) long. The ellipsoid fruits measure up to 1 cm (0.4 in) long.

== Distribution and habitat ==
Melicope subunifoliolata is endemic to Borneo where it is confined to Sabah. Its habitat is mostly montane rain forests from 1,200 m (4,000 ft) to 2,600 m (8,500 ft) elevation, but sometimes in lowland rain forests as low as 180 m (600 ft). It is widely distributed in Sabah, including in Keningau, the Crocker Range, Ranau, Kota Marudu and Lahad Datu. It is especially common around Mount Kinabalu.
