= Melicope hookeri =

Conservation status
- Least Concern (IUCN 3.1)

Scientific classification
- Kingdom: Plantae
- Clade: Tracheophytes
- Clade: Angiosperms
- Clade: Eudicots
- Clade: Rosids
- Order: Sapindales
- Family: Rutaceae
- Genus: Melicope
- Species: M. hookeri

Binomial name
- Melicope hookeri T.G.Hartley

Synonyms
- Ampacus robusta (Hook.f.) Kuntze; Euodia robusta Hook.f.

Species of tree

Melicope hookeri is a tree in the family Rutaceae. It is native to Southeast Asia.

== Description ==
Melicope hookeri grows up to 36 m (120 ft) tall with a trunk diameter up to 90 cm (40 in). The almost leathery leaves are obovate or elliptic to ovate and measure up to 18 cm (7 in) long. The inflorescences are axillary and feature small unisexual flowers, occasionally bisexual, with white to greenish petals. The fruits are brown-green. The timber is harvested for local use.

== Taxonomy ==
Melicope hookeri was described in 1994 by the American botanist Thomas Gordon Hartley. The type specimen was collected in Penang. The species is named for the British botanist Joseph Dalton Hooker.

== Distribution and habitat ==
Melicope hookeri is native to Sumatra, Peninsular Malaysia, Singapore and Borneo. Its habitat is in primary and secondary forests, some dipterocarp, in hilly areas, generally at lower elevations. In Borneo the species may occur up to submontane elevations of 1,600 m (5,200 ft).

== Conservation ==
Melicope hookeri has been assessed as least concern on the IUCN Red List. It is considered critically endangered in Singapore.
