= Melicope cinerea =

Conservation status
- Endangered (IUCN 2.3)

Scientific classification
- Kingdom: Plantae
- Clade: Tracheophytes
- Clade: Angiosperms
- Clade: Eudicots
- Clade: Rosids
- Order: Sapindales
- Family: Rutaceae
- Genus: Melicope
- Species: M. cinerea

Binomial name
- Melicope cinerea Gray

Species of tree

Melicope cinerea is a species of plant in the family Rutaceae known by the common name manena. It is endemic to the Hawaiian Islands, specifically in Oahu. It is threatened by habitat loss.

== Taxonomy ==
M. cinerea was firstly identified by Gray in 1854, based on a sample in a ravine at the Kaala Mountains in Waiʻanae. Hartley and Stone in 1989 later re-classified Pelea cinerea from (A. Gray) Hillebr. (1888) into the Melicope equivalent.

== Description ==
M. cinerea grows in trees and shrubs up to 23.3 feet (7.1 m) tall, with new growth being densely dull, and grayish to yellowish brown puberulent, with its branchlets becoming glabrate over time. Leaf blades are elliptic or narrowly ovate, with maximum dimension of 6 inches (15 cm) in length and 2.8 inches (7.1 cm) wide. Petioles are 15–33 mm in length, and stipules are absent. The calyx consists of 4 ovate sepals measuring 2.5–3 mm long, characterised as densely grayish puberulent and imbricate. The corolla has 4 valvate, deltate petals 3.5–5 mm long, which are densely puberulent externally. 8 stamens are available in 2 distinct reduced whorls, but always present in functionally pistillate flowers. The ovary is superior, glabrous, and 4-celled and 4-lobed. Its fruit are dark green, measuring 20–30 mm wide, with distinct follicles 11–15 mm long. One or two seeds can be found per cell, characterised as glossy black when ripe, and ovoid-shaped, but sometimes angled due to compression. The original specimen by Gray was described as having glabrous branches with strong approximate leaf-scars, with opposite petioled leaves.

M. cinerea is endemic in Oahu, and thrives in mesic forests within the altitude of 790–2,690 feet (240–820 m).
