= Benjamin Clemens Stone =

20th-century British-American botanist

- Born: July 26, 1933; Shanghai China
- Died: March 19, 1994 (aged 60); Manila, Philippines
- Education: Pomona College; University of Hawaii
- Scientific career
- Author abbrev. (botany)

Benjamin Clemens Masterman Stone (July 26, 1933, Shanghai, China – March 19, 1994, Manila, Philippines) was a British–American botanist.

== Biography ==
Stone was born in Shanghai, China to a British father, who worked for the government, and an American mother. He graduated from Pomona College in Claremont, California and, in 1960, received a Ph.D. from the University of Hawaii.

Between 1961 and 1965, he was a faculty biologist at the University of Guam, where he started an herbarium, founded the journal Micronesica, and started collecting plant specimens which would form the basis of his book Flora of Guam.

He was a professor of botany at the University of Malaya in Kuala Lumpur from 1965 to 1984, during which time he helped to advance the KLU herbarium and the university's Rimba Ilmu Botanical Gardens.

Stone became the Botany Department Chair of the Philadelphia Academy of Natural Sciences and participated actively in its Flora of the Philippines Project. For this he spent time with the Bishop Museum in Honolulu and, later, the Botanical Research Institute of Texas (BRIT) in Fort Worth.

Stone travelled frequently to the Asian tropics and authored over 300 publications. He was especially noted for his skill in drawing botanical specimens. The pitcher plant Nepenthes benstonei was named in his honour. He died suddenly while working at the Philippine National Museum, aged 60.

== Publications ==
- The Flora of Namonuito and the Hall Islands (1959)
- The Genus Pelea A.Gray (Rutaceae; Evodiinae): A Taxonomic Monograph (1969)
- Flora of Guam: A Manual for the Identification of the Vascular Plants of the Island (1971)
- The Summit Flora of Gunung Ulu Kali (Pahang, Malaysia) (1981)
