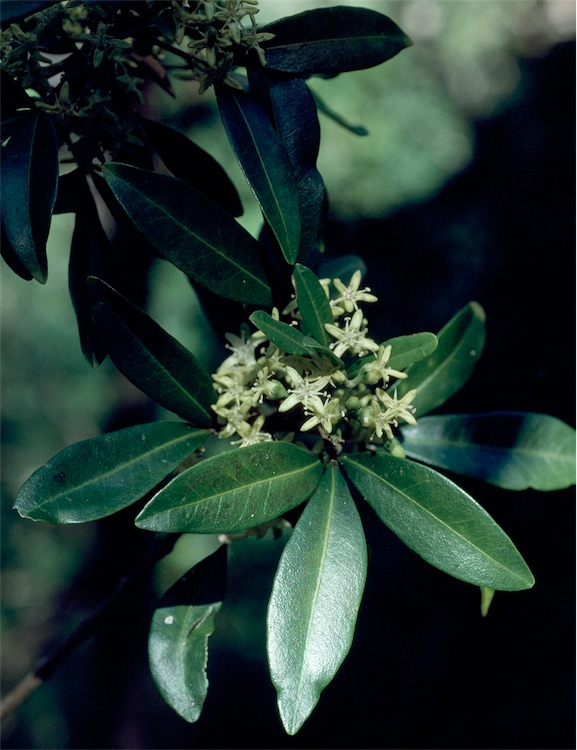
- In Coffs Harbour Botanic Garden

Scientific classification
- Kingdom: Plantae
- Clade: Tracheophytes
- Clade: Angiosperms
- Clade: Eudicots
- Clade: Rosids
- Order: Sapindales
- Family: Rutaceae
- Genus: Acronychia
- Species: A. suberosa

Binomial name
- Acronychia suberosa C.T.White

= Acronychia suberosa =

Corky acronychia

Species of tree

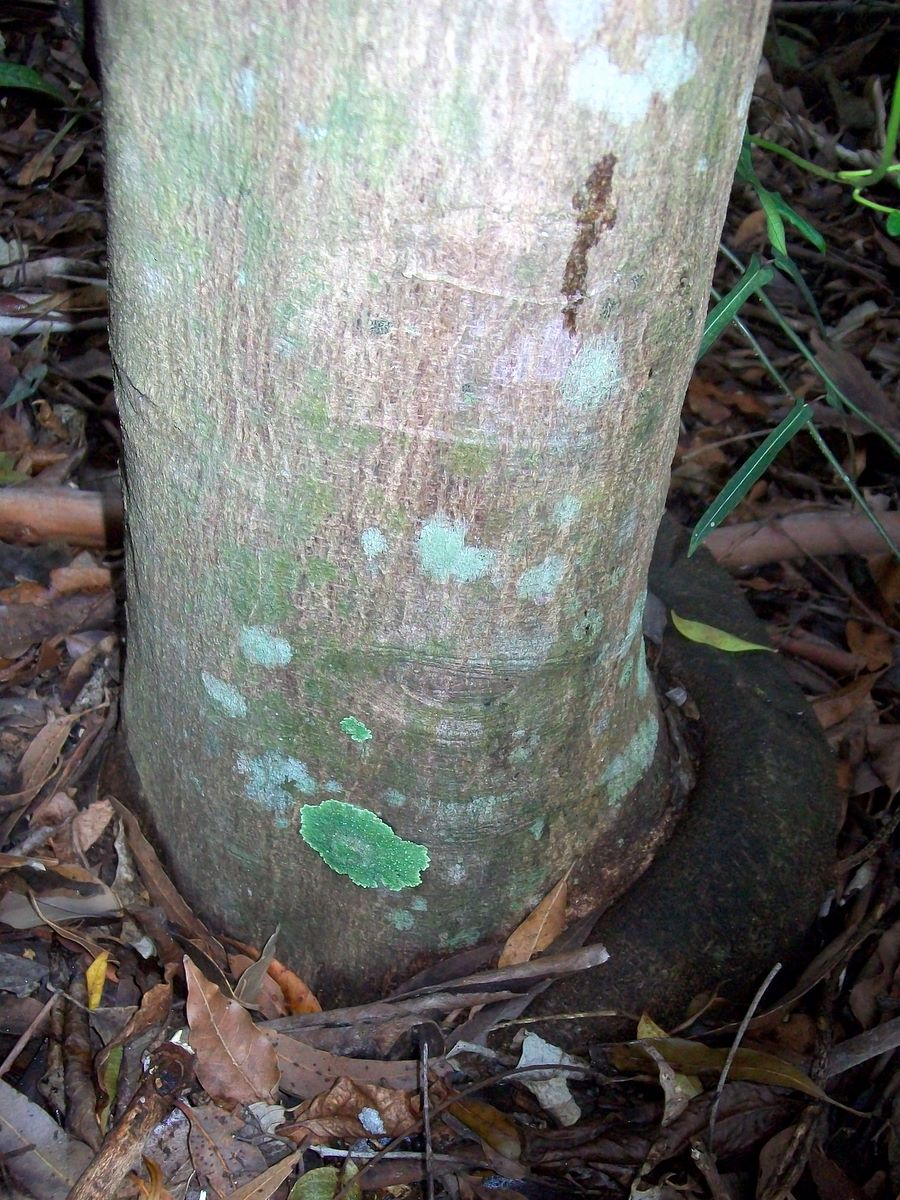
Trunk

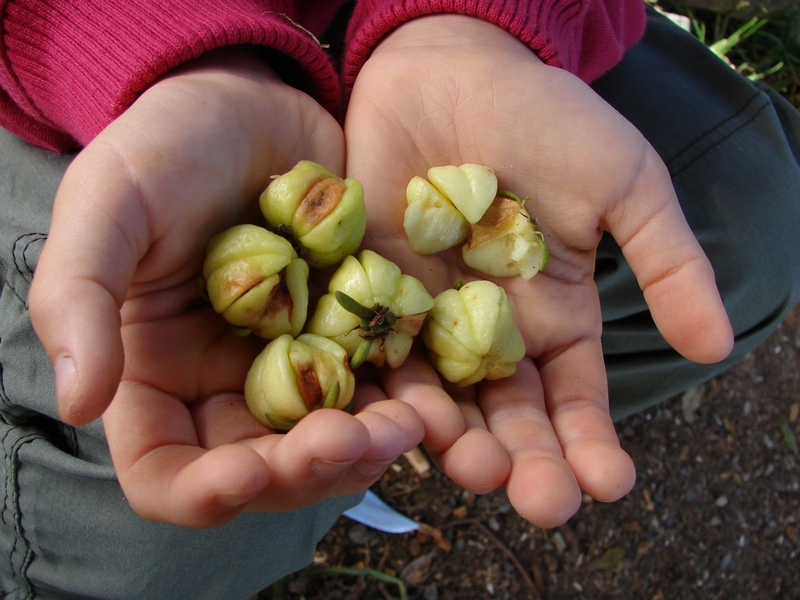
Fruit

Acronychia suberosa, commonly known as corky acronychia, is a species of small to medium-sized rainforest tree that is endemic to eastern Australia. It has mostly trifoliate leaves with elliptic to egg-shaped leaflets with the narrower end towards the base, small groups of cream-coloured flowers and elliptical to spherical, creamy yellow to whitish fruit.

== Description ==
Acronychia suberosa is a tree that typically grows to a height of 20 m (66 ft) with a stem diameter of 30 cm (12 in) and a thick, dark crown. The trunk is mostly cylindrical, but occasionally with flanges at the base and the bark is usually smooth, brown or red-brown. The leaves are trifoliate, mostly arranged in opposite pairs, the petiole 10–45 mm (0.4–2 in) long, the leaflets elliptical to egg-shaped with the narrower end towards the base, 35–85 mm (1.4–3.3 in) long and 9–30 mm (0.4–1 in) wide on a petiolule up to 10 mm (0.4 in) long. The flowers are arranged in cymes 18–35 mm (0.7–1 in) long, the individual flowers on a pedicel 1–3.5 mm (0.04–0.1 in) long. The four sepals are 2–3 mm (0.08–0.1 in) wide, the four petals cream-coloured and 6–9 mm (0.2–0.4 in) long and the eight stamens alternate in length. Flowering mainly occurs in February and the fruit is a fleshy, creamy yellow to whitish, elliptical to more or less spherical drupe 12–15 mm (0.5–0.6 in) long. The fruit matures from March to June.

== Taxonomy ==
Acronychia suberosa was first formally described in 1932 by Cyril Tenison White in Proceedings of the Royal Society of Queensland from specimens collected in Lamington National Park in 1929. The specific epithet suberosa means 'corky', referring to the bark on older trees.

== Distribution and habitat ==
Corky acronychia grows from the Richmond River, New South Wales to just over the border at the McPherson Range in southeastern Queensland at altitudes of 200–1,000 m (660–3,280 ft). The habitat is subtropical or warm temperate rainforest on basalt soils in high rainfall areas.

== Uses ==
=== Food ===
The fruit is edible but acidic.

=== Horticulture ===
Removal of the flesh from the seed is advised for regeneration. Around 30% of the seeds may germinate in five months.
