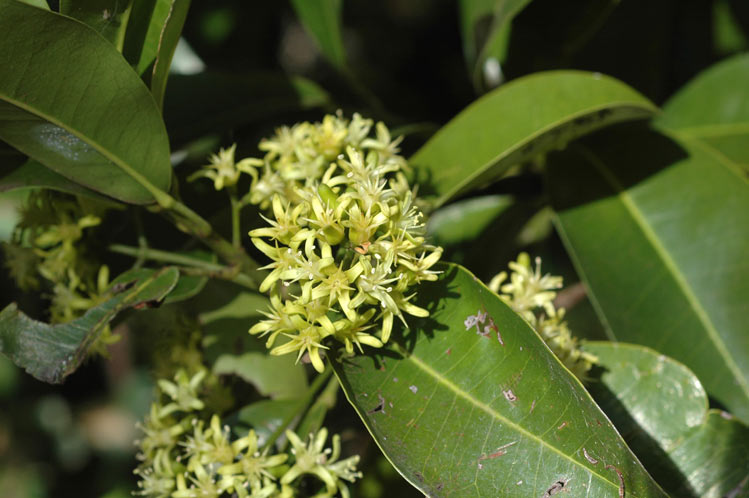
- Acronychia littoralis in the ANBG

Conservation status
- Endangered (EPBC Act)

Scientific classification
- Kingdom: Plantae
- Clade: Tracheophytes
- Clade: Angiosperms
- Clade: Eudicots
- Clade: Rosids
- Order: Sapindales
- Family: Rutaceae
- Genus: Acronychia
- Species: A. littoralis

Binomial name
- Acronychia littoralis T.G.Hartley & J.B.Williams

= Acronychia littoralis =

Scented acronychia

Species of flowering plant

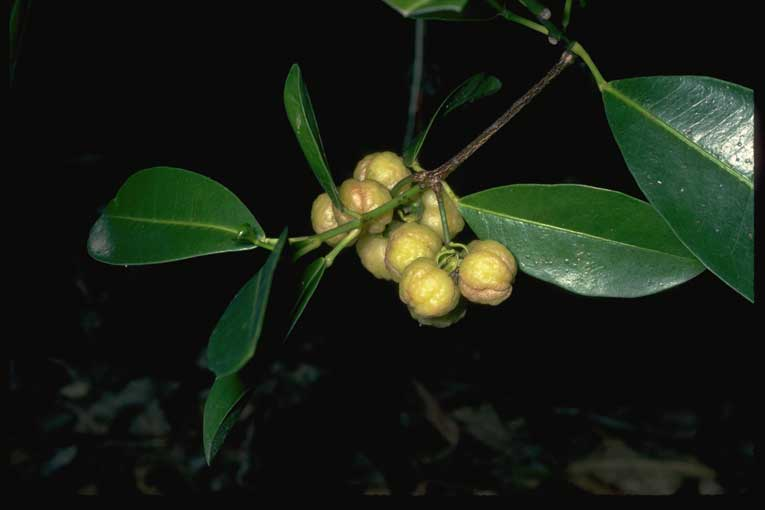
Fruit

Acronychia littoralis, commonly known as the scented acronychia, is a species of small tree that is endemic to eastern coastal Australia. It has simple, glabrous, elliptic to egg-shaped leaves, small groups of yellow flowers and egg-shaped to more or less spherical creamy-yellow fruit.

== Description ==
Acronychia littoralis is a tree that typically grows to a height of 6–8 m (20–26 ft) and has a straight, grey, cylindrical trunk. The leaves are glabrous, arranged in opposite pairs, broadly elliptical to broadly egg-shaped with the narrower end towards the base, mostly 40–140 mm (1.6–5.5 in) long and 30–65 mm (1.2–2.6 in) wide on a petiole 10–25 mm (0.39–0.98 in) long. The flowers are mainly arranged in leaf axils in cymes 20–60 mm (0.79–2.36 in) long, each flower on a pedicel 1.5–3.5 mm (0.059–0.138 in) long. The four sepals are 2.5–3 mm (0.098–0.118 in) wide, the four petals yellow and 8–9 mm (0.31–0.35 in) long and the eight stamens alternate in length. Flowering occurs from February to March and the fruit is a fleshy creamy yellow, egg-shaped to more or less spherical drupe 8–14 mm (0.31–0.55 in) long with four lobes separated by shallow fissures.

== Taxonomy ==
Acronychia littoralis was first formally described in 1984 by Thomas Hartley and J.B. Williams in the journal Brunonia from specimens collected by J.B. Williams near Brunswick Heads in 1979.

== Distribution and habitat ==
Scented acronychia grows in rainforest within 2 km (1.2 mi) of the coast between Fraser Island in Queensland and Iluka in New South Wales.

== Conservation status ==
This acronchyia is classified as "endangered" under the Australian Government Environment Protection and Biodiversity Conservation Act 1999, the New South Wales Government Biodiversity Conservation Act 2016 and the Queensland Government Nature Conservation Act 1992. The main threats to the species include inappropriate use of four-wheel drive vehicles, weed invasion and salt burn at exposed sites.

== Gallery ==
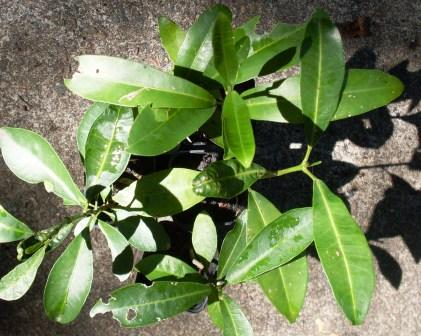
Juvenile leaves

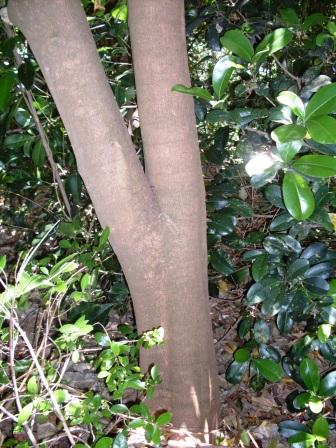
Trunk

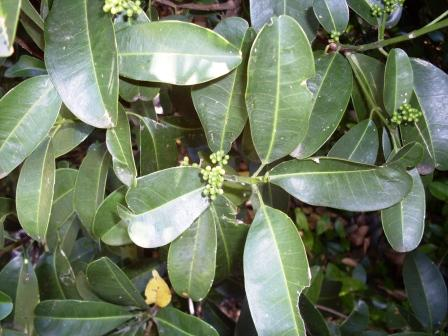
Flower buds and leaves

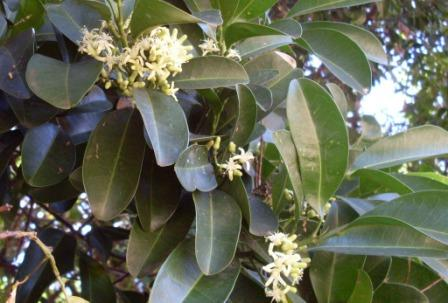
Flowers and leaves

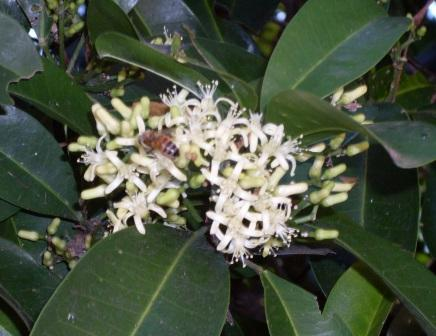
Flowers and leaves

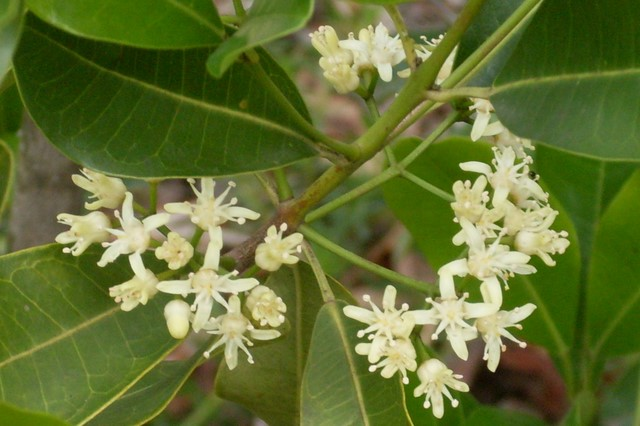
Flowers and leaves

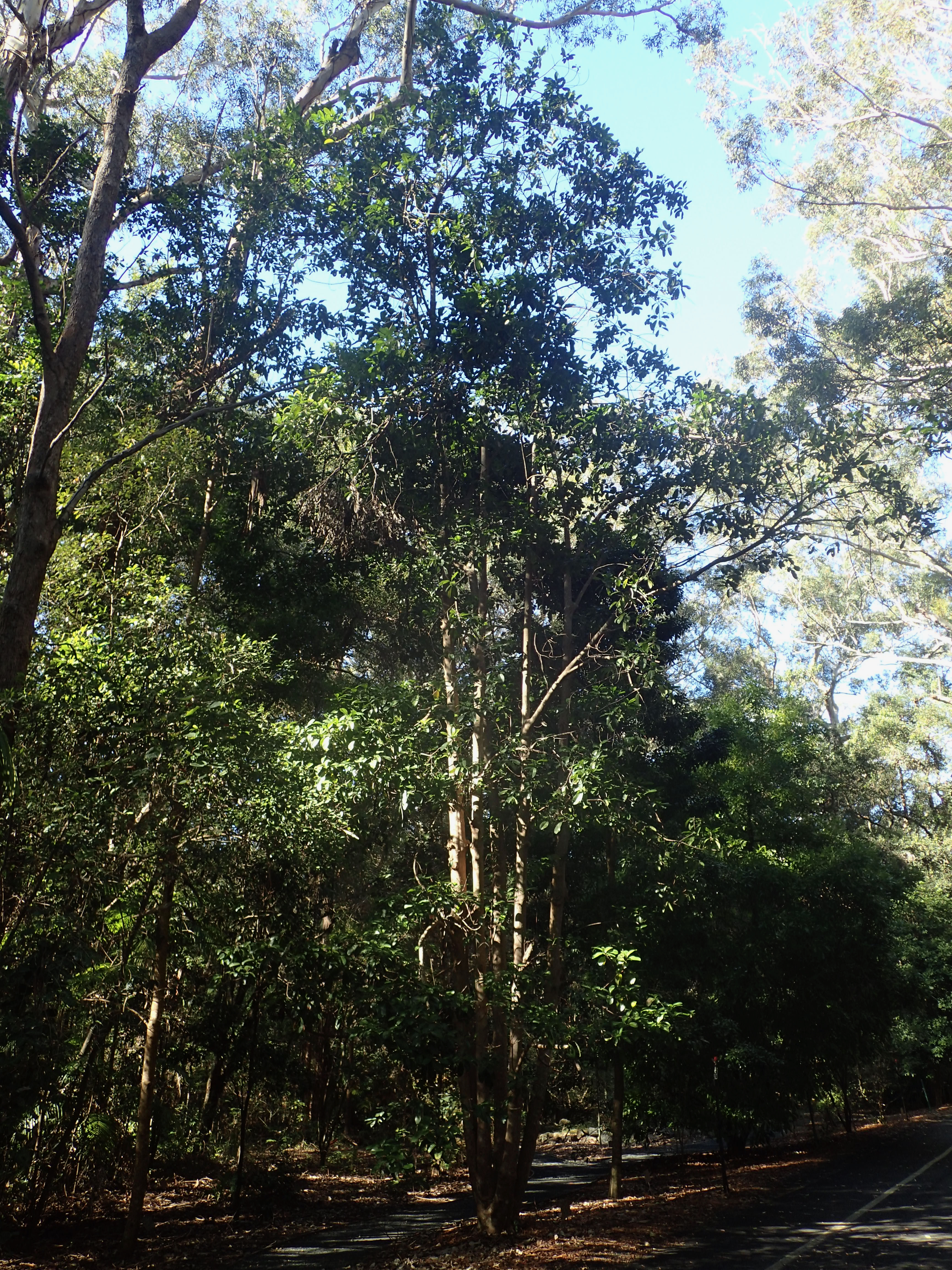
Habit in Coffs Harbour Botanic Garden
