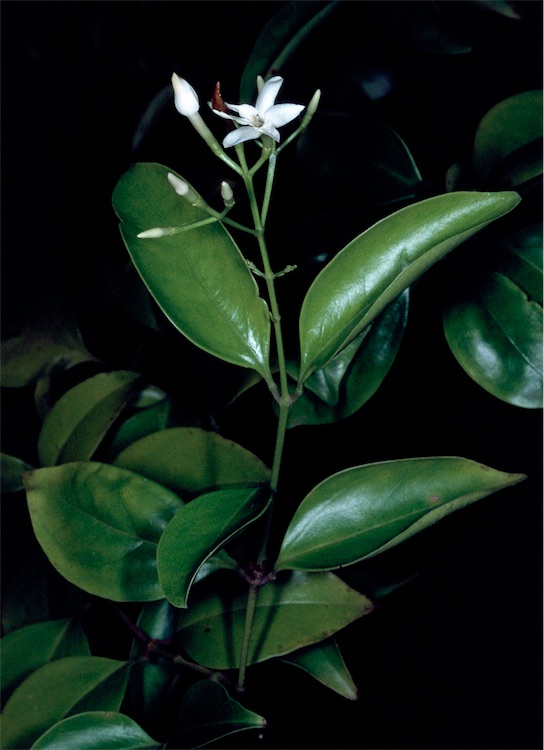
- Acronychia pauciflora in the Australian National Botanic Gardens

Scientific classification
- Kingdom: Plantae
- Clade: Tracheophytes
- Clade: Angiosperms
- Clade: Eudicots
- Clade: Rosids
- Order: Sapindales
- Family: Rutaceae
- Genus: Acronychia
- Species: A. pauciflora

Binomial name
- Acronychia pauciflora C.T.White

= Acronychia pauciflora =

Few-flowered acronychia

Species of flowering plant

Acronychia pauciflora, commonly known as few-flowered acronychia or soft acronychia, is a species of shrub or small tree that is endemic to eastern Australia. It has simple, egg-shaped leaves with the narrower end towards the base, greenish white flowers arranged in small groups, mostly in leaf axils and fleshy, more or less spherical fruit.

== Description ==
Acronychia pauciflora is a shrub or tree that typically grows to a height of 10 m (33 ft) and has wrinkled or finely scaly, creamy-fawn bark. The leaves are simple, 20–95 mm (0.79–3.74 in) long and 10–48 mm (0.39–1.89 in) wide on a petiole usually 4–14 mm (0.16–0.55 in) long. The flowers are arranged in small groups 8–12 mm (0.31–0.47 in) long, mainly in leaf axils, each flower on a pedicel 0.5–2 mm (0.020–0.079 in) long. The four sepals are about 1 mm (0.039 in) wide, the four greenish white petals 4–6 mm (0.16–0.24 in) long, and the eight stamens alternate in length. Flowering occurs from December to July and the fruit is a fleshy drupe 7–9 mm (0.28–0.35 in) long and more or less spherical.

== Taxonomy ==
Acronychia pauciflora was first formally described in 1946 by Cyril Tenison White in the Proceedings of the Royal Society of Queensland.

== Distribution and habitat ==
This acronychia grows between Broad Sound in central eastern Queensland, the Richmond River in north-eastern New South Wales and as far inland as the Carnarvon Range. It grows in rainforest and in brigalow (Acacia harpophylla) scrub from sea level to an altitude of 650 m (2,130 ft).

== Conservation status ==
This species is classified as of "least concern" under the Queensland Government Nature Conservation Act 1992.
