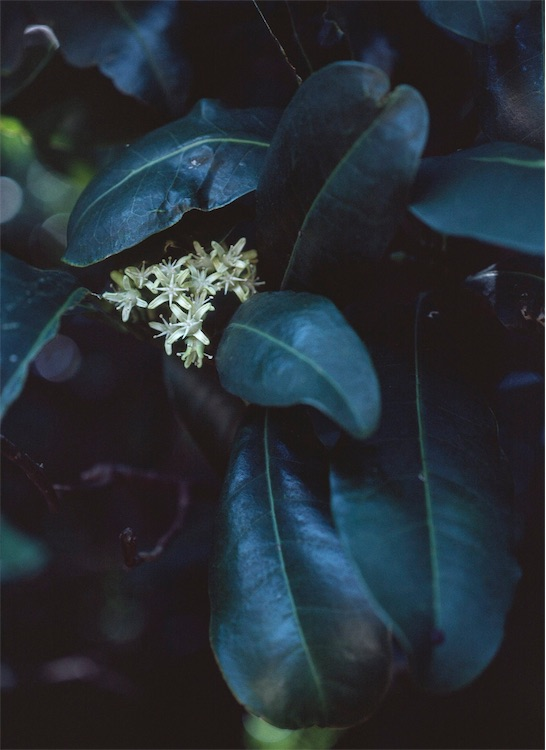
- In the Royal Botanic Garden, Sydney

Scientific classification
- Kingdom: Plantae
- Clade: Tracheophytes
- Clade: Angiosperms
- Clade: Eudicots
- Clade: Rosids
- Order: Sapindales
- Family: Rutaceae
- Genus: Acronychia
- Species: A. wilcoxiana

Binomial name
- Acronychia wilcoxiana (F.Muell.) T.G.Hartley

Synonyms
- Errerana wilcoxiana (F.Muell.) Kuntze; Pleiococca wilcoxiana F.Muell.

= Acronychia wilcoxiana =

Silver aspen

Species of tree endemic to Australia

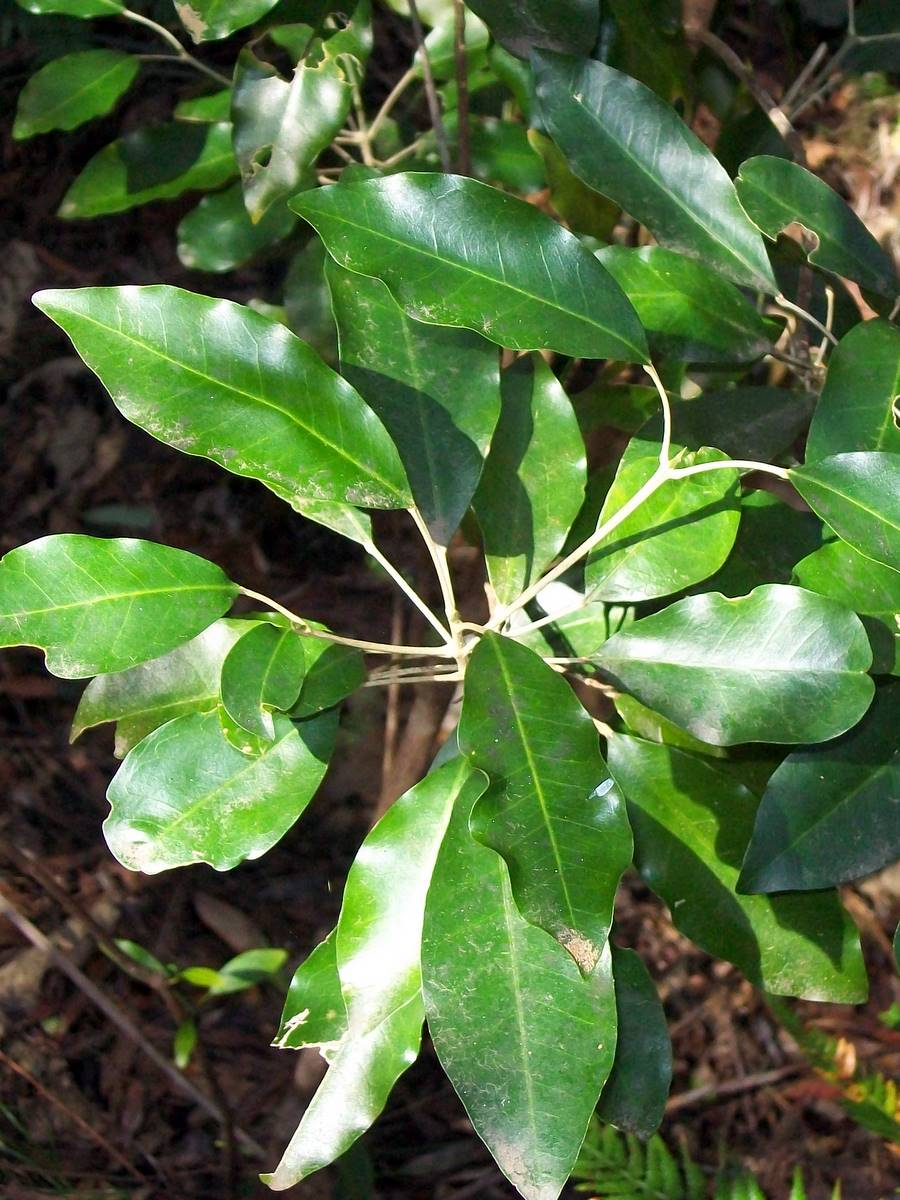
Leaves in Stony Range Botanic Garden, Dee Why

Acronychia wilcoxiana, commonly known as silver aspen, doughwood, snowwood or mushyberry, is a species of small rainforest tree that is endemic to eastern Australia. It has simple, elliptical to egg-shaped leaves with the narrower end towards the base, relatively large groups of whitish flowers in leaf axils and broadly oval to more or less spherical, white fruit.

== Description ==
Acronychia wilcoxiana is a tree that typically grows to a height of 9–15 m (30–49 ft) with pinkish brown or dark brown bark and a crown of dark green leaves. The leaves are arranged in opposite pairs, and are elliptical to egg-shaped with the narrower end towards the base, 70–210 mm (3–8 in) long and 25–90 mm (1–4 in) wide on a petiole 6–30 mm (0.2–1 in) long. The flowers are arranged in relatively large groups 30–65 mm (1.2–2.6 in) long in leaf axils, each flower on a pedicel 0.5–3 mm (0.02–0.1 in) long. The four sepals are 1.5–3 mm (0.06–0.1 in) wide, the four petals whitish and 7.5–9 mm (0.3–0.4 in) long and the eight stamens alternate in length. Flowering occurs from January to May and the fruit is a fleshy, conical to spherical drupe 12–15 mm (0.5–0.6 in) long. The seeds are black, oval and about 4.5 mm (0.2 in) long.

== Taxonomy ==
The silver aspen was first formally described in 1875 by Ferdinand von Mueller, who gave it the name Pleiococca wilcoxiana and published the description in Fragmenta phytographiae Australiae. In 1974 Thomas Hartley changed the name to Acronychia wilcoxiana in the Journal of the Arnold Arboretum. The species name honours James Fowler Wilcox, a 19th-century collector of birds and plants in northern New South Wales.

== Distribution and habitat ==
Acronychia wilcoxiana grows in rainforest, mostly between Fraser Island in south-east Queensland and Gosford in central-eastern New South Wales and from sea level to an altitude of 450 m (1,480 ft), but a small population of about eight mature trees has been recorded at Primbee in the Illawarra district.

== Ecology ==
The fruit of A. wilcoxiana are eaten by rainforest birds, including the wompoo fruit-dove.

== Conservation status ==
Silver aspen is listed as of "least concern" under the Queensland Government Nature Conservation Act 1992.

== Use in horticulture ==
Germination from seed is not easy; however, the removal of the fleshy aril from the seed will improve results. Seeds may germinate after 6 to 12 months.
