= Acronychia eungellensis =

Eungella aspen

Conservation status
- Near Threatened (NCA)

Scientific classification
- Kingdom: Plantae
- Clade: Tracheophytes
- Clade: Angiosperms
- Clade: Eudicots
- Clade: Rosids
- Order: Sapindales
- Family: Rutaceae
- Genus: Acronychia
- Species: A. eungellensis

Binomial name
- Acronychia eungellensis T.G.Hartley& B.Hyland

Species of flowering plant

Acronychia eungellensis, commonly known as Eungella aspen, is a species of small rainforest tree that is endemic to a restricted area in east-central Queensland. It has simple, elliptic leaves on cylindrical stems, flowers in small groups in leaf axils, and fleshy fruit that is elliptic to egg-shaped in outline.

== Description ==
Acronychia eungellensis is a tree that typically grows to a height of 20 m (66 ft) and has more or less cylindrical stems. The leaves are simple, glabrous and elliptical, 55–90 mm (2.2–3.5 in) long and 20–45 mm (0.79–1.77 in) wide on a petiole 10–20 mm (0.39–0.79 in) long. The flowers are arranged in small to medium-sized groups 20–90 mm (0.79–3.54 in) long, each flower on a pedicel 4–5.5 mm (0.16–0.22 in) long. The four sepals are 1.5–2 mm (0.059–0.079 in) wide, the four petals 6.5–7.5 mm (0.26–0.30 in) long and the eight stamens alternate in length. Flowering occurs in October and the fruit is a fleshy drupe about 12 mm (0.47 in) long and egg-shaped to elliptical in outline.

== Taxonomy ==
Acronychia eungellensis was first formally described in 1982 by Thomas Gordon Hartley and Bernard Hyland in the journal Austrobaileya from specimens collected in the Eungella National Park.

== Distribution and habitat ==
This tree grows in rainforest but is restricted to the Eungella National Park and nearby private land at an altitude of about 900 m (3,000 ft) in central-eastern Queensland.

== Conservation status ==
Eungella aspen is classified as "near threatened" under the Queensland Government Nature Conservation Act 1992.
