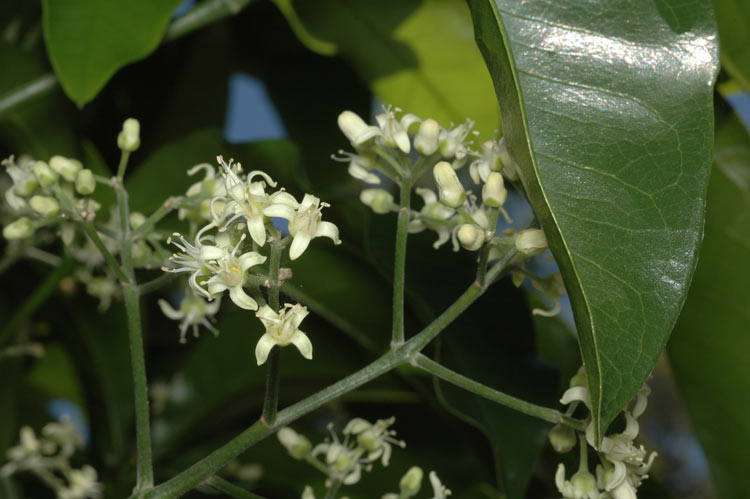
- In Mount Coot-tha Botanic Gardens

Scientific classification
- Kingdom: Plantae
- Clade: Tracheophytes
- Clade: Angiosperms
- Clade: Eudicots
- Clade: Rosids
- Order: Sapindales
- Family: Rutaceae
- Genus: Acronychia
- Species: A. octandra

Binomial name
- Acronychia octandra (F.Muell.) T.G.Hartley

Synonyms
- Euodia octandra F.Muell.; Melicope australasica F.Muell. nom. inval., pro syn.; Melicope australasica F.Muell. ex Benth. nom. illeg.; Melicope octandra (F.Muell.) Druce

= Acronychia octandra =

Doughwood

Species of tree

Acronychia octandra, commonly known as doughwood, silver birch or soapwood, is a species of rainforest tree that is endemic to eastern coastal areas of Australia. It has mostly trifoliate leaves with elliptic to egg-shaped leaflets, greenish-white flowers arranged in groups in leaf axils and fleshy fruit of four carpels fused at the base.

== Description ==
Acronychia octandra is a tree that typically grows to a height of 27 m (89 ft). The leaves are mostly trifoliate, the leaflets narrow elliptical to narrow egg-shaped with the narrower end towards the base, 80–220 mm (3.1–8.7 in) long and 20–80 mm (0.8–3 in) wide, the petiole 20–80 mm (0.8–3 in) long but the petiolule of the leaflets is more or less absent. The flowers are arranged in panicles 5–24 mm (0.2–0.9 in) long, the individual flowers on a pedicel 3–6 mm (0.1–0.2 in) long. The four sepals are 1–2 mm (0.04–0.08 in) wide, the four petals greenish-white and 6–8 mm (0.2–0.3 in) long and the eight stamens alternate in length. Flowering occurs from December to April and the fruit is a fleshy drupe of four carpels fused at the base, each carpel oval to elliptical in outline, 3–3.5 mm (0.12–0.14 in) long.

== Taxonomy ==
Doughwood was first formally described in 1860 by Ferdinand von Mueller, who gave it the name Euodia octandra and published the description in Fragmenta phytographiae Australiae from specimens collected near the Clarence River by Hermann Beckler. In 1991 Thomas Gordon Hartley changed the name to Acronychia octandra in Australian Systematic Botany. The specific epithet octandra refers to the eight stamens in the flower.

== Distribution and habitat ==
Acronychia octandra grows in subtropical and warm-temperate habitats from sea level to an altitude of 900 m (3,000 ft) from the McPherson Range in south-east Queensland south to near the Clarence River in New South Wales.

== Use in horticulture ==
Germination from fresh seeds can occur rapidly, as early as 11 days. However, some seeds may germinate five months after sowing.
