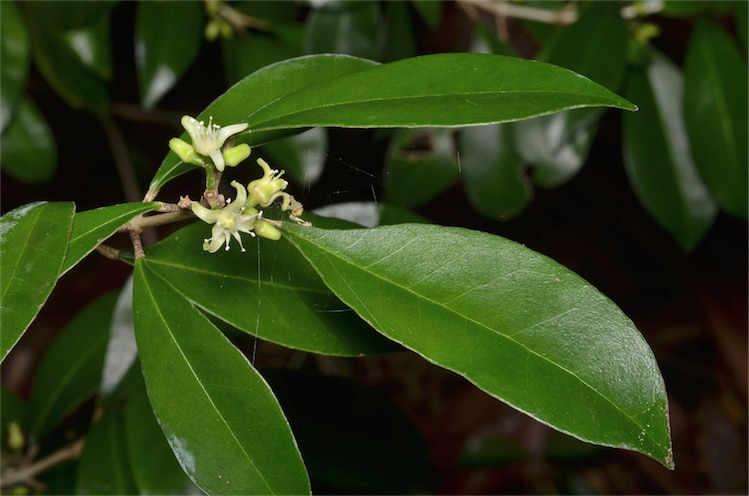
- In the Australian National Botanic Gardens

Scientific classification
- Kingdom: Plantae
- Clade: Tracheophytes
- Clade: Angiosperms
- Clade: Eudicots
- Clade: Rosids
- Order: Sapindales
- Family: Rutaceae
- Genus: Acronychia
- Species: A. parviflora

Binomial name
- Acronychia parviflora C.T.White

= Acronychia parviflora =

Species of flowering plant

Acronychia parviflora is a species of shrub or small rainforest tree that is endemic to north-eastern Queensland. It has simple, egg-shaped to elliptical leaves, flowers arranged singly or in small groups in leaf axils and fleshy, more or less spherical fruit.

== Description ==
Acronychia parviflora is a shrub or tree that typically grows to a height of 8 m (26 ft) and has cylindrical or slightly compressed stems. The leaves are simple, mostly 30–100 mm (1.2–3.9 in) long and 14–45 mm (0.55–1.77 in) wide on a petiole 5–15 mm (0.20–0.59 in) long. The flowers are arranged singly or in small groups 5–11 mm (0.20–0.43 in) long in leaf axils, each flower on a pedicel 0.5–2 mm (0.020–0.079 in) long. The four sepals are about 1 mm (0.039 in) wide, the four petals 2.5–3.5 mm (0.098–0.138 in) long with a small hook on the tip, and the eight stamens alternate in length. Flowering and fruiting occurs in most months and the fruit is a fleshy drupe 7–8 mm (0.28–0.31 in) long and more or less spherical.

== Taxonomy ==
Acronychia parviflora was first formally described in 1933 by Cyril Tenison White in the journal, Contributions from the Arnold Arboretum of Harvard University.

== Distribution and habitat ==
This acronychia grows in rainforest between Mount Lewis and Tully Falls, at altitudes between 200 and 1,350 m (660 and 4,430 ft) in tropical north Queensland.

== Conservation status ==
This species is classified as of "least concern" under the Queensland Government Nature Conservation Act 1992.
