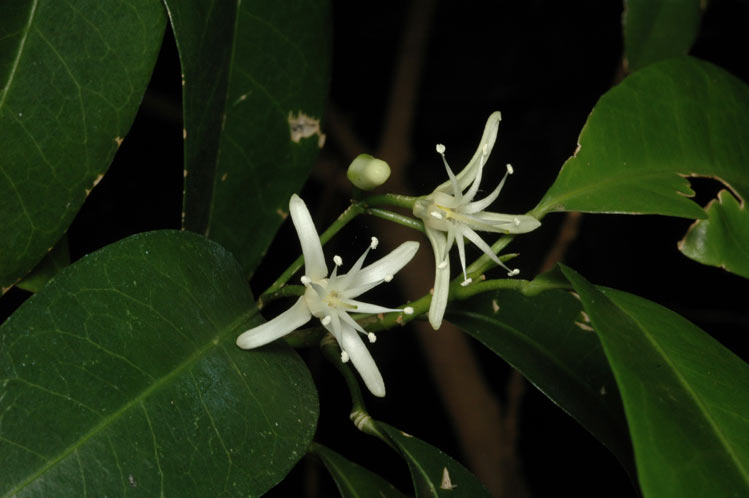
- Acronychia baeuerlenii in the ANBG

Scientific classification
- Kingdom: Plantae
- Clade: Tracheophytes
- Clade: Angiosperms
- Clade: Eudicots
- Clade: Rosids
- Order: Sapindales
- Family: Rutaceae
- Genus: Acronychia
- Species: A. baeuerlenii

Binomial name
- Acronychia baeuerlenii T.G.Hartley

= Acronychia baeuerlenii =

Byron Bay acronychia

Species of flowering plant

Acronychia baeuerlenii, commonly known as Byron Bay acronychia, is a species of rainforest shrub or small tree endemic to eastern Australia. It has simple, glabrous leaves, small groups of flowers and fleshy oval fruit.

== Description ==
Acronychia baeuerlenii is a shrub or tree that typically grows to a height of 10 m (33 ft). Its trunk is smooth, grey about 200 mm (7.9 in) in diameter and has more or less cylindrical young branchlets. The leaves are arranged in opposite pairs, simple, glossy green, glabrous and elliptical, 50–110 mm (2.0–4.3 in) long and 20–45 mm (0.79–1.77 in) wide on a petiole 5–18 mm (0.20–0.71 in) long. The flowers are white or cream-coloured and arranged in leaf axils in small cymes 30–70 mm (1.2–2.8 in) long, each flower on a glabrous pedicel 4–9.5 mm (0.16–0.37 in) long. The four sepals are 1.5–2.5 mm (0.059–0.098 in) wide and the four petals 8.5–14 mm (0.33–0.55 in) long and there are eight stamens. Flowering occurs between October and February and the fruit is a fleshy, creamy to light green, oval, four-celled drupe 9–15 mm (0.35–0.59 in) in diameter with eight ribs. The fruit matures between March and May and each cell contain one or two sticky black seeds 3–5 mm (0.12–0.20 in) long.

== Taxonomy ==
Acronychia baeuerlenii was first formally described in 1974 by Thomas Gordon Hartley in the Journal of the Arnold Arboretum from specimens collected near Burringba in 1898.

== Distribution and habitat ==
Byron Bay acronychia is found between the Richmond River, New South Wales in New South Wales to Lamington National Park just over the border in Queensland. It is an understorey plant in warm temperate rainforest, occasionally in sub tropical rainforest on richer alluvial or basaltic soils, up to 800 m (2,600 ft) above sea level.

== Conservation status ==
Byron Bay acronychia is classified as of "least concern" under the Queensland Government Nature Conservation Act 1992.

== Essential oils ==
The leaves of this species contain a number of essential oils.
