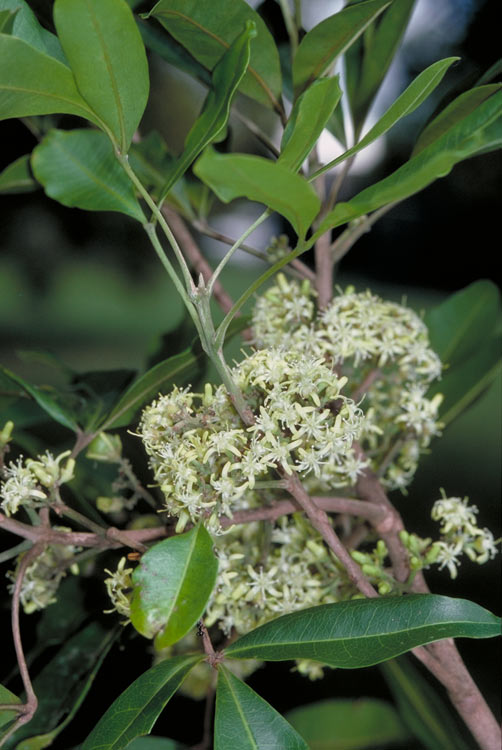

Scientific classification
- Kingdom: Plantae
- Clade: Tracheophytes
- Clade: Angiosperms
- Clade: Eudicots
- Clade: Rosids
- Order: Sapindales
- Family: Rutaceae
- Genus: Acronychia
- Species: A. acronychioides

Binomial name
- Acronychia acronychioides (F.Muell.) T.G.Hartley

Synonyms
- Acronychia melicopoides F.Muell. nom. illeg.; Acronychia melicopoides F.Muell. var. melicopoides; Euodia acronychioides F.Muell.; Jambolifera melicopodes Kuntze orth. var.; Jambolifera melicopoides (F.Muell.) Kuntze nom. illeg.; Melicope acronychioides F.Muell. nom. inval., pro syn.

= Acronychia acronychioides =

White aspen

Species of flowering plant

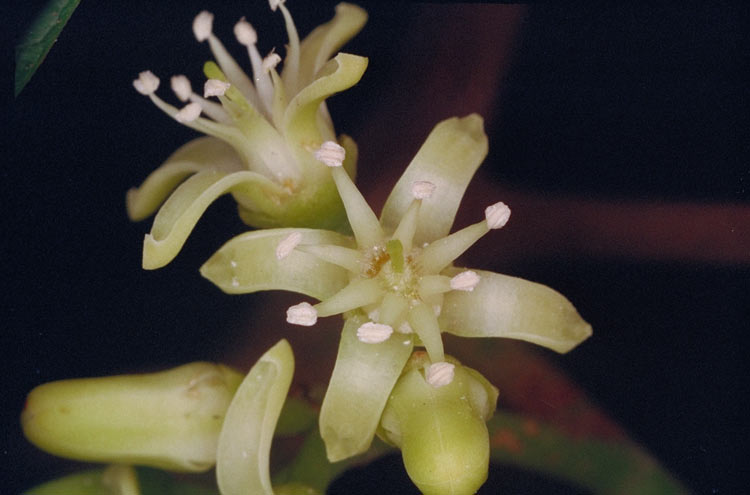
Flower detail

Acronychia acronychioides, commonly known as white aspen, is a species of small to medium-sized rainforest tree that is endemic to north-eastern Queensland. It has trifoliate leaves with elliptic to egg-shaped leaflets on stems that are more or less cylindrical, creamy yellow flowers in large groups in leaf axils and fleshy, pear-shaped or spherical fruit.

== Description ==
Acronychia acronychioides is a tree that typically grows to a height of 25 m (82 ft) and has more or less cylindrical stems. The leaves are usually trifoliate on a petiole 20–80 mm (0.79–3.15 in) long. The leaflets are elliptic to egg-shaped with the narrower end towards the base, 70–210 mm (2.8–8.3 in) long and 20–65 mm (0.79–2.56 in) wide on a petiolule up to 8 mm (0.31 in) long. The flowers are arranged in large groups 30–100 mm (1.2–3.9 in) long in leaf axils, each flower on a pedicel 3–7.5 mm (0.12–0.30 in) long. The four sepals are 2–3 mm (0.079–0.118 in) wide, the four petals 8–10 mm (0.31–0.39 in) long and the eight stamens alternate in length. Flowering occurs from April to May and the fruit is a fleshy, pear-shaped to spherical drupe 8–13 mm (0.31–0.51 in) long.

== Taxonomy ==
White aspen was first formally described in 1864 by Ferdinand von Mueller who gave it the name Euodia acronychioides and published the description in Fragmenta phytographiae Australiae. In 1974, Thomas Gordon Hartley changed the name to Acronychia acronychioides in the Journal of the Arnold Arboretum.

== Distribution and habitat ==
This tree grows as an understorey tree in well-developed rainforest between the Kutini-Payamu (Iron Range) National Park in Cape York Peninsula to the Eungella Range in central eastern Queensland, at altitudes from sea level 1,200 m (3,900 ft).

== Conservation status ==
White aspen is classified as least concern under the Queensland Government Nature Conservation Act 1992.
