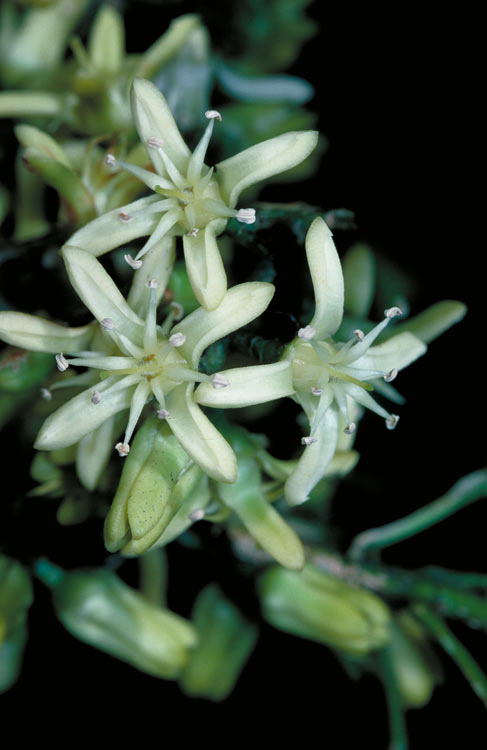

Scientific classification
- Kingdom: Plantae
- Clade: Tracheophytes
- Clade: Angiosperms
- Clade: Eudicots
- Clade: Rosids
- Order: Sapindales
- Family: Rutaceae
- Genus: Acronychia
- Species: A. crassipetala

Binomial name
- Acronychia crassipetala T.G.Hartley

= Acronychia crassipetala =

Crater aspen

Species of flowering plant

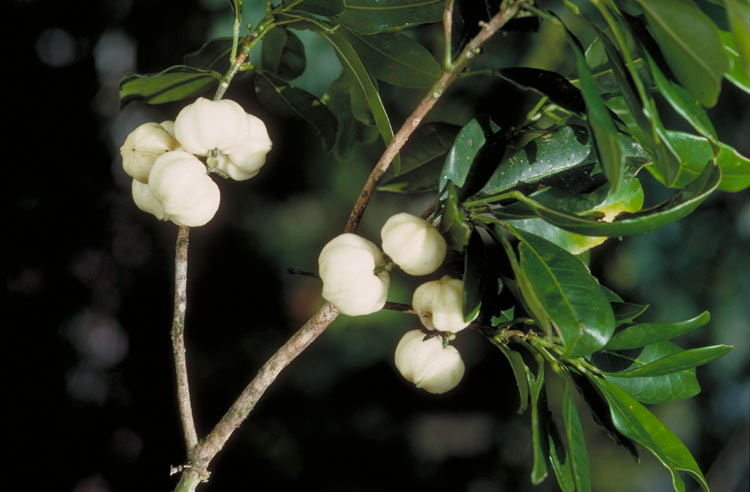
Fruit

Acronychia crassipetala, commonly known as crater aspen, is a species of small rainforest tree that is endemic to north-eastern Queensland. It has simple, elliptic to egg-shaped leaves on cylindrical stems, flowers in small groups, and fleshy, more or less spherical fruit.

== Description ==
Acronychia crassipetala is a tree that typically grows to a height of 18 m (59 ft) and has more or less cylindrical stems. The leaves are simple, glabrous, elliptical to egg-shaped with the narrower end towards the base, 60–130 mm (2.4–5.1 in) long and 20–55 mm (0.79–2.17 in) wide on a petiole 9–25 mm (0.35–0.98 in) long. The flowers are arranged in small groups 20–35 mm (0.79–1.38 in) long, each flower on a pedicel 1–2 mm (0.039–0.079 in) long. The four sepals are 2–3 mm (0.079–0.118 in) wide, the four petals 9–12 mm (0.35–0.47 in) long and the eight stamens alternate in length. Flowering occurs from October to April and the fruit is a fleshy, more or less spherical drupe 10–15 mm (0.39–0.59 in) long.

== Taxonomy ==
Acronychia crassipetala was first formally described in 1974 by Thomas Gordon Hartley in the Journal of the Arnold Arboretum from specimens collected on Mount Spurgeon.

== Distribution and habitat ==
This tree grows in rainforest between the Windsor Tablelands and the Atherton Tableland at an altitudes of 800–1,200 m (2,600–3,900 ft).

== Conservation status ==
Crater aspen is classified as of "least concern" under the Queensland Government Nature Conservation Act 1992.
