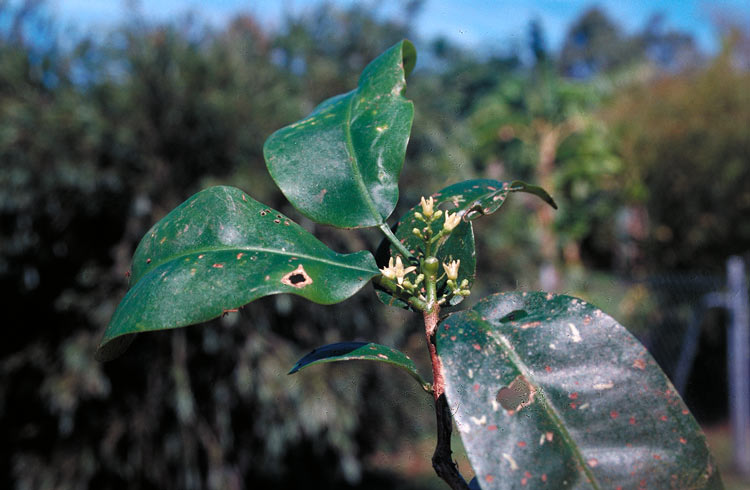

Conservation status
- Near Threatened (NCA)

Scientific classification
- Kingdom: Plantae
- Clade: Tracheophytes
- Clade: Angiosperms
- Clade: Eudicots
- Clade: Rosids
- Order: Sapindales
- Family: Rutaceae
- Genus: Acronychia
- Species: A. acuminata

Binomial name
- Acronychia acuminata T.G.Hartley

= Acronychia acuminata =

Thornton aspen

Species of flowering plant

Acronychia acuminata, commonly known as Thornton aspen, is a species of shrub or small rainforest tree that is endemic to north-eastern Queensland. It has simple leaves on stems that are more or cylindrical, flowers in small groups in leaf axils and fleshy, oval to spherical fruit.

== Description ==
Acronychia acuminata is a tree that typically grows to a height of 5–8 m (16–26 ft) but flowers when only shrub-sized. It has more or less cylindrical stems and simple, glabous, elliptical leaves 90–150 mm (3.5–5.9 in) long and 30–50 mm (1.2–2.0 in) wide on a petiole 15–35 mm (0.59–1.38 in) long. The flowers are arranged in small groups about 15 mm (0.59 in) long in leaf axils, each flower on a pedicel 1–2 mm (0.039–0.079 in) long. The four sepals are about 1.2 mm (0.047 in) wide, the four petals about 3.5 mm (0.14 in) long and the eight stamens alternate in length. Flowering occurs in July and the fruit is a fleshy, oval or spherical drupe 12–13 mm (0.47–0.51 in) long.

== Taxonomy ==
Acronychia acuminata was first formally described in 1974 by Thomas Gordon Hartley in the Journal of the Arnold Arboretum from specimens collected between the Daintree and Bloomfield Rivers.

== Distribution and habitat ==
Thornton Aspen grows in rainforest between the Bloomfield Range and Daintree Range, at an altitudes of about 600 m (2,000 ft).

== Conservation status ==
Thornton aspen is classified as "near threatened" under the Queensland Government Nature Conservation Act 1992.
