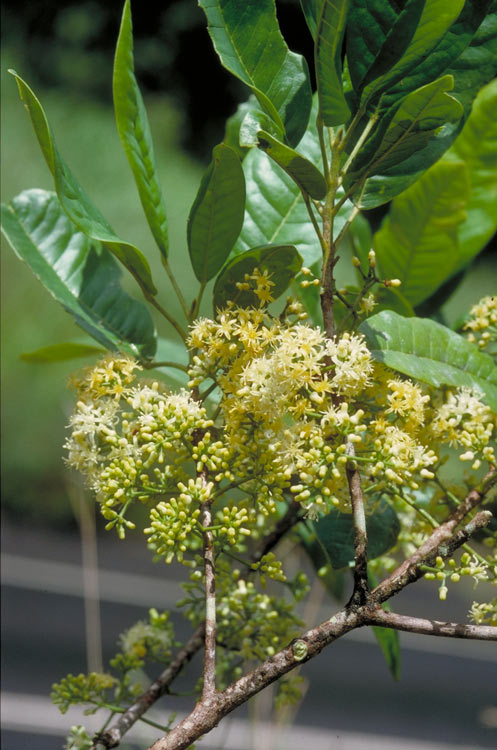

Scientific classification
- Kingdom: Plantae
- Clade: Tracheophytes
- Clade: Angiosperms
- Clade: Eudicots
- Clade: Rosids
- Order: Sapindales
- Family: Rutaceae
- Genus: Acronychia
- Species: A. vestita

Binomial name
- Acronychia vestita C.T.White

Synonyms
- Jambolifera vestita (F.Muell.) Kuntze

= Acronychia vestita =

White aspen

Species of flowering plant

Acronychia vestita, commonly known as white aspen, lemon aspen, hairy aspen or fuzzy lemon aspen, is a species of rainforest tree that is endemic to Queensland. It has simple, elliptic to egg-shaped leaves with the narrower end towards the base, flowers arranged in relatively large groups, mostly in leaf axils and fleshy, pear-shaped to more or less spherical fruit.

== Description ==
Acronychia vestita is a tree that typically grows to a height of 21 m (69 ft). The leaves are simple, elliptic to egg-shaped with the narrower end towards the base, 80–230 mm (3.1–9.1 in) long and 38–115 mm (1.5–4.5 in) wide on a petiole 10–40 mm (0.39–1.57 in) long. The flowers are arranged in relatively large groups 40–70 mm (1.6–2.8 in) long, mainly in leaf axils, each flower on a pedicel 3–4.5 mm (0.12–0.18 in) long. The four sepals are 1–1.5 mm (0.039–0.059 in) wide, the four petals 6–7.5 mm (0.24–0.30 in) long, and the eight stamens alternate in length. Flowering occurs from February to March and the fruit is a fleshy, pear-shaped to more or less spherical drupe 10–20 mm (0.39–0.79 in) long.

== Taxonomy ==
Acronychia vestita was first formally described in 1864 by Ferdinand von Mueller in Fragmenta phytographiae Australiae.

== Distribution and habitat ==
White aspen grows in rainforest from sea level to an altitude of 900 m (3,000 ft) between Cairns and Rockingham Bay in near-coastal Queensland.

== Conservation status ==
This species is classified as of "least concern" under the Queensland Government Nature Conservation Act 1992.
