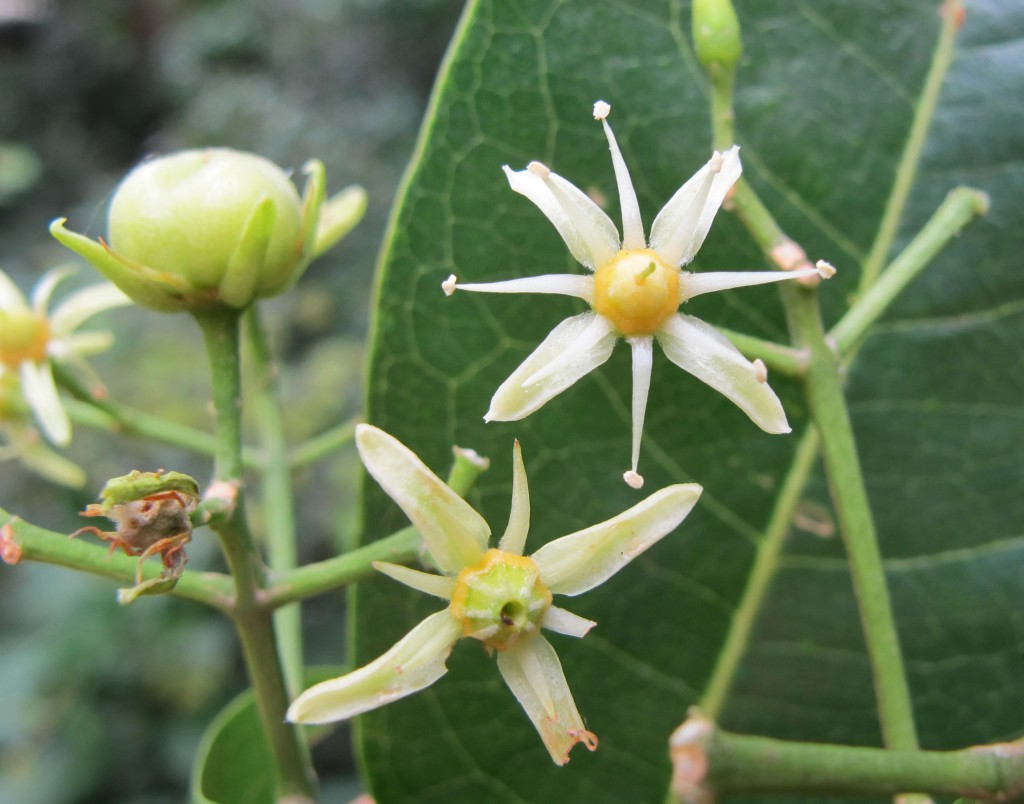
- Acronychia pedunculata

Scientific classification
- Kingdom: Plantae
- Clade: Tracheophytes
- Clade: Angiosperms
- Clade: Eudicots
- Clade: Rosids
- Order: Sapindales
- Family: Rutaceae
- Subfamily: Zanthoxyloideae
- Genus: Acronychia; J.R.Forst. & G.Forst.

Species
- See text.

Synonyms
- Cyminosma Gaertn. nom. illeg.; Errerana Kuntze nom. illeg.; Jambolifera L. nom. rej.; Pleiococca F.Muell.

= Acronychia =

Genus of flowering plants

Acronychia is a genus of about fifty species of plants in the rue family Rutaceae. The leaves are simple or pinnate, and the flowers bisexual with four sepals, four petals and eight stamens. They have a broad distribution including in India, Malesia, Australia and the islands of the western Pacific Ocean. About twenty species are endemic to Australia.

== Description ==
Plants in the genus Acronychia are shrubs or trees with simple or trifoliate leaves arranged in opposite pairs and with oil glands in the leaves. The flowers are arranged in leaf axils either singly or in cymes or panicles. The flowers are bisexual, with four sepals, four petals and eight stamens. The petals are free from each other, as are the stamens. The stigma is small, not differentiated from the style, the fruit is a drupe and the seeds are black.

== Taxonomy and naming ==
The genus Acronychia was first formally described in 1775 by Johann Reinhold Forster and Georg Forster in their book Characteres Generum Plantarum. The first species they described, the type was Acronychia laevis.

Some species have common names including the word "aspen", a name also applied to some Northern Hemisphere plants in the genus Populus in the family Salicaceae.

=== Species list ===
The following is a list of species accepted by Plants of the World Online as at June 2020:

- Acronychia aberrans T.G.Hartley — acid berry, lemon aspen, plasticine tree (Qld.)
- Acronychia acidula F.Muell. — lemon aspen, lemon wood (Qld.)
- Acronychia acronychioides (F.Muell.) T.G.Hartley — white aspen (Qld.)
- Acronychia acuminata T.G.Hartley — Thornton aspen (Qld.)
- Acronychia arfakensis Gibbs — (New Guinea)
- Acronychia baeuerlenii T.G.Hartley — Byron Bay acronychia (Qld., N.S.W.)
- Acronychia brassii T.G.Hartley — (New Guinea)
- Acronychia carrii T.G.Hartley — (New Guinea)
- Acronychia cartilaginea T.G.Hartley — (New Guinea)
- Acronychia chooreechillum (F.M.Bailey) C.T.White — mountain aspen (Qld.)
- Acronychia crassipetala T.G.Hartley — crater aspen (Qld.)
- Acronychia cuspidata Lauterb. — (New Guinea)
- Acronychia cyminosma F.Muell. — (New Guinea)
- Acronychia dimorphocalyx T.G.Hartley — (New Guinea)
- Acronychia emarginata Lauterb. — (New Guinea)
- Acronychia eungellensis T.G.Hartley & B.Hyland — Eungella aspen (Qld.)
- Acronychia foveata T.G.Hartley — (New Guinea)
- Acronychia glauca T.G.Hartley — (New Guinea)
- Acronychia goniocarpa Merr. & L.M.Perry — (New Guinea)
- Acronychia gurakorensis T.G.Hartley — (New Guinea)
- Acronychia imperforata F.Muell. — Logan apple, Fraser Island apple, green tree (Qld., N.S.W.)
- Acronychia intermedia T.G.Hartley — (New Guinea)
- Acronychia kaidiensis T.G.Hartley — (New Guinea)
- Acronychia laevis J.R.Forst. & G.Forst. — hard aspen (Qld., N.S.W.)
- Acronychia ledermannii Lauterb. — (New Guinea)
- Acronychia littoralis T.G.Hartley & J.B.Williams — scented acronychia (Qld., N.S.W.)
- Acronychia macrocalyx T.G.Hartley — (New Guinea)
- Acronychia montana T.G.Hartley — (New Guinea)
- Acronychia murina Ridl. — (New Guinea)
- Acronychia normanbyensis T.G.Hartley — (New Guinea)
- Acronychia oblongifolia A.Cunn. ex Hook. — white aspen, yellow wood (Qld., N.S.W., Vic.)
- Acronychia octandra (F.Muell.) T.G.Hartley — doughwood, silver birch, soapwood (Qld., N.S.W.)
- Acronychia papuana Gibbs — (New Guinea)
- Acronychia parviflora C.T.White — (Qld.)
- Acronychia pauciflora C.T.White — (Qld., N.S.W.)
- Acronychia pedunculata (L.) Miq. — South and Southeast Asia
- Acronychia peninsularis T.G.Hartley — (Qld.)
- Acronychia pubescens (F.M.Bailey) C.T.White — (Qld., N.S.W.)
- Acronychia pullei Lauterb. — (New Guinea)
- Acronychia reticulata Lauterb. — (New Guinea)
- Acronychia richards-beehleri Takeuchi — (New Guinea)
- Acronychia rubescens Lauterb. — (New Guinea)
- Acronychia rugosa T.G.Hartley — (New Guinea)
- Acronychia schistacea T.G.Hartley — (New Guinea)
- Acronychia similaris T.G.Hartley — (New Guinea)
- Acronychia smithii T.G.Hartley — (New Guinea)
- Acronychia suberosa C.T.White — (Qld., N.S.W.)
- Acronychia trifoliolata Zoll. & Moritzi — (Christmas Island to the Solomon Islands)
- Acronychia vestita F.Muell. — (Qld.)
- Acronychia wabagensis T.G.Hartley — (New Guinea)
- Acronychia wilcoxiana (F.Muell.) T.G.Hartley — (Qld., N.S.W.)
- Acronychia wisseliana T.G.Hartley — (New Guinea)

== Uses ==
The best known species of Acronychia is probably A. acidula due to its promotion as a food plant.

=== Gallery ===
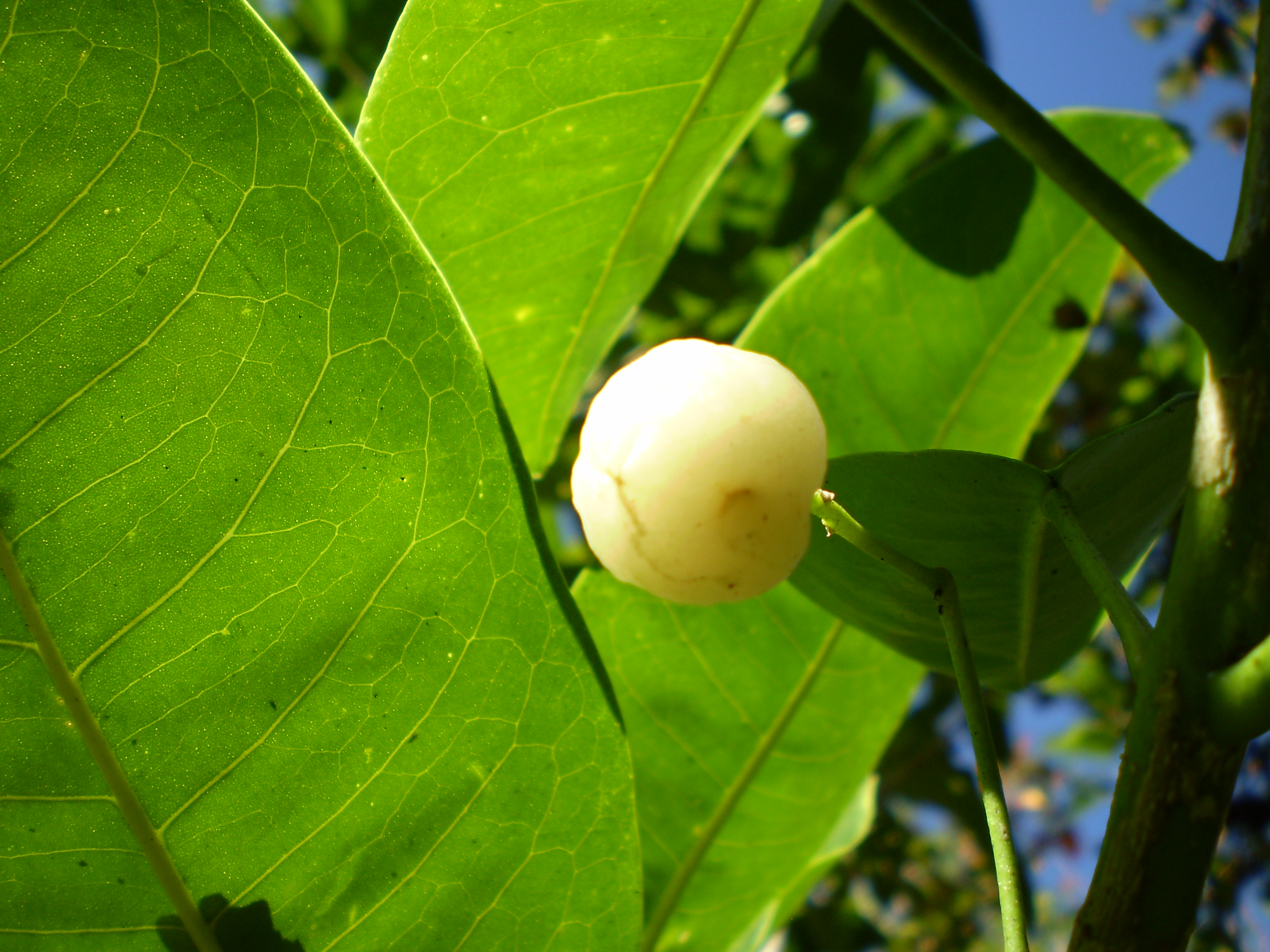
Acronychia acidula fruit

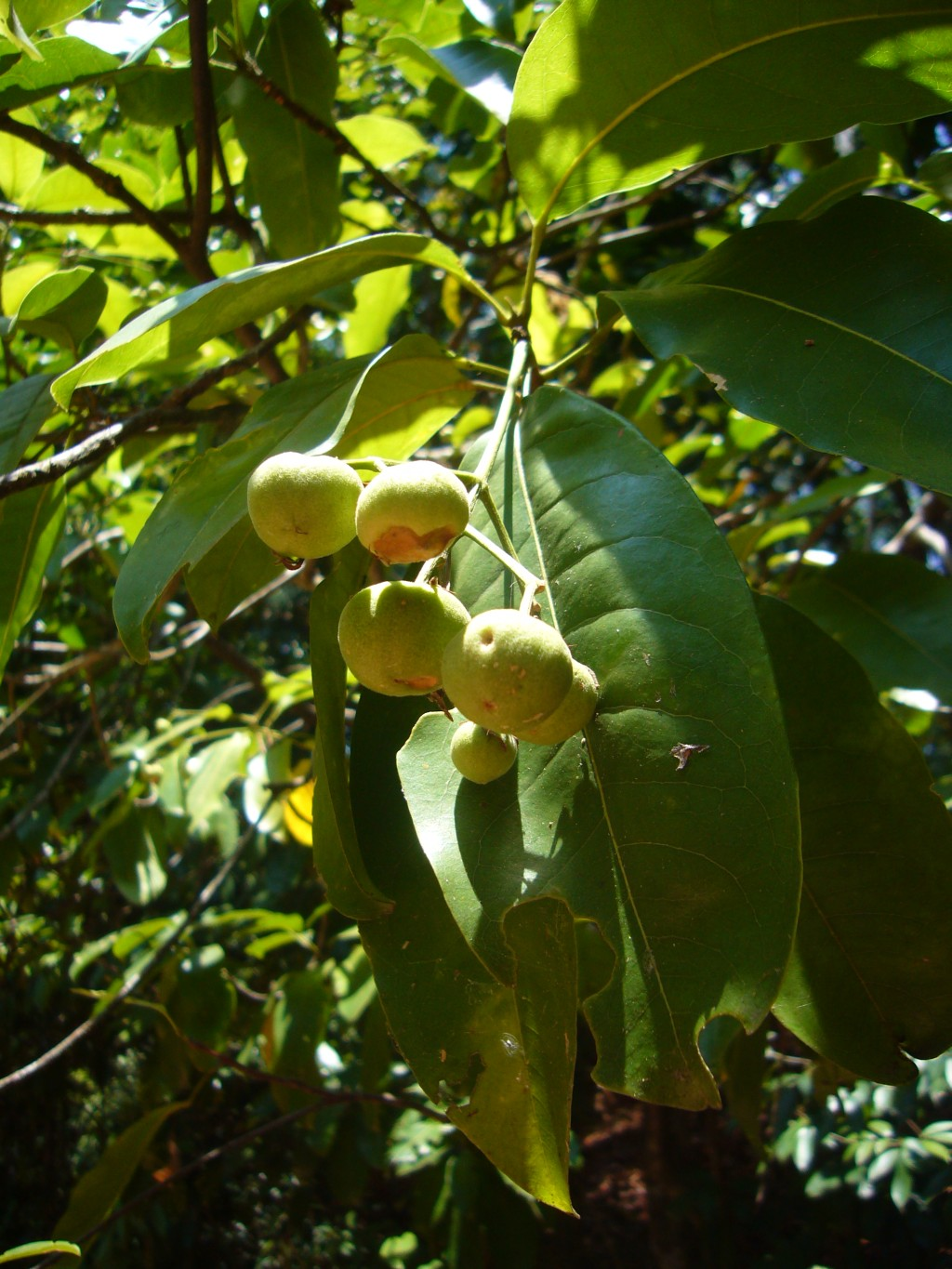
Acronychia pedunculata fruit

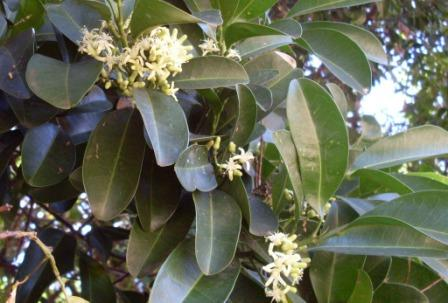
Scented acronychia
