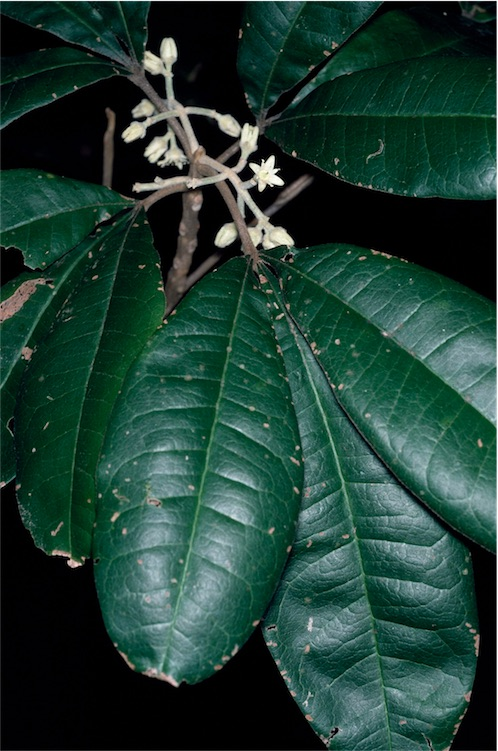
- Acronychia pubescens in Coffs Harbour

Scientific classification
- Kingdom: Plantae
- Clade: Tracheophytes
- Clade: Angiosperms
- Clade: Eudicots
- Clade: Rosids
- Order: Sapindales
- Family: Rutaceae
- Genus: Acronychia
- Species: A. pubescens

Binomial name
- Acronychia pubescens (F.M.Bailey) C.T.White

Synonyms
- Acronychia melicopoides var. lasiantha F.Muell.; Melicope pubescens F.M.Bailey; Melicope pubescens F.M.Bailey var. pubescens; Melicope pubescens var. superba Domin; Melicope pubescens var. typica Domin nom. inval.; Sarcomelicope pubescens C.T.White nom. inval., pro syn.

= Acronychia pubescens =

Hairy aspen

Species of flowering plant

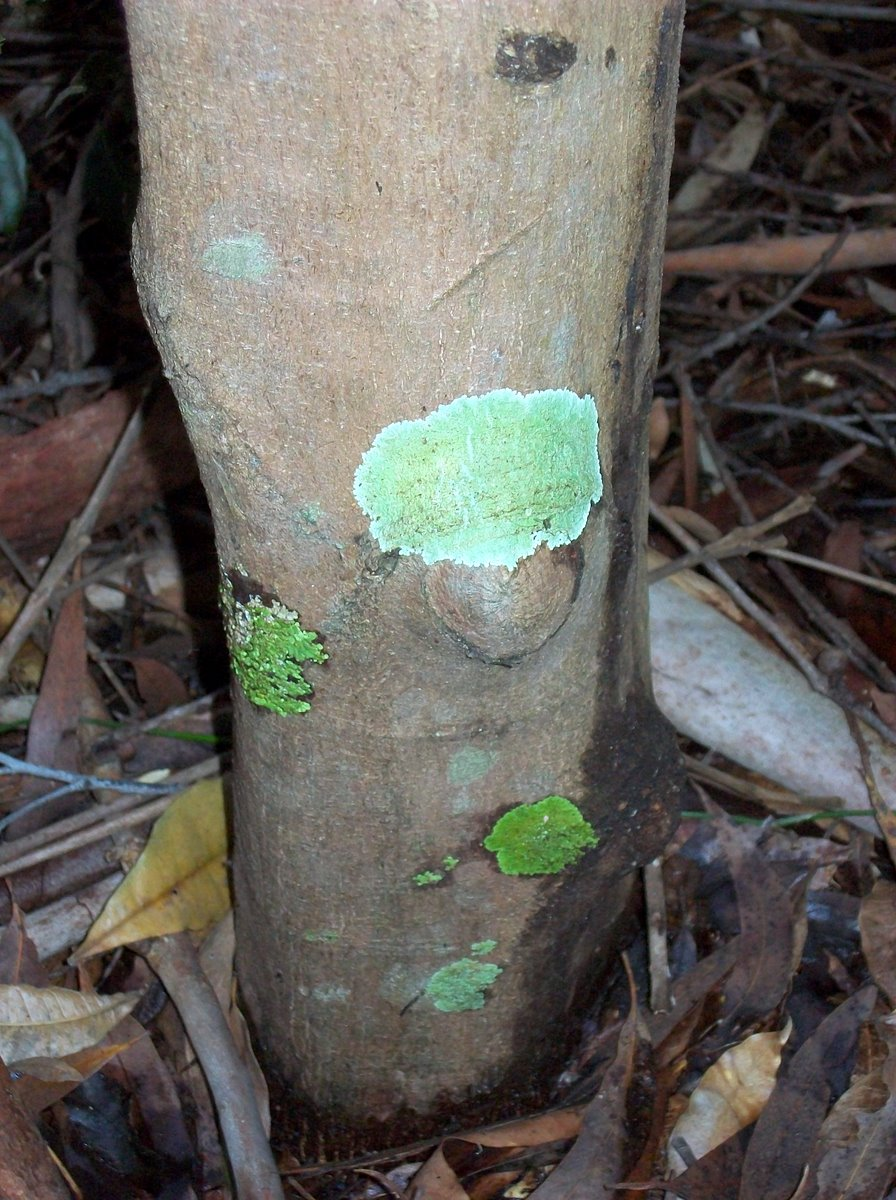
Trunk

Acronychia pubescens, commonly known as hairy acronychia or hairy aspen, is a species of tall shrub or small tree that is endemic to eastern Australia. It usually has trifoliate leaves, rarely simple leaves, groups of whitish flowers in leaf axils and creamy to yellowish, elliptical to spherical fruit.

== Description ==
Acronychia pubescens is a shrub or tree that typically grows to a height of 15 m (49 ft) with a stem diameter of 18 cm (7.1 in). The trunk is mostly cylindrical, occasionally with flanges at the base. The bark is greyish brown and relatively smooth, the small branchlets golden with downy hair. The leaves are arranged in opposite pairs, usually trifoliate, rarely only simple, the leaflets lance-shaped or elliptical to egg-shaped, 50–260 mm (2.0–10.2 in) long and 18–77 mm (0.71–3.03 in) wide on a petiole 8–85 mm (0.31–3.35 in) long, the leaflets on a petiolule up to 23 mm (0.91 in) long. The top surface of the leaflets is downy, particularly along the mid-rib, but the lower surface is hairier. The hairy leaves distinguish this species from other members of the genus.

The flowers are arranged in cymes 25–65 mm (0.98–2.56 in) long in leaf axils, each flower on a pedicel 1–4.5 mm (0.039–0.177 in) long. The four sepals are 1.5–2.5 mm (0.059–0.098 in) wide, the four petals greenish fawn, 6–9 mm (0.24–0.35 in) long and the eight stamens alternate in length. Flowering and fruiting occurs in most months and the fruit is a fleshy, hairy, ridged elliptical to spherical, creamy to yellowish drupe 12–18 mm (0.47–0.71 in) long that has an acid or turpentine flavour. The fruit contains up to three dark grey or black seeds 4–4.5 mm (0.16–0.18 in) long and resembling a miniature canoe.

== Taxonomy ==
Hairy acronychia was first described in 1891 by Frederick Manson Bailey who gave it the name Melicope pubescens and published the description in the Botany Bulletin of the Department of Agriculture, Queensland from a collection from the Blackall Range. It gained its current binomial name in 1939 when reclassified by his grandson, Queensland Government Botanist Cyril Tenison White, in the Proceedings of the Royal Society of Queensland. The specific epithet pubescens means hairy, referring to the downy leaves.

== Distribution and habitat ==
Acronychia pubescens ranges from Urunga in northern New South Wales to the Blackall Range in south eastern Queensland. The habitat is of several rainforest types, including subtropical rainforest on red/brown basaltic soils, littoral rainforest and riverine rainforest. It is most often seen in warm temperate rainforest at higher altitudes.

== Use in horticulture ==
Removal of the flesh from the seed is advised for regeneration. Around a half of the seeds may germinate in seven months. Cuttings may also be attempted. Acronychia pubescens requires good drainage, but benefits from extra water and fertiliser when grown in cultivation. Although its fruits are edible, their turpentine taste detracts somewhat from their palatability.
