= Acronychia aberrans =

Acid berry

Scientific classification
- Kingdom: Plantae
- Clade: Tracheophytes
- Clade: Angiosperms
- Clade: Eudicots
- Clade: Rosids
- Order: Sapindales
- Family: Rutaceae
- Genus: Acronychia
- Species: A. aberrans

Binomial name
- Acronychia aberrans T.G.Hartley

Species of flowering plant

Acronychia aberrans, commonly known as acid berry, lemon aspen, plasticine tree or plasticene aspen, is a species of medium-sized rainforest tree that is endemic to north-eastern Queensland. It has simple leaves on stems that are more or less square in cross-section, flowers in small groups in leaf axils and fleshy, more or less spherical fruit.

== Description ==
Acronychia aberrans is a tree that typically grows to a height of 10 m (33 ft). Its leafy stems are more or less square in cross-section, giving the appearance of having been squeezed like plasticine. The leaves are simple, elliptic to egg-shaped with the narrower end towards the base, 60–230 mm (2.4–9.1 in) long and 30–103 mm (1.2–4.1 in) wide on a petiole 15–55 mm (0.59–2.17 in) long. The flowers are arranged in small groups 30–40 mm (1.2–1.6 in) long in leaf axils, each flower on a pedicel 3–5 mm (0.12–0.20 in) long. The sepals are about 1.5 mm (0.059 in) wide, the four petals 7–9 mm (0.28–0.35 in) long and the eight stamens alternate in length. Flowering occurs from February to April and the fruit is a fleshy, more or less spherical or pear-shaped drupe 13–16 mm (0.51–0.63 in) long.

== Taxonomy ==
Acronychia aberrans was first formally described in 1974 by Thomas Gordon Hartley in the Journal of the Arnold Arboretum from specimens collected by Bernard Hyland on the Atherton Tableland. The specific epithet is a reference to the unusual shape of the branchlets.

== Distribution and habitat ==
This tree grows in rainforest between the Mount Spurgeon National Park and the Atherton Tableland, at altitudes from 720 to 100 m (2,360 to 330 ft).

== Conservation status ==
Acid berry is classified as of "least concern" under the Queensland Government Nature Conservation Act 1992.
