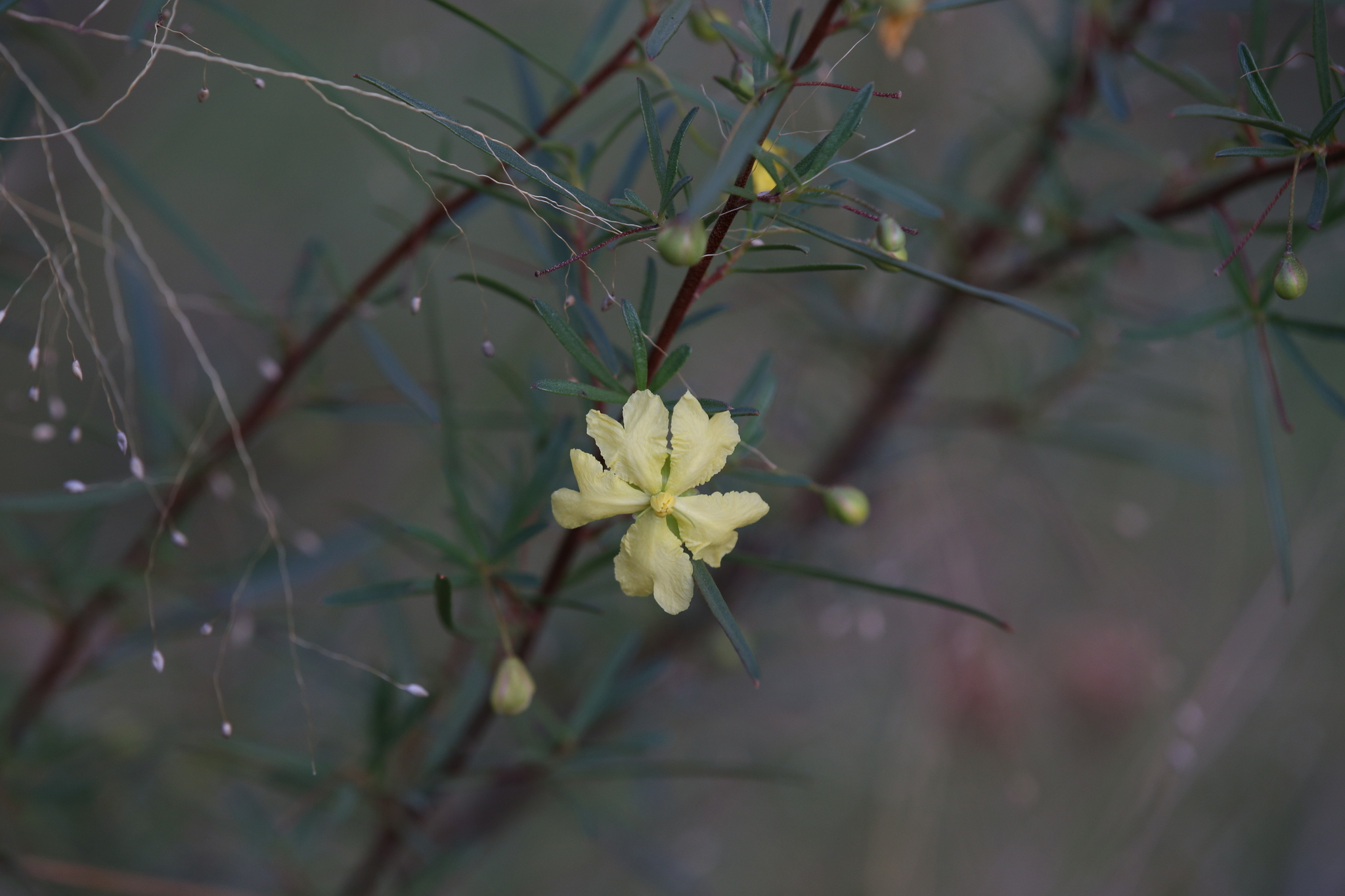

Scientific classification
- Kingdom: Plantae
- Clade: Tracheophytes
- Clade: Angiosperms
- Clade: Eudicots
- Order: Dilleniales
- Family: Dilleniaceae
- Genus: Hibbertia
- Species: H. stirlingii

Binomial name
- Hibbertia stirlingii C.T.White

= Hibbertia stirlingii =

Species of flowering plant

Hibbertia stirlingii is a species of flowering plant in the family Dilleniaceae and is endemic to far northern Queensland. It is a small shrub with linear leaves and yellow flowers arranged singly near the ends of branches, with ten to twelve stamens arranged in bundles around two densely scaly carpels.

== Description ==
Hibbertia stirlingii is a shrub that typically grows to a height of up to 60 cm (24 in) and has stiffly woody main stems and scaly foliage. The leaves are linear, mostly 7.5–19 mm (0.30–0.75 in) long and 1.2–2.0 mm (0.047–0.079 in) wide on a petiole 0.4–1.5 mm (0.016–0.059 in) long. The flowers are arranged at the end of branches or in leaf axils, each flower on a thread-like peduncle 12–19 mm (0.47–0.75 in) long, with linear to lance-shaped bracts at the base. The five sepals are joined at the base, the two outer sepal lobes 2.4–3.3 mm (0.094–0.130 in) long and 2.2–3.0 mm (0.087–0.118 in) wide, and the inner lobes 4.2–5.7 mm (0.17–0.22 in) long and 4.1–5.2 mm (0.16–0.20 in) wide. The five petals are egg-shaped with the narrower end towards the base, yellow, 7.2–9.6 mm (0.28–0.38 in) long and there are ten to twelve stamens arranged in groups around the two densely scaly carpels, each carpel with two ovules. Flowering occurs from January to June

== Taxonomy ==
Hibbertia stirlingii was first formally described in 1936 by Cyril Tenison White in the Proceedings of the Royal Society of Queensland from specimens collected by James Stirling near Herberton in 1904.

== Distribution and habitat ==
This hibbertia grows on coarse, sandy soil in woodland or forest in far north Queensland.

== Conservation status ==
Hibbertia stirlingii is classified as of "least concern" under the Queensland Government Nature Conservation Act 1992.

== See also ==
- List of Hibbertia species
