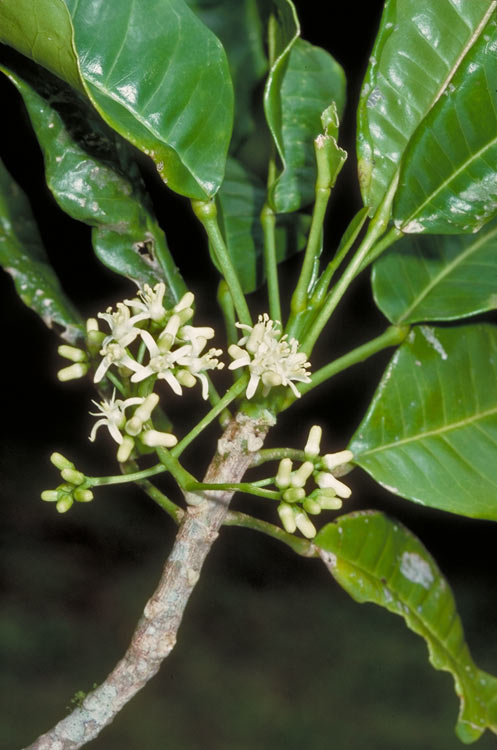

Scientific classification
- Kingdom: Plantae
- Clade: Tracheophytes
- Clade: Angiosperms
- Clade: Eudicots
- Clade: Rosids
- Order: Sapindales
- Family: Rutaceae
- Genus: Acronychia
- Species: A. acidula

Binomial name
- Acronychia acidula F. Muell.

Synonyms
- Acronychia superba Domin; Jambolifera acidula (F.Muell.)Kuntze

= Acronychia acidula =

Lemon aspen

Species of tree

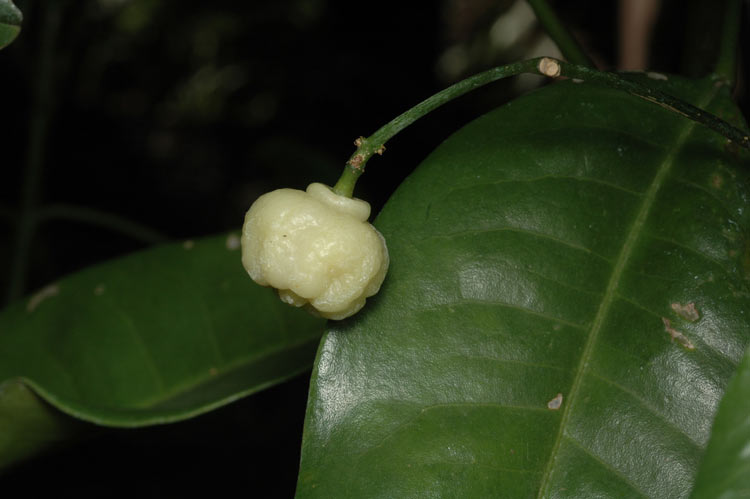
Fruit

Acronychia acidula, commonly known as lemon aspen or lemon wood, is a species of small to medium-sized rainforest tree that is endemic to Queensland. It has simple, elliptical leaves, small groups of flowers in leaf axils and more or less spherical fruit. The aromatic and acidic fruit is harvested as a bushfood.

== Description ==
Acronychia acidula is a tree that typically grows to a height of about 27 m (89 ft). It has simple, elliptical, glabrous leaves that are 80–235 mm (3.1–9.3 in) long and 43–120 mm (1.7–4.7 in) wide on a petiole 20–70 mm (0.8–3 in) long. The crushed leaves often have an odour resembling that of mango (Mangifera indica). The flowers are arranged in groups 30–100 mm (1.2–3.9 in) long, in leaf axils or between the leaves, each flower on a glabrous pedicel 2–4 mm (0.08–0.2 in) long. The four sepals are 2–2.5 mm (0.08–0.1 in) long and the four petals 7–8.5 mm (0.28–0.33 in) long. The eight stamens alternate in length. The fruit is a fleshy, more or less spherical drupe 13–16 mm (0.5–0.6 in) long and the seeds are about 4.5 mm (0.2 in) long.

== Taxonomy ==
Acronychia acidula was first formally described in 1864 by Victorian state botanist Ferdinand von Mueller in Fragmenta phytographiae Australiae from specimens collected by John Dallachy in the Seaview Range near Rockingham Bay. Its species name acidula is Latin for 'slightly acid'.

== Distribution and habitat ==
Lemon aspen grows in rainforest at altitudes of up to 1,000 m (3,300 ft) from the Atherton Tableland to the Eungella Range in Queensland.

== Ecology ==
The fruit are eaten by the topknot pigeon (Lopholaimus antarcticus).

== Uses ==
Lemon aspen fruit has a grapefruit and lime-like flavor, and is popular in beverages, sauces and confectionery. The fruit has high antioxidant activity.

== Cultivation ==
The tree is grown in small-scale commercial bushfood orchards on the east coast of Australia from North Queensland to northern New South Wales. The tree is quick-growing and requires regular pruning to maintain a practical harvesting height. It has a moderate crop yield, and bears in four years from seedlings. It prefers well-drained and fertile clay loam soils, with a sunny aspect and extra moisture when young.

== Cultural references ==
Lemon aspen featured on an Australian postage stamp in 2019.
