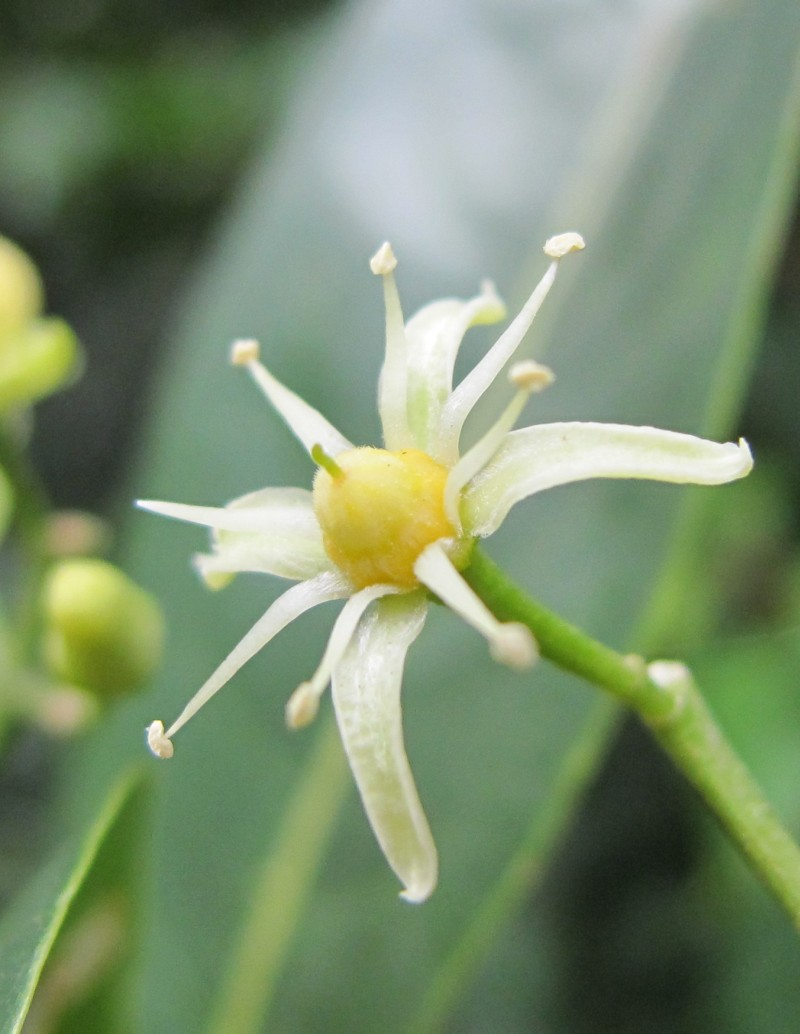
- At Udawattakele, Kandy, Sri Lanka

Conservation status
- Least Concern (IUCN 3.1)

Scientific classification
- Kingdom: Plantae
- Clade: Tracheophytes
- Clade: Angiosperms
- Clade: Eudicots
- Clade: Rosids
- Order: Sapindales
- Family: Rutaceae
- Genus: Acronychia
- Species: A. pedunculata

Binomial name
- Acronychia pedunculata (L.) Miq.

Synonyms
- Jambolifera pedunculata L.; Acronychia arborea Blume; Acronychia laurifolia Blume

= Acronychia pedunculata =

Species of flowering plant

Acronychia pedunculata is a large shrub or small tree of the understory, gaps and fringes of low country and lower hill tropical forests of tropical Asia.

== Description ==
Leaves: elliptic to suboblong, often with tapered base. Twigs more or less angular, glabrous. Flowers: greenish white; I-acillary, corymbose panicles, about 14 mm (0.6 in) across in inflorescences of 4–24 cm (2–9 in) wide. Flowering: February–April, July–August. The fruits are cream to brownish yellow drupes, slightly angled, 0.5–1.5 cm (0.2–0.6 in) in diameter with a short apiculate tip. Leaves and fruits, and other parts of the plant, contain aromatic oils with a resinous scent. In Sri Lanka, the flowering time is February–April and July–August.

== Distribution ==
South and Southeast Asia from India & Sri Lanka to South China & Taiwan, Indochina, Malesia & Papua New Guinea.

== Local names ==
- Sinhala: අංකෙන්ද, romanized: Ankenda
- Chinese: 降真香; pinyin: Jiangzhenxiang
- Nepali: Paolay
- Assamese: Laojan
- Tamil & Malayalam: Mutta-nari

== Uses ==
Extracts of its leaves, bark, stems and fruits are widely used in herbal medicinal applications against sores, scabies and intestinal infections, due to their antifungal and antimicrobial properties. Contains aromatic, essential oils, which are used in China for making perfumes. The ripe fruit is edible and has a sweet acidic flavor. Unripe fruits have a strongly astringent, resinous taste. The roots are used as a fish-poison in southern Vietnam. In India the wood is used for carving, poles, house construction and making the charcoal preferred by goldsmiths. And the tender leaves are used in salads and as a condiment.

Its wood, called lakawood (a term covering a few different plants), is also used in incense production. It is particularly favoured by Taoist practitioners who are forbidden from using sandalwood.

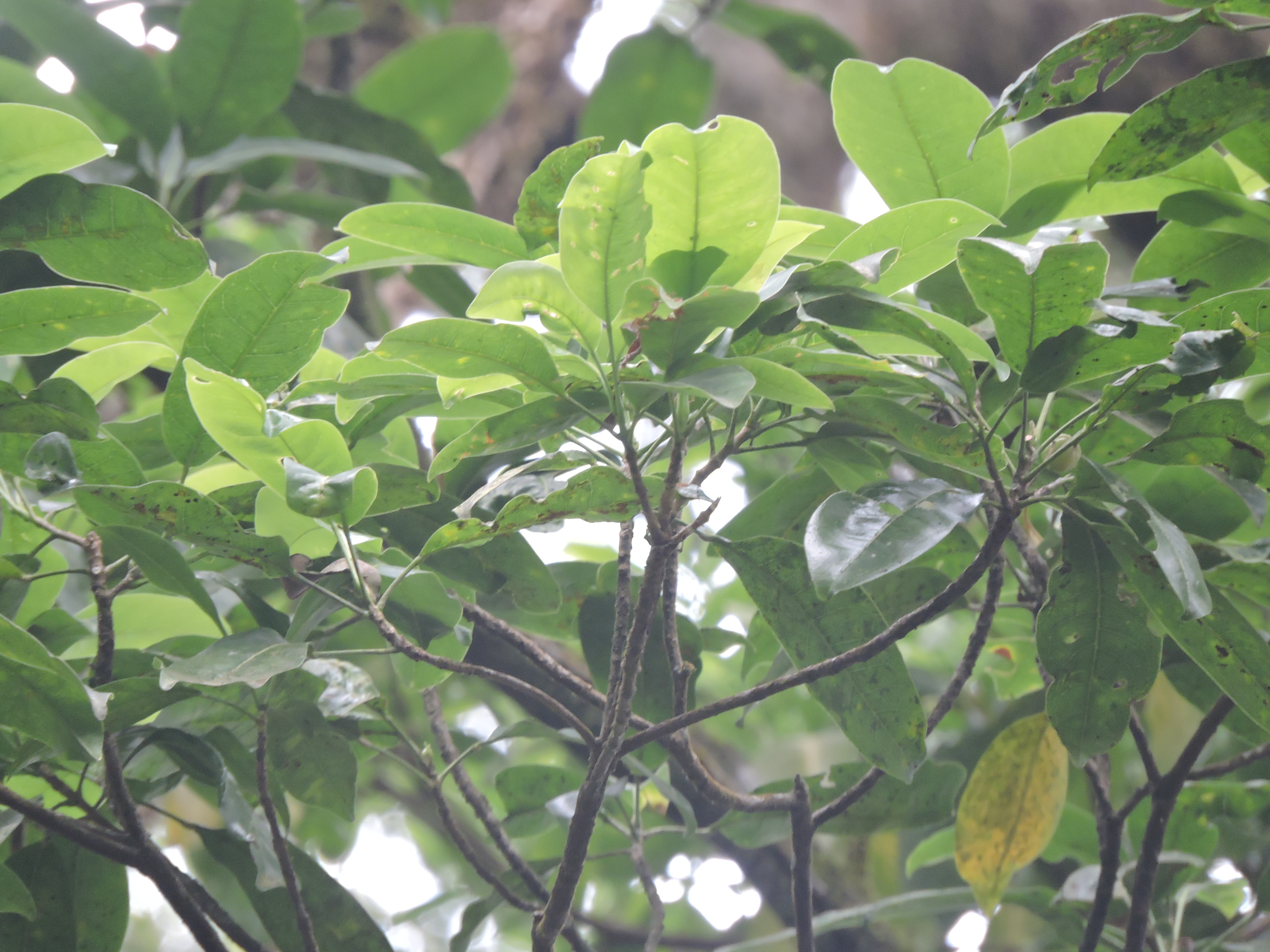
Leaves of Acronychia pedunculata from Mankulam forest, Kerala

According to a paper by a scholar at the University of Athens (July 2012), the acrovestone (molecular weight 554.67 g/mole) contained in Acronychia pedunculata has significant cytotoxicity to prostate cancer and melanoma cells.
