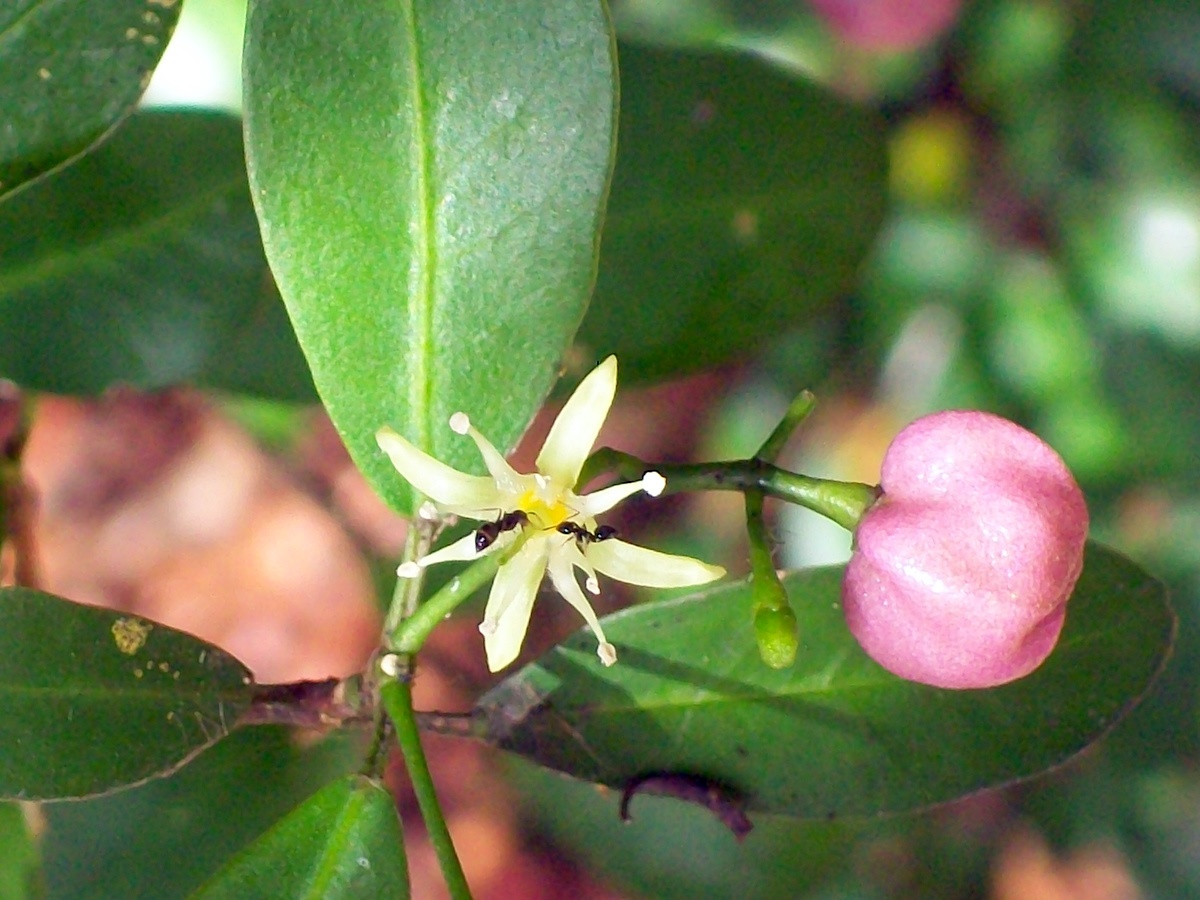
- Leaves, flower and fruit of Acronychia laevis

Conservation status
- Least Concern (IUCN 3.1)

Scientific classification
- Kingdom: Plantae
- Clade: Embryophytes
- Clade: Tracheophytes
- Clade: Angiosperms
- Clade: Eudicots
- Clade: Rosids
- Order: Sapindales
- Family: Rutaceae
- Genus: Acronychia
- Species: A. laevis

Binomial name
- Acronychia laevis J.R.Forst. & G.Forst.

Synonyms
- Acronychia laevis J.R.Forst. & G.Forst. var. laevis; Acronychia laevis var. longiflora Domin; Acronychia laevis var. normalis F.M.Bailey nom. inval.; Acronychia laevis var. purpurea F.M.Bailey; Jambolifera laevis (J.R.Forst. & G.Forst.) Kuntze

= Acronychia laevis =

Hard aspen

Species of flowering plant

Acronychia laevis, commonly known as hard aspen, glossy acronychia or northern white lilly pilly, is a species of shrub or small tree in the citrus family. It is native to eastern Australia (Queensland and New South Wales) Lord Howe Island, and New Caledonia. It has simple, elliptical to egg-shaped leaves, groups of creamy white flowers and fleshy, mitre-shaped to spherical fruit.

== Description ==
Acronychia laevis is a shrub or small tree that typically grows to a height of 12 m (39 ft). The trunk has fairly smooth, fawn bark with some vertical lines and wrinkles. The leaves are arranged in opposite pairs and are simple, elliptic to egg-shaped with the narrower end towards the base, 25–100 mm (0.98–3.94 in) long and 10–50 mm (0.39–1.97 in) wide on a petiole 3–30 mm (0.12–1.18 in) long. The leaves are shiny green on both sides with a blunt or rounded tip and have oil dots that may be seen using a lens and a bright light. The flowers are mainly arranged in leaf axils in cymes 15–70 mm (0.59–2.76 in) long, each flower on a pedicel 3.5–13 mm (0.14–0.51 in) long. The four sepals are 0.5–1.5 mm (0.020–0.059 in) wide, the four petals creamy white and 5–9 mm (0.20–0.35 in) long and the eight stamens alternate in length. Flowering occurs from February to June and the fruit is a fleshy mitre-shaped to more or less spherical, dark pink drupe 7–10 mm (0.28–0.39 in) long containing reddish-brown seeds about 4 mm (0.16 in) long.

== Taxonomy ==
Acronychia laevis was first described in 1775 by German naturalists Johann Reinhold Forster and Georg Forster who published the description in their book Characteres Generum Plantarum. The specific epithet laevis is the Latin adjective "smooth", and refers to the new shoots and leaves.

== Distribution and habitat ==
Hard aspen grows in dry rainforest and subtropical rainforest from sea level to an altitude of 1,100 m (3,600 ft). It is found from the upper Clarence River, New South Wales in New South Wales to Cape York Peninsula in Queensland, on New Caledonia and on Lord Howe Island.

== Ecology ==
The fruit is eaten by the green catbird.

== Use in horticulture ==
Acronychia laevis can be grown in a sunny or part-shaded position in a garden. Its attractive fruit and flowers have horticultural appeal. It can be propagated from seed, although cuttings may also be attempted. The fruit is edible to humans, although described as too pungent to be palatable, and have even been likened to turpentine.
