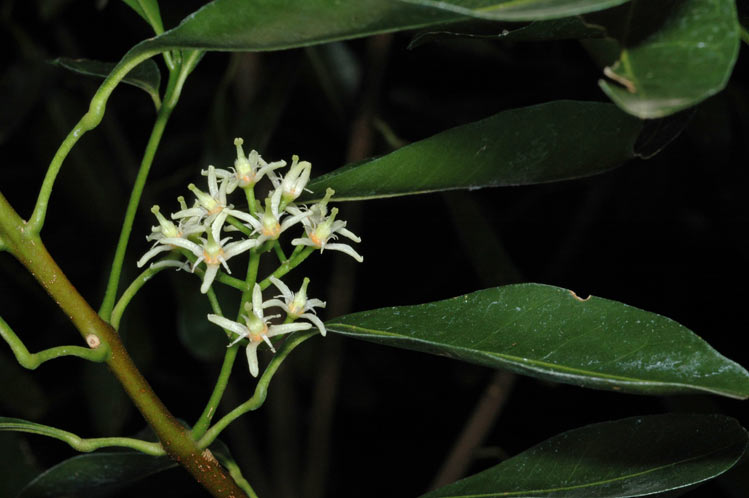
- In the ANBG

Scientific classification
- Kingdom: Plantae
- Clade: Tracheophytes
- Clade: Angiosperms
- Clade: Eudicots
- Clade: Rosids
- Order: Sapindales
- Family: Rutaceae
- Genus: Acronychia
- Species: A. oblongifolia

Binomial name
- Acronychia oblongifolia (A. Cunn. ex Hook.) Endl. ex Heynh.

Synonyms
- Acronychia laevis var. dictyophleba Domin; Acronychia laevis var. leucocarpa F.M.Bailey; Acronychia laurina F.Muell. nom. illeg., nom. superfl.; Cyminosma oblongifolia A.Cunn. ex Hook; Eriostemon oblongifolius (A.Cunn. & Hook.) G.Don; Jambolifera oblongifolia (A.Cunn. ex Hook.) Steud.; Acronychia laevis auct. non J.R.Forst. & G.Forst.

= Acronychia oblongifolia =

White aspen

Species of tree

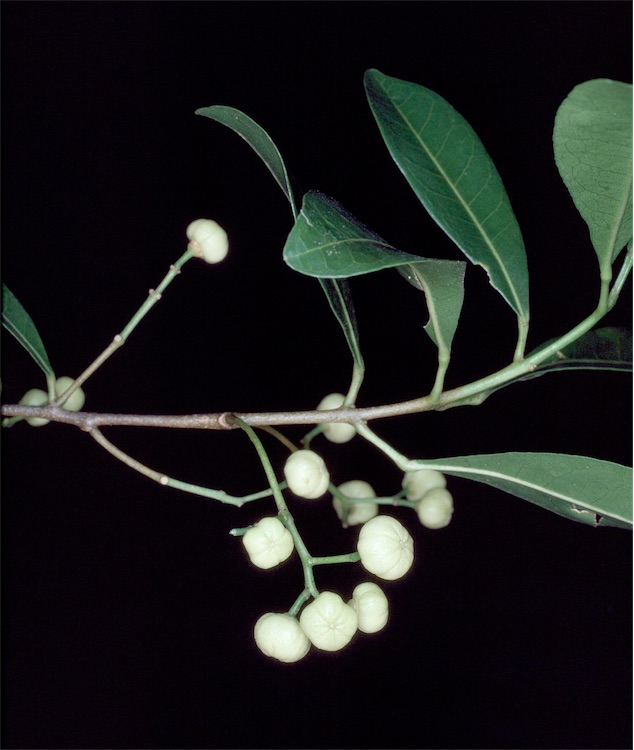
Fruit

Acronychia oblongifolia, commonly known as white aspen or yellow wood, is a species of shrub to medium-sized rainforest tree of the citrus family, Rutaceae, and is endemic to eastern Australia. It has mostly simple, egg-shaped leaves with the narrower end towards the base, small groups of creamy-white flowers and fleshy, more or less spherical, edible fruit.

== Description ==
Acronychia oblongifolia grows as a shrub or medium-sized tree sometimes to 27 m (89 ft) high. The trunk is dark brown and generally smooth, sometimes with fine wrinkles, fissures or pustules. The leaves are mostly simple, arranged in opposite pairs, lance-shaped to egg-shaped with the narrower end towards the base, 30–120 mm (1.2–4.7 in) long and 14–50 mm (0.6–2 in) wide on a petiole 5–32 mm (0.2–1 in) long. The leaves are leathery, dark green, aromatic and sometimes trifoliate. The flowers are creamy-white and arranged in small groups 20–60 mm (0.8–2 in) long, usually in leaf axils, each flower about 10 mm (0.4 in) wide on a pedicel 1.5–8 mm (0.06–0.3 in) long. The four sepals are 0.9–1.5 mm (0.04–0.06 in) wide, the four petals 4.5–7 mm (0.2–0.3 in) long and there are eight stamens that alternate in length. Flowering occurs from February to June and the fruit is a fleshy, white, yellow or purplish, more or less spherical drupe 5–9 mm (0.2–0.4 in) long, that matures from May to December. The fruit are four-lobed and have a tuft of hairs on the end.

== Taxonomy ==
The white aspen was first formally described in 1934 by William Jackson Hooker in The Botanical Magazine from an unpublished description by Allan Cunningham. Cunningham gave it the name Cyminosma oblongifolia. In 1840, Stephan Endlicher proposed changing the name to Acronychia oblongifolia and the change was published by the German botanist Gustav Heynhold in his book Alphabetische und Synonymische Aufzahlung der in der Jahren 1840 bis 1846 in den europäischen Gärten eingeführten Gewächse nebst Angabe ihres Autors. The specific name, from the Latin folium 'leaf', refers to the oblong shape of the leaves.

== Distribution and habitat ==
White aspen is found from near Gympie in central-eastern Queensland, south through eastern New South Wales to a few rainforest communities in eastern Victoria. Its natural habitat is rainforest and rainforest margin. Mostly shrubby, the places where Acronychia oblongifolia reaches tree size include the rainforest of the McPherson Range on the New South Wales/Queensland border, and the Mitchell River Gorge in Victoria.

== Ecology ==
The fruit are ripe between May and November (to January in Victoria) and are consumed by the green catbird, regent bowerbird, satin bowerbird, pied currawong, topknot pigeon, white-headed pigeon, blue-faced honeyeater and wompoo fruit dove.

== Uses ==
=== Use in horticulture ===
Acronychia oblongifolia is fairly readily cultivated in a well-drained soil with a sunny aspect, and benefits from extra water and fertiliser. It is somewhat frost tender when young. It is propagated by seed or cutting.

=== Use in food ===
Reported to have an aromatic lemon/orange flavour, the berries can be served with salads and side dishes or served cooked with seafood or poultry. They can also be used in preserves, sauces, juices and cocktails.
