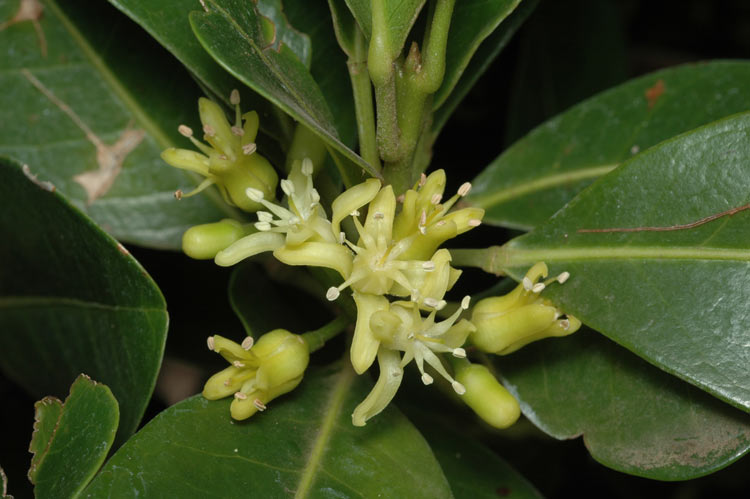
- Acronychia imperforata in the ANBG

Scientific classification
- Kingdom: Plantae
- Clade: Tracheophytes
- Clade: Angiosperms
- Clade: Eudicots
- Clade: Rosids
- Order: Sapindales
- Family: Rutaceae
- Genus: Acronychia
- Species: A. imperforata

Binomial name
- Acronychia imperforata F.Muell.

= Acronychia imperforata =

Logan apple

Species of flowering plant

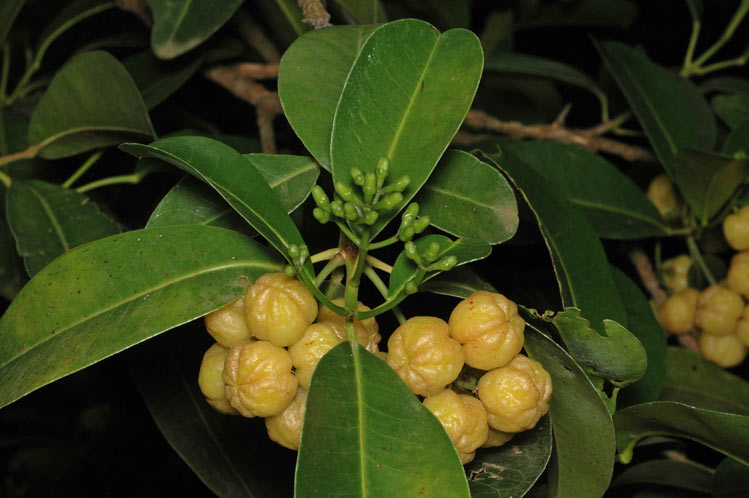
Fruit

Acronychia imperforata, commonly known as Logan apple, Fraser Island apple, or green tree, is a species of rainforest shrub or small tree that is endemic to north-eastern Australia. It has simple, elliptical to egg-shaped leaves, small groups of yellowish or creamy white flowers and fleshy spherical to oval fruit.

== Description ==
Acronychia imperforata is a shrub or tree that typically grows to a height of 9–10 m (30–33 ft). Its leaves are arranged in opposite pairs, simple, more or less glabrous and elliptical to egg-shaped with the narrower end towards the base, 33–133 mm (1.3–5.2 in) long and 16–60 mm (0.63–2.36 in) wide on a petiole 3–25 mm (0.12–0.98 in) long. The flowers are yellowish or creamy white and arranged in leaf axils in small cymes 20–50 mm (0.79–1.97 in) long, each flower on a pedicel 1.5–4.5 mm (0.059–0.177 in) long. The four sepals are 1.5–2.5 mm (0.059–0.098 in) wide and the four petals 5.5–9 mm (0.22–0.35 in) long and there are eight stamens that alternate in length. Flowering occurs in most months and the fruit is a fleshy, yellowish, pear-shaped to more or less spherical drupe 9–16 mm (0.35–0.63 in) long containing seeds 4–6 mm (0.16–0.24 in) long.

== Taxonomy ==
Acronychia imperforata was first formally described in 1858 by Ferdinand von Mueller in Fragmenta phytographiae Australiae.

== Distribution and habitat ==
Logan apple grows in rainforest in near-coastal areas between Somerset on Cape York in north-eastern Queensland and Seal Rocks in New South Wales.

== Conservation status ==
This acronychia is classified as of "least concern" under the Queensland Government Nature Conservation Act 1992.
