= North Coast Regional Botanic Garden =

Botanic garden in Coffs Harbour, Australia

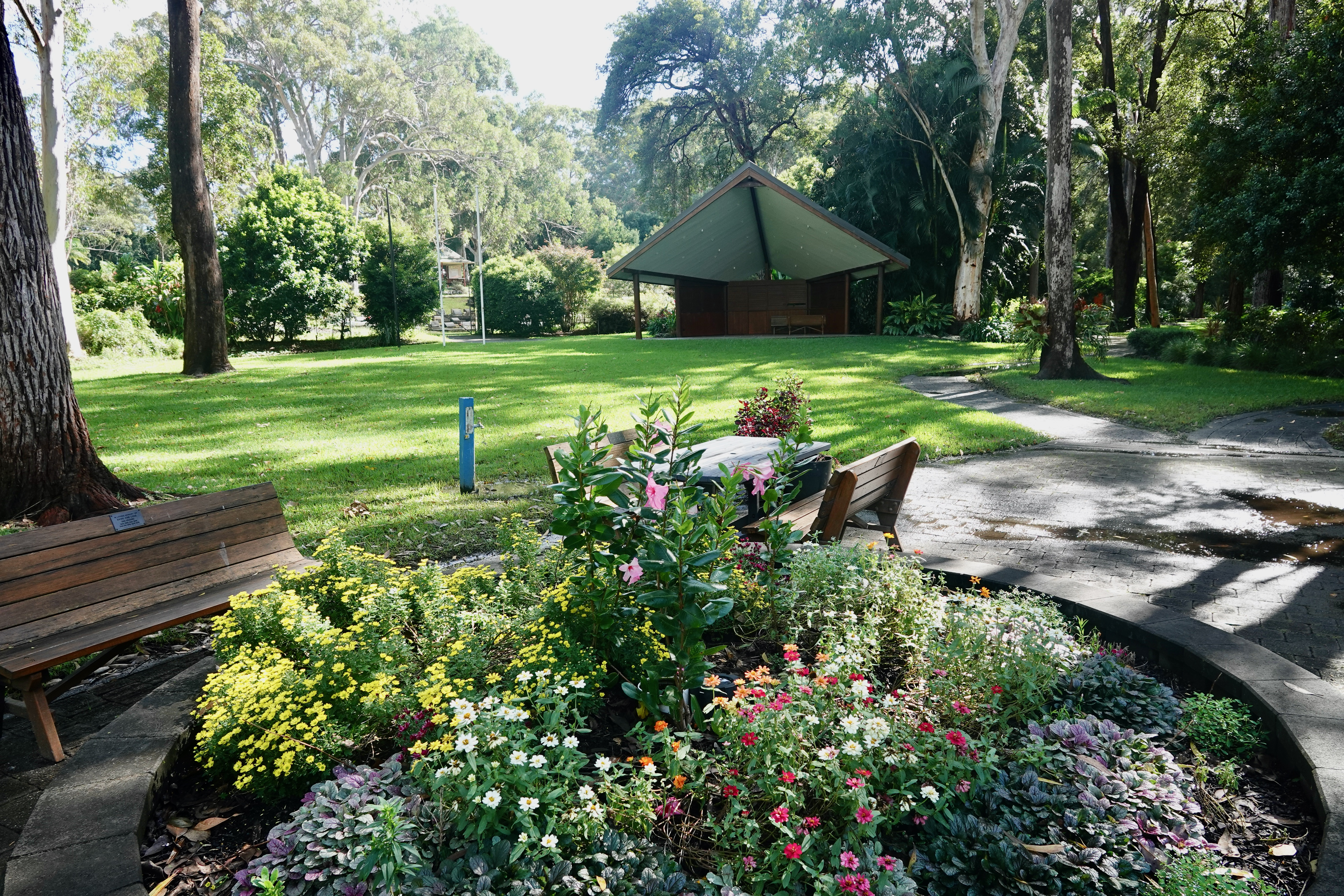
- Lawn and pavilion by the dining tables at the entrance to the botanic garden
- Interactive map of North Coast Regional Botanic Garden
- Type: Botanical garden
- Location: Coffs Harbour, New South Wales, Australia
- Coordinates: 30°17′39″S 153°07′30″E
- Area: 20 ha (0.20 km^{2})
- Established: 1988
- Website: coffsbotanicgarden.com.au

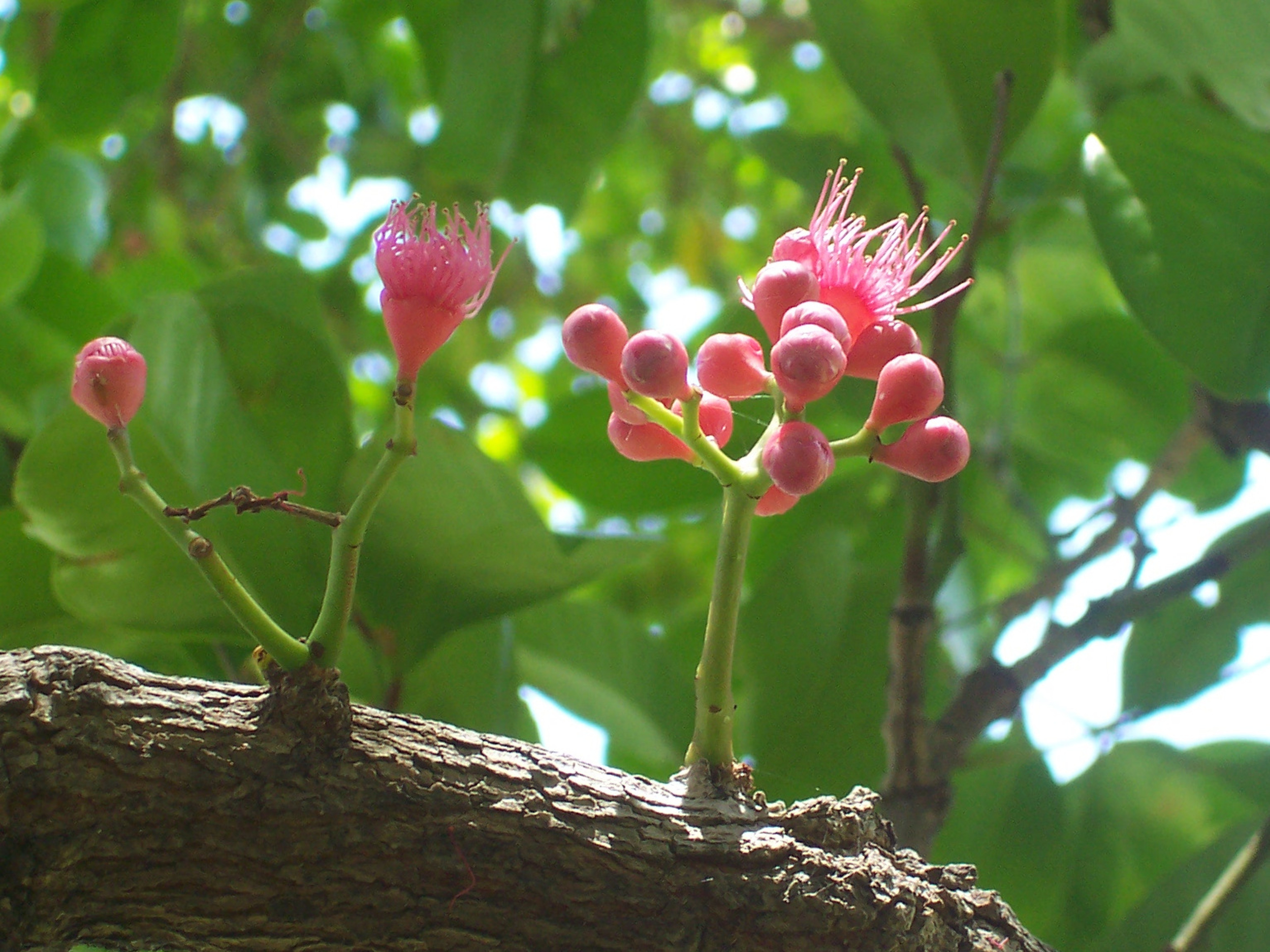
Watermelon tree in flower, a rare North Coast rainforest tree

The North Coast Regional Botanic Garden in Coffs Harbour is a 20-hectare (49-acre) oasis in the heart of Coffs Harbour, in the Mid North Coast region of New South Wales, Australia, blending a mix of natural coastal forests, planted gardens, discovery walks and picnic areas. It is located just one km from the Coffs Harbour central business district.

The gardens are open from 9 am to 5 pm every day of the year. Entry is free.

== Features ==
=== Entrance gardens (Prime Display Area) ===
At the entrance is a miniature botanic garden, covering about 1 hectare, showcasing the variety of plantings in the garden.

=== Natural forest and mangroves ===
Covering about half of the total garden area, the native forests and mangroves represents the original native vegetation of the area.

=== Rare and endangered ===
The North Coast Region of New South Wales contains 17 of the 20 most endangered plant species in New South Wales. The North Coast Regional Botanic Garden aims to provide a safe area to help ensure the survival of these endangered plants. The garden has a specimen of the endemic swamp orchid (Phaius australis), one of the most endangered plant species in New South Wales.

=== Sensory Garden ===
Located next to the rare and endangered area of the garden, the Sensory Garden contains a variety of aromatic plants.

=== New glasshouse ===
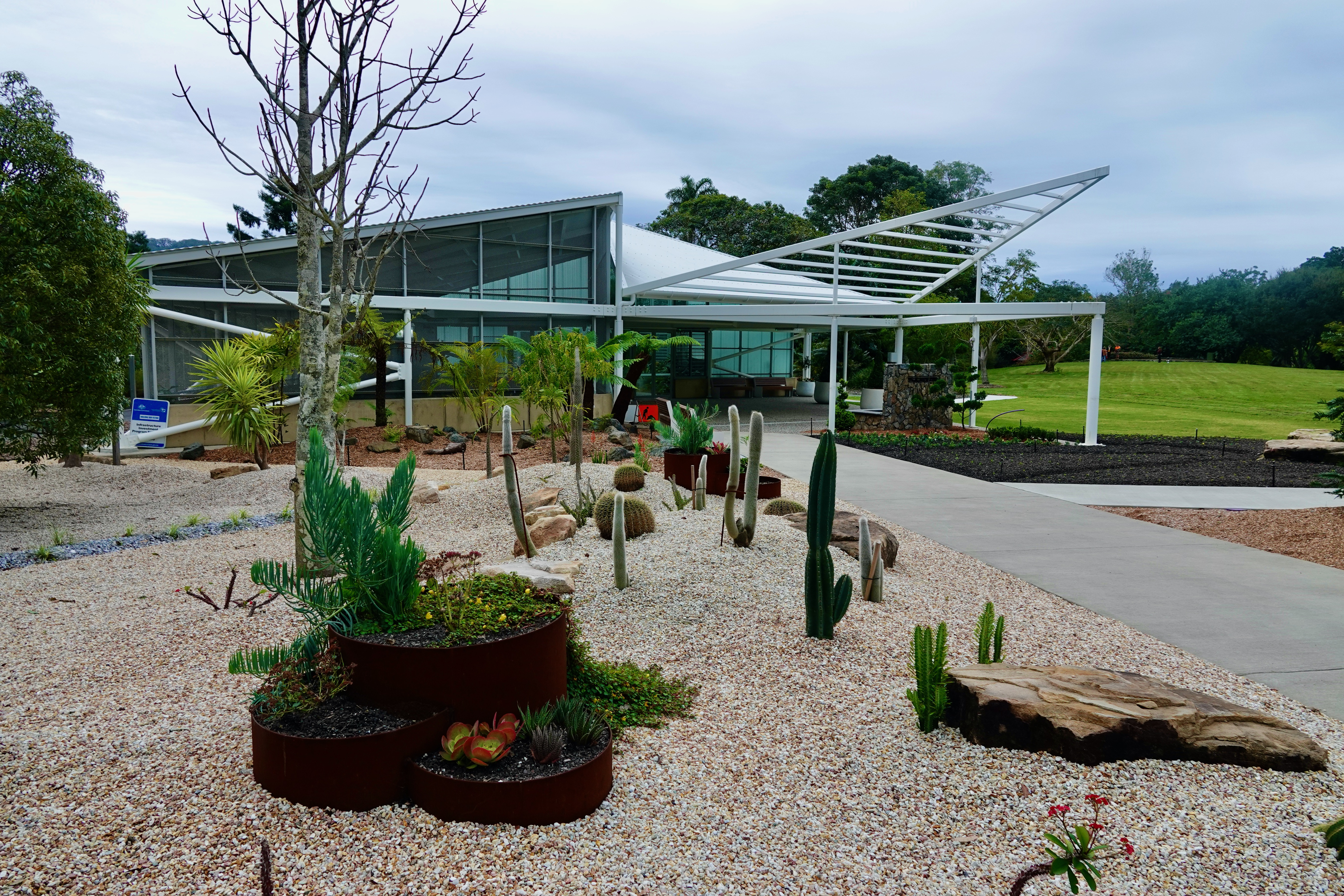
The new glasshouse in the North Coast Regional Botanic Garden

Opened in June 2022, the new glasshouse has a tropical house, kept at around 32 °C, for plants from tropical climates and a shade house for ferns and other shade-loving plants. The glasshouse has a wide variety of orchids, bromeliads, ferns, anthuriums, taro and other plants.

=== Eastern Australian native flora ===
The Eastern Australian native flora comprises plants from areas with a climate similar to that of Coffs Harbour. These are mostly from the North Coast heathland, coastal areas of New South Wales and sections of Queensland with a climate similar to Coffs Harbour's.

=== Exotic collection ===
The exotic collection contains plants from overseas locations with a climate similar to that of Coffs Harbour, mostly regions approximately 30 degrees north or south of the equator.

=== Rainforest ===
The rainforest area was planted in 1987 and contains about 350 species.

=== Japanese Friendship Garden ===
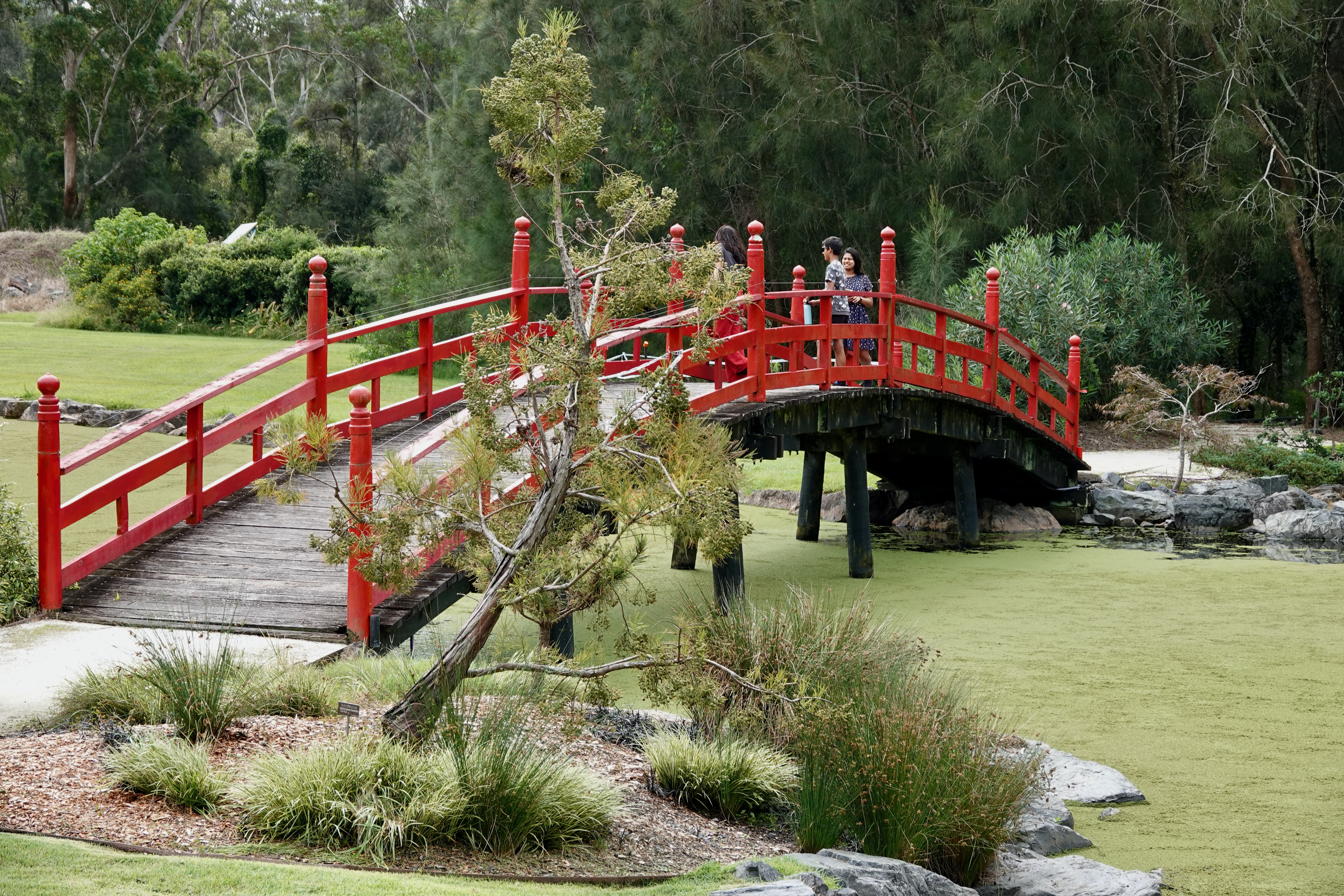
Red bridge over the lake at the Japanese Friendship Garden

The Japanese Friendship Gardenn was constructed with advice from gardeners from the botanic gardens in Sasebo, Coffs Harbour's sister city in Japan.

== Facilities ==
Picnic areas, sensory gardens, toilets, glasshouses and wheelchair access.

The Leaf & Bean Cafe is open from 9 am to 3 pm, seven days a week. Picnic baskets and catering options are available.

The gardens have tranquil grassy areas and garden beds of plants from many parts of the world. A special feature is the plantings of rare rainforest trees from northern New South Wales.

== See also ==
- List of botanical gardens
