= Cyril Tenison White =

Australian botanist (1890–1950)

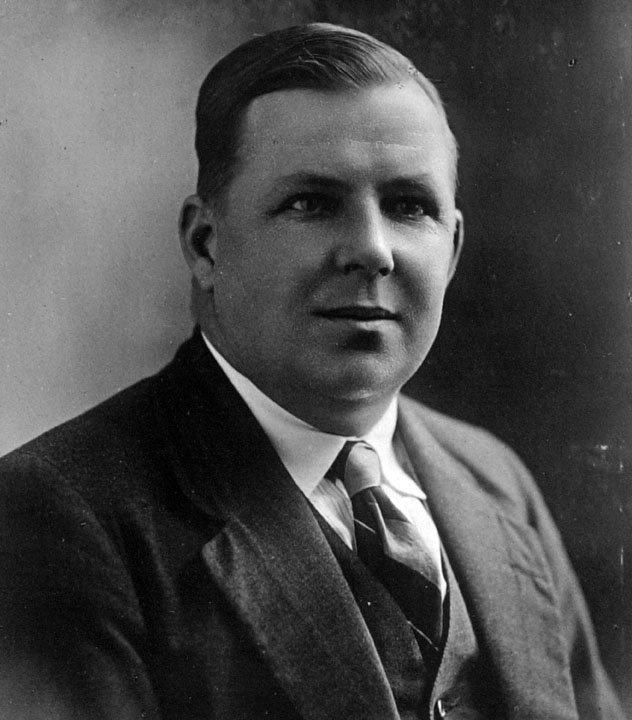
- White in c. 1925
- Born: 17 August 1890; Brisbane, Queensland, Australia
- Died: 16 August 1950 (aged 59); Kangaroo Point, Queensland, Australia
- Spouse: Henrietta Duncan Clark
- Awards: Mueller Medal
- Scientific career
- Fields: Botany
- Workplaces: Queensland Government
- Author abbrev. (botany): C.T.White

Cyril Tenison White (17 August 1890 – 15 August 1950) was an Australian botanist.

== Early life ==
White was born in Brisbane, Queensland, to Henry White, a trade broker, and Louisa (nee Bailey). He attended school at South Brisbane State School, and was appointed pupil-assistant to the Colonial Botanist of Queensland in 1905, a position previously held by his grandfather on his mother's side, Frederick Manson Bailey. White also succeeded his uncle, John Frederick Bailey, in becoming Queensland's Government Botanist in 1917. The standard author abbreviation C.T.White is used to indicate this person as the author when citing a botanical name.

== Personal life ==
White married Henrietta Duncan Clark, a field naturalist and avid hiker, at South Brisbane on 21 October 1921. They married in Baptist tradition, and had two daughters.

== Career ==
As the Government Botanist, White aided farmers and naturalists in identifying noxious weeds and evaluating native species for pastures and fodder. Between 1915 and 1926, he worked on a 42-part series on weeds which appeared in the Queensland Agricultural Journal. His books, An Elementary Textbook of Australian Forest Botany (1922) and Principles of Botany for Queensland Farmers (1938) were used as the textbooks for courses in forestry that he held at University of Queensland. In 1921–1927, he authored a 41-part series on Queensland trees. Also, he co-wrote a 12-part, illustrated series on eucalyptuses with William Douglas Francis which appeared in Queensland Naturalist in 1924–1934.

He collected a number of species from Queensland, neighbouring states, New Guinea, and New Caledonia. These helped to build up the Queensland Herbarium, where he insisted on keeping full data on distribution of all catalogued species. His friend and fellow naturalist Estelle Thomson also provided him with specimens for the Queensland Herbarium.

White was mainly interested in woody species and was an authority on tropical species. He was a correspondent of Harvard University's Arnold Arboretum, and published a monograph of North Queensland rainforest species in its journal Contributions from the Arnold Arboretum of Harvard University. In 1944, he instructed Australian Army forestry companies in New Guinea, and conducted surveys of forests of the British Solomon Islands in 1945. He very much enjoyed bushwalking and camping, leading several excursions of the Queensland Naturalists' Club.

He was active in a number of horticultural and geographical societies, including the Royal Society of Queensland. He liked to encourage young researchers to continue their studies, and was affectionately known among them as "C.T." for his enthusiasm and sociability.

== Later life ==
He died, just shy of his 60th birthday, from heart disease at his home in Kangaroo Point, Brisbane. He was cremated.

== Awards and distinctions ==
In 1947, White was awarded the Mueller Medal for his important contributions to Australian botanical science. University of Queensland awarded him an honorary M.Sc. in 1948. From 1951, Queensland Naturalists' Club has held an annual C. T. White Memorial Lecture in his honour.

In September 1950, a few months after his death, a new riverside park at Kangaroo Point was named after him.
