= Thomas Gordon Hartley =

American botanist (1931–2016)

Thomas Gordon Hartley (9 January 1931 in Beaumont, Texas – 8 March 2016 in Canberra, Australia) was an American botanist.

== Biography ==
In 1955 Hartley graduated in botany with the academic degree Bachelor of Science at the University of Wisconsin-Eau Claire. In 1957 he received his Master of Science and in 1962 his Ph.D. degree at the University of Iowa.

From 1961 to 1965 he led an expedition of the Commonwealth Scientific and Industrial Research Organisation to New Guinea for the study of phytochemicals. From 1965 to 1971 he was associative curator at the Arnold Arboretum of Harvard University in Cambridge, Massachusetts. In 1971, he became a senior research scientist at CSIRO Plant Industry, Canberra, Australia.

Thomas Gordon Hartley became notable for his study on the family Rutaceae. He described several new plant taxa and genera from Papua New Guinea, New Caledonia, Australia, Peninsular Malaysia like Maclurodendron and Neoschmidia and wrote revisions on genera like Zanthoxylum and Acronychia. In 1989, he and Benjamin Clemens Stone made a major revision of the genera Melicope and Pelea when they largely synonymized the genus Pelea with the genus Melicope.

In 1969, botanist Hermann Otto Sleumer named a genus of plants from New Guinea, Hartleya (from the family Stemonuraceae) in Hartley's honour.

== Selected works ==
- 1966: A revision of the Malesian species of Zanthoxylum (Rutaceae)
- 1967: A revision of the genus Lunasia (Rutaceae)
- 1969: A revision of the genus Flindersia (Rutaceae)
- 1970: Additional notes on the Malesian species of Zanthoxylum (Rutaceae)
- 1974: A revision of the genus Acronychia (Rutaceae)
- 1975: Additional notes on the genus Flindersia (Rutaceae)
- 1975: A new species of Zanthoxylum (Rutaceae) from New Guinea
- 1977: A revision of the genus Acradenia (Rutaceae)
- 1977: A revision of the genus Bosistoa (Rutaceae)
- 1989: (with Benjamin Clemens Stone): Reduction of Pelea with new combinations in Melicope (Rutaceae). Taxon 38: 119–23
- 2001: Allertonia. On the taxonomy and biogeography of Euodia and Melicope (Rutaceae).
