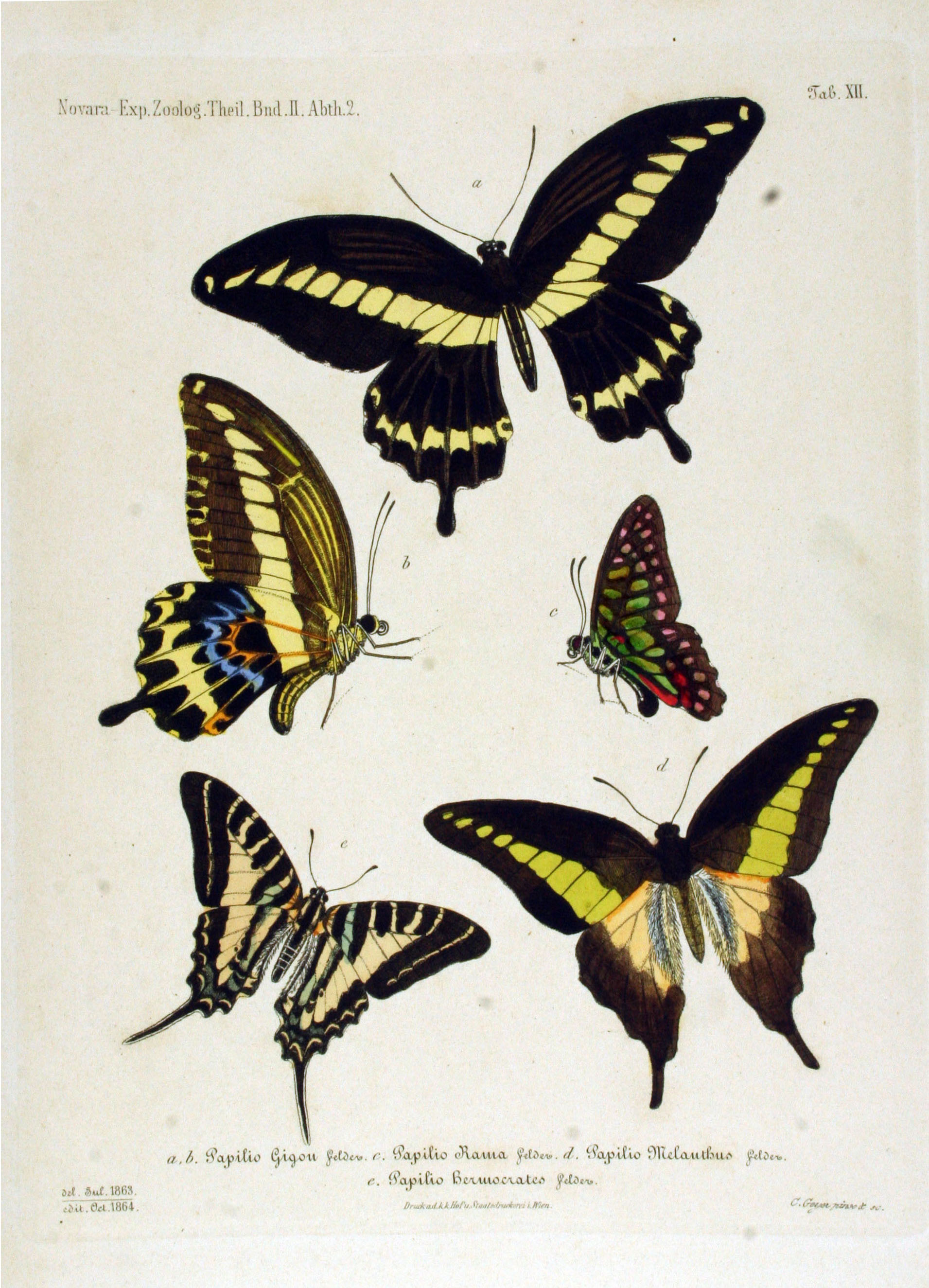
- Plate depicting a. and b Papilio gigon, c. Papilio rama (now Graphium arycles (Boisduval, 1836)), d. Papilio melanthus (now a subspecies of Graphium codrus (Cramer, [1777])) and e. Papilio bermocratesa misspelling of hermocrates (now Graphium aristeus hermocrates (Felder & Felder, 1865))
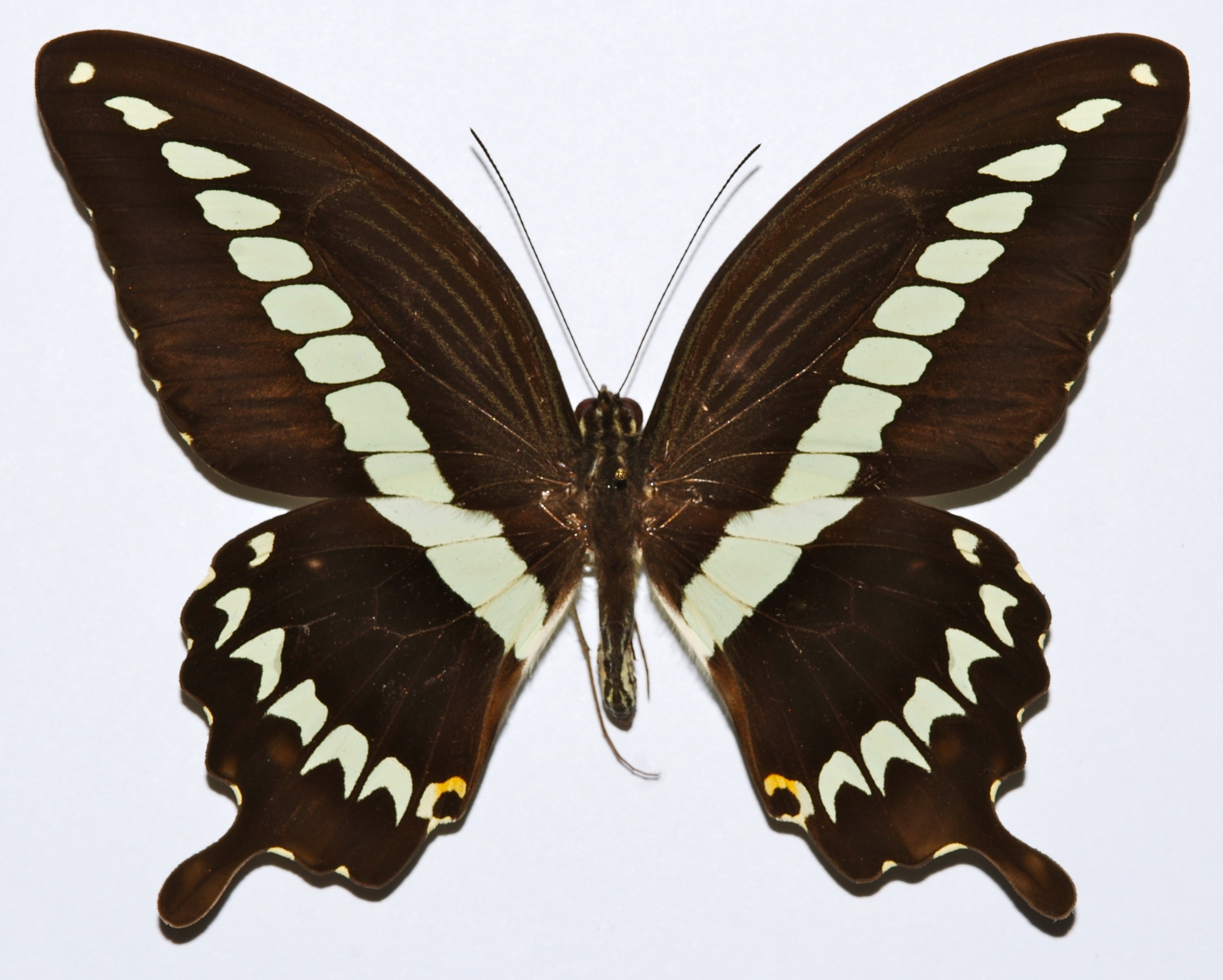

Scientific classification
- Kingdom: Animalia
- Phylum: Arthropoda
- Clade: Pancrustacea
- Class: Insecta
- Order: Lepidoptera
- Family: Papilionidae
- Genus: Papilio
- Species: P. gigon

Binomial name
- Papilio gigon C & R. Felder, 1864

= Papilio gigon =

Species of butterfly

Papilio gigon is a butterfly of the family Papilionidae. It is confined to islands in eastern Indonesia (Sulawesi, Sula and Talaud), but common where found [1].

The wingspan is 120–130 mm.Sexes similar, the female paler than the male Much larger than P. demolion, the costal margin of the forewing as in many Celebes butterflies strongly curved, the cell correspondingly strongly widened; also the cell of the hindwing differently formed from that of demolion, the subcostal arising much further distally than in that species, the band of the hindwing placed basally to the subcostal, cell of the hindwing beneath margined with yellow at the apex; in the genitalia nearest to P. liomedon. The young larva olive-green, prothorax and anal segment each with a pair of long tubercles, above the legs from the head to the anus a white stripe at each side, in the middle of the body a broad, dentate, white transverse band, which is joined to the lateral stripes. The full-grown larva blue-green, on the 3. segment a black transverse band, at the hindmargin of the 4. segment a transverse band which is light brown above, a third transverse band on the 7. and 8. segments, and a triangular lateral spot on the 9. segment; the first band in a larva observed by Kuhn on the island of Bangkai spectacle¬shaped, dark brown. Pupa light grass-green, with long, curved thoracic horn; a lateral stripe from the horn to the anal extremity brown, a central stripe of the same colour on the back

gigon Fldr. (= cresphontes Bdv. nec Cr.) (21 a). On the under surface of the hindwing the first black distal mark is about as broad at the costa as the yellowish white band, and the yellow margining of the apex of the cell is usually narrow and always produced in points at the veins. The whole of Celebes; whether the specimens from Siao and Bangkai agree with those from Celebes is not known to me [Jordan]. Common; its flight very rapid. — neriotes Rothsch., from Talaut and Sangir. The submarginal spots of the forewing beneath confluent, which sometimes also occurs in gigon in which case, however, the veins of this hand are more broadly dusted with white-yellow towards the base than in neriodes; the marginal spots of the hindwing beneath larger in both sexes than in gigon. — mangolinus Fruhst. On the under surface of the hindwing the yellow margining of the cell always broad and the first black discal patch smaller than in gigon and neriotes; Sulla Islands: Mangola and Besi. Very similar to Papilio noblei

The larvae feed on Citrus species and Euodia latifolia, Euodia roxburghiana, and Glycosmis pentaphylla.

== Subspecies ==
- Papilio gigon gigon (Sulawesi)
- Papilio gigon mangolinus Fruhstorfer, 1899 (Sula Islands)
- Papilio gigon neriotes Rothschild, 1908 (Talaud, Sangir)

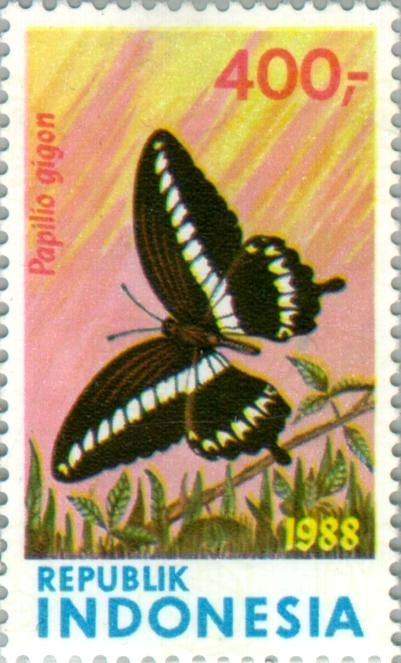

== Philately ==
P. gigas appears on a 1988 postage stamp of Indonesia

== Gallery ==
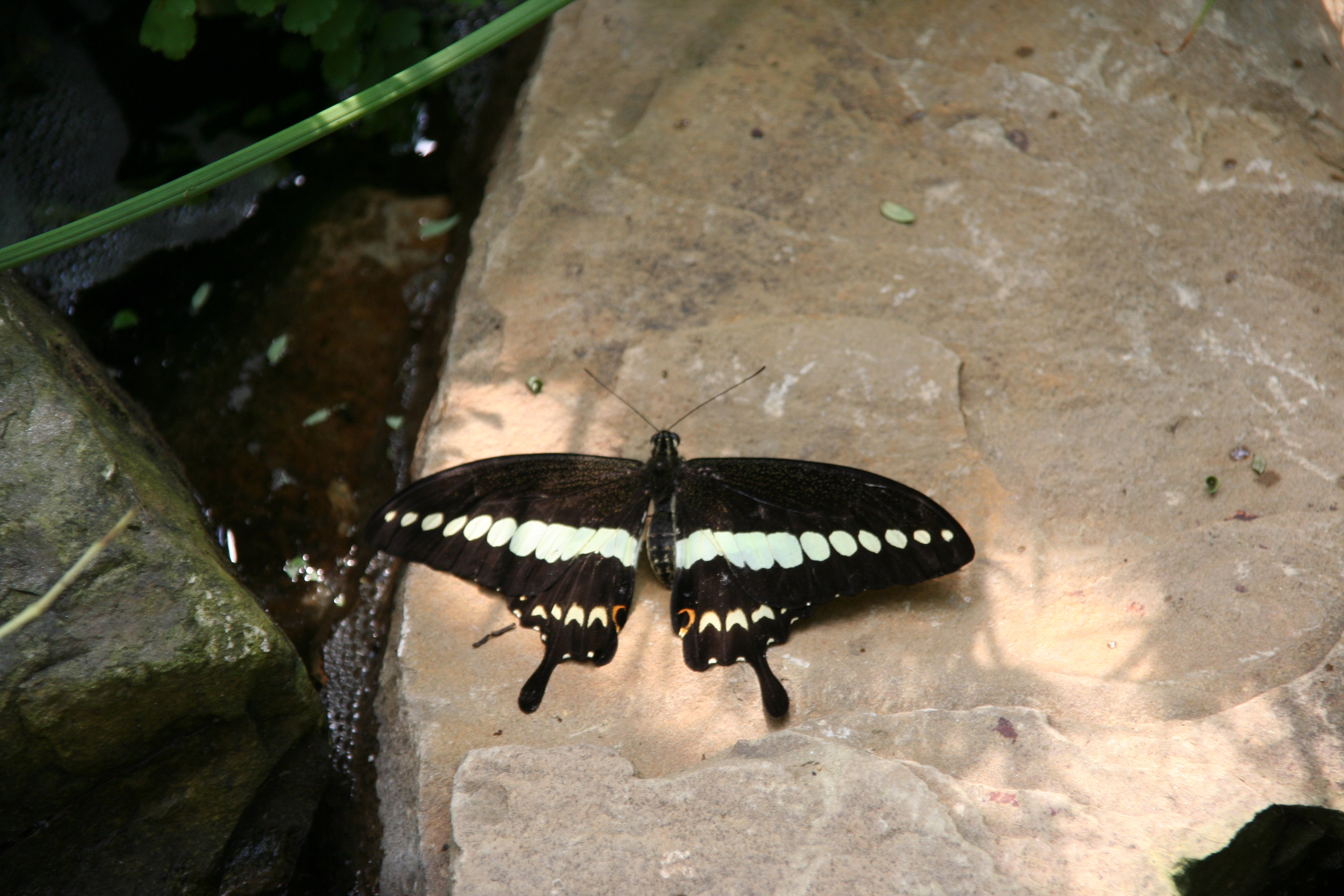
Imago habitus

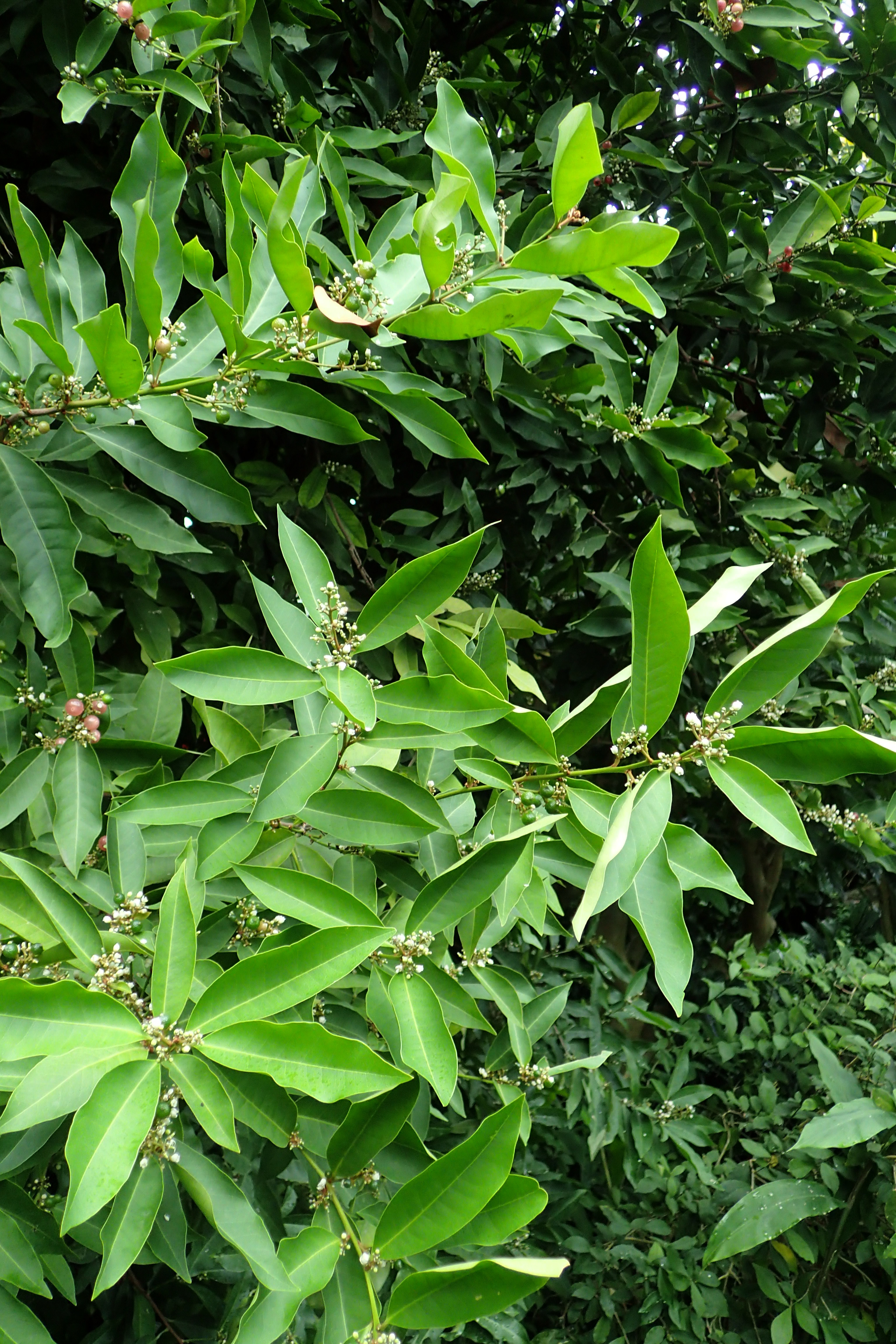
Glycosmis pentaphylla larval foodplant

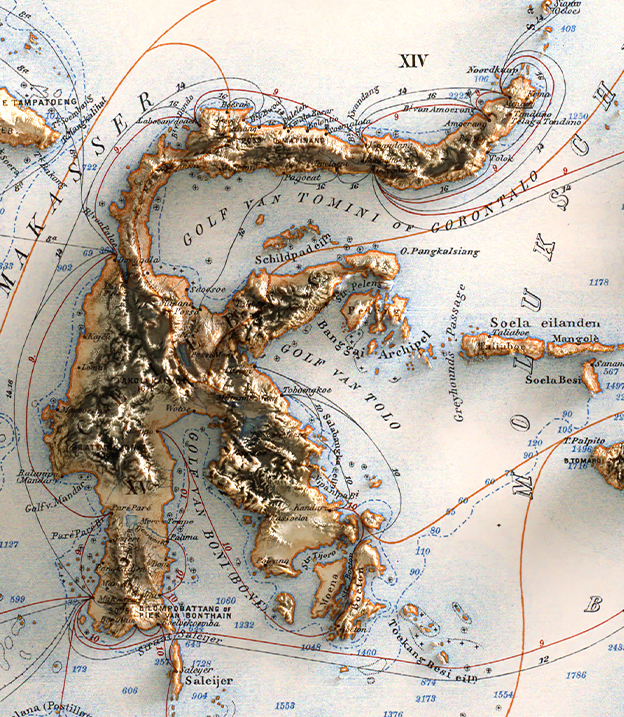
Relief map of Celebes

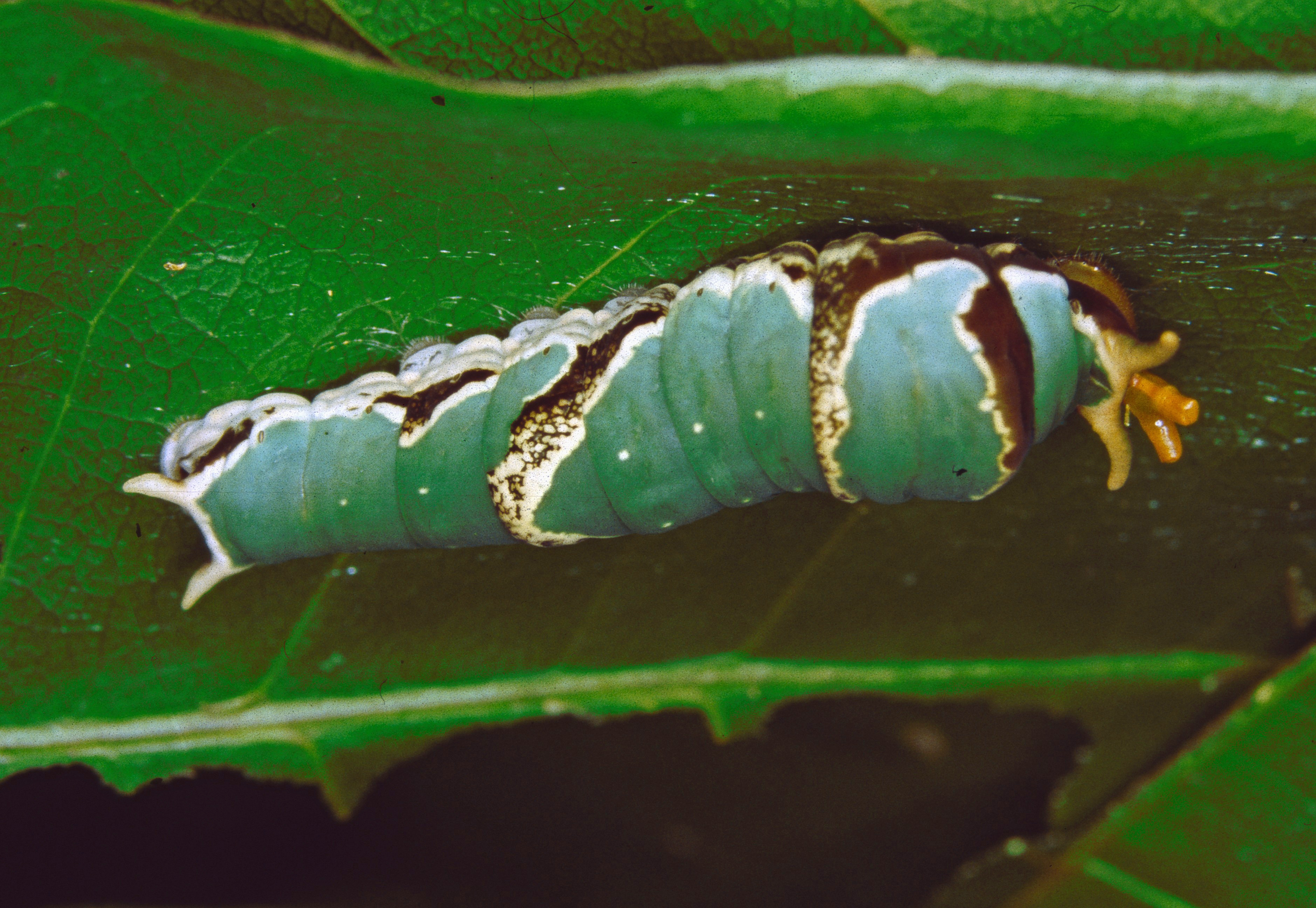
larva
