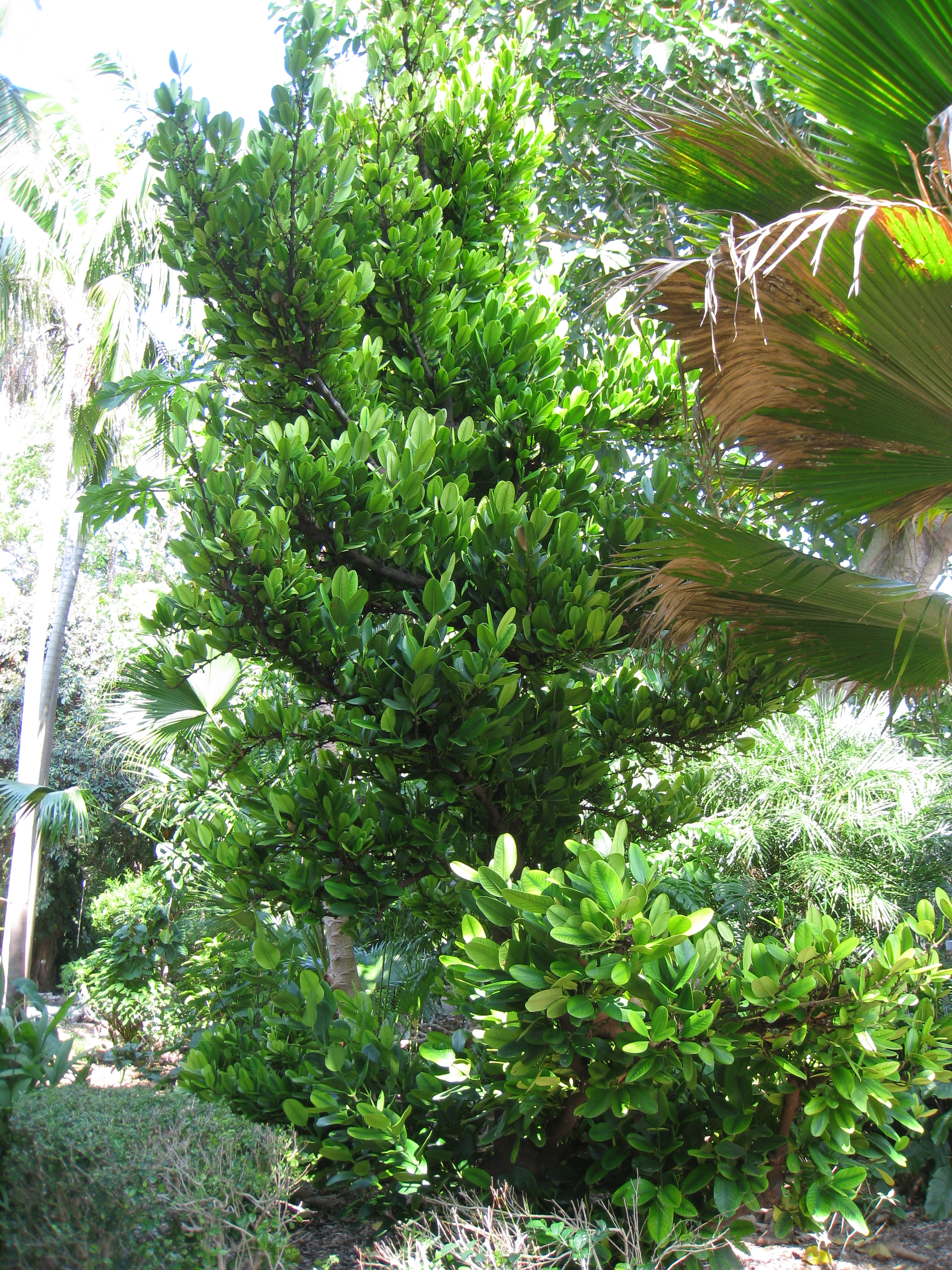

Conservation status
- Least Concern (IUCN 3.1)

Scientific classification
- Kingdom: Plantae
- Clade: Tracheophytes
- Clade: Angiosperms
- Clade: Eudicots
- Clade: Rosids
- Order: Malpighiales
- Family: Clusiaceae
- Genus: Garcinia
- Species: G. spicata

Binomial name
- Garcinia spicata (Wight & Arn.) Hook.f.

Synonyms
- Garcinia ovalifolia (Wight & Arn.) Hook.f.; Garcinia spicata var. glomerata Vesque; Stalagmitis ovalifolia (Roxb. ex Lindl.) G.Don; Xanthochymus ovalifolius Roxb. ex Lindl.; Xanthochymus spicatus Wight & Arn.

= Garcinia spicata =

Species of flowering plant

Garcinia spicata is a species of flowering plant in the family Clusiaceae. It is sometimes called garlic fruit or bitter garcinia. It is a medium-sized tree which grows up 30 ft tall, and is native to southern India and Sri Lanka.

It is native to the lowland and submontane rain forests of southern India, mostly in the Western Ghats, and of Sri Lanka, from 300 to 1,200 meters elevation. It grows in the mid tree forest layer, often associated with the trees Diospyros montana, Melicope lunu-ankenda, Strobocalyx arborea, Otonephelium stipulaceum, and Syzygium laetum.

The tree produces a fruit which is edible and has been described as being similar to durian in flavor. It is planted as an ornamental in sea spray areas.

The species was first described as Xanthochymus spicatus by Robert Wight and George Arnott Walker Arnott in 1834. In 1875 Joseph Dalton Hooker placed the species in genus Garcinia as G. spicata.
