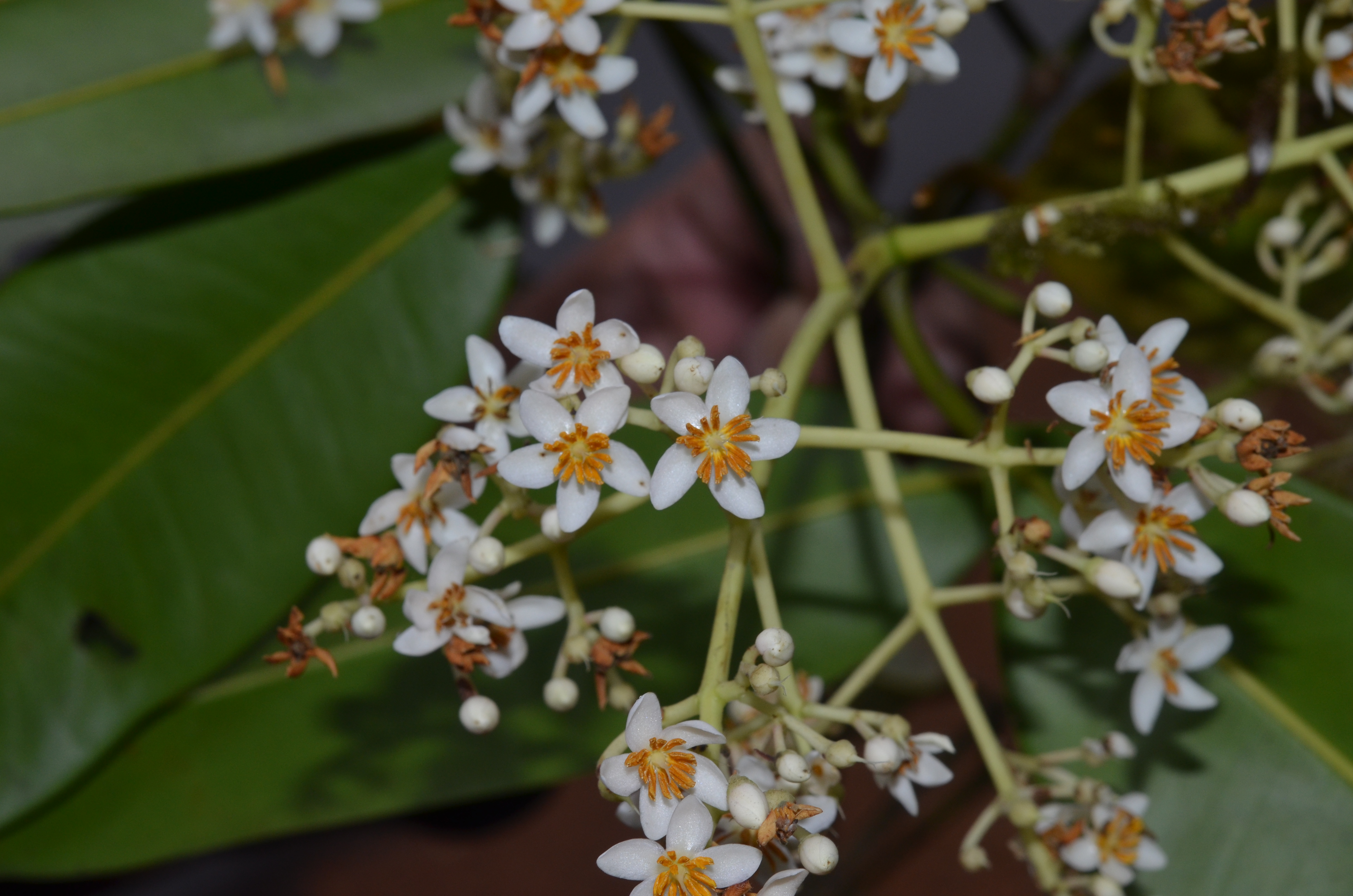

Conservation status
- Least Concern (IUCN 3.1)

Scientific classification
- Kingdom: Plantae
- Clade: Tracheophytes
- Clade: Angiosperms
- Clade: Eudicots
- Clade: Rosids
- Order: Malpighiales
- Family: Calophyllaceae
- Genus: Poeciloneuron
- Species: P. indicum

Binomial name
- Poeciloneuron indicum Bedd. (1865)

= Poeciloneuron indicum =

Species of flowering plant

Poeciloneuron indica is a species of flowering plant in the family Calophyllaceae. It is a tree endemic to the Western Ghats of southwestern India. It is a large canopy tree, up to 30 metres tall, which grows in low- to medium-elevation rain forests from 300 to 1,200 metres elevation. It is locally abundant, and associated with Vateria indica, Otonephelium stipulaceum, Turpinia malabarica, and Melicope lunu-ankenda.
