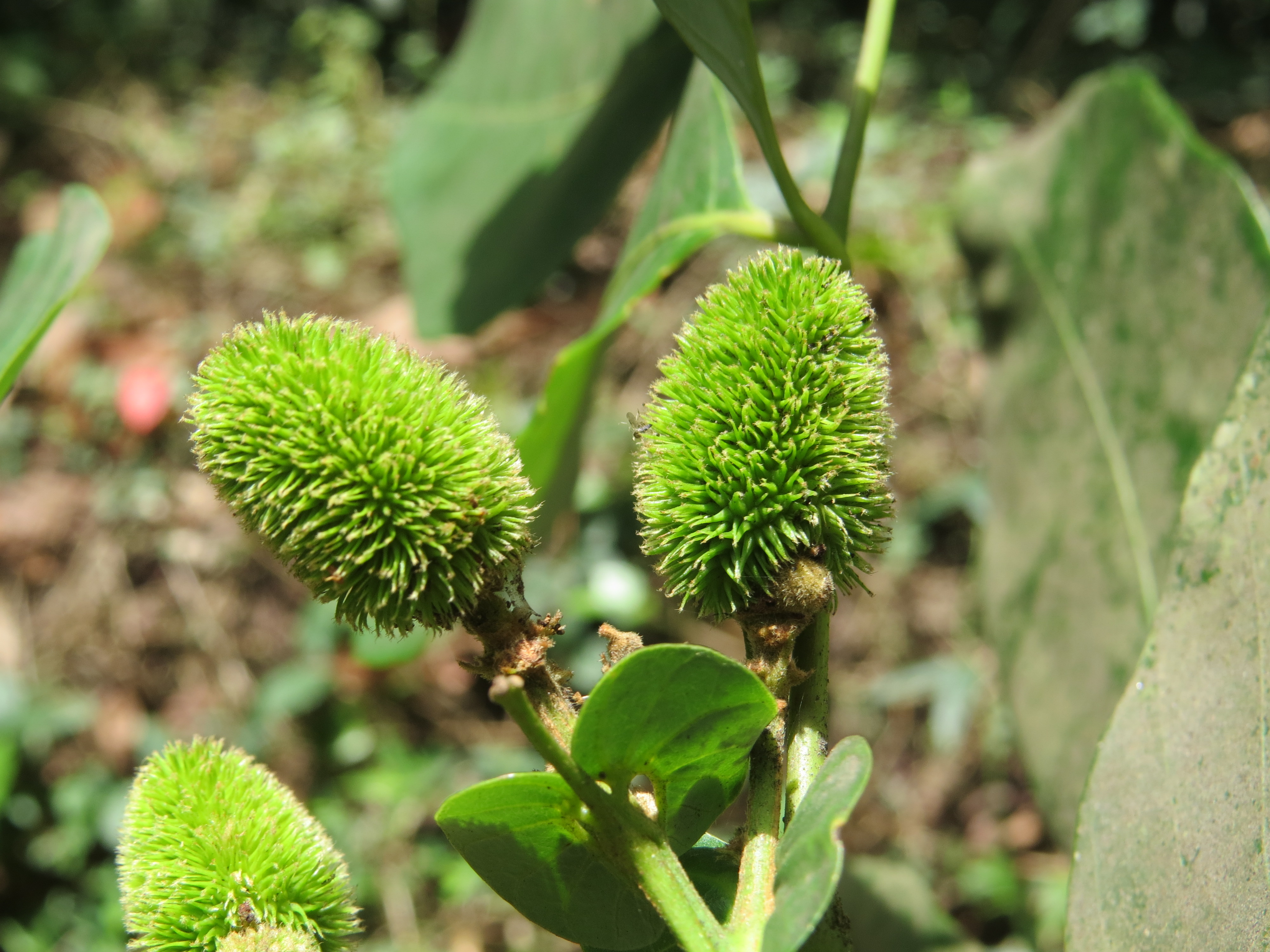

Conservation status
- Least Concern (IUCN 3.1)

Scientific classification
- Kingdom: Plantae
- Clade: Tracheophytes
- Clade: Angiosperms
- Clade: Eudicots
- Clade: Rosids
- Order: Sapindales
- Family: Sapindaceae
- Tribe: Nephelieae
- Genus: Otonephelium; Radlk. (1890)
- Species: O. stipulaceum

Binomial name
- Otonephelium stipulaceum (Bedd.) Radlk. (1895)

Synonyms
- Lepisanthes stipulaceum (Bedd.) J.L.Ellis (1977); Nephelium stipulaceum Bedd. (1864)

= Otonephelium =

Genus of flowering plants

Otonephelium stipulaceum is species of flowering plant in the family Sapindaceae, and the sole species in genus Otonephelium. It is a tree native to the Western Ghats of southwestern India. The genus is closely related to Litchi and Dimocarpus. It is a large mid-canopy tree up to 25 metres tall, which grows in low and medium-elevation rain forests from 400 to 1,200 metres elevation. It is locally abundant and often associated with Vateria indica, Turpinia malabarica, Melicope lunu-ankenda, and Poeciloneuron indicum.
