= Harish Gaonkar =

Indian specialist on butterflies (born 1946)

Harish (Honnayya) S. Gaonkar (born 1946 in Karwar, Karnataka, India) is an Indian specialist on butterflies who contributed to the Zoological Museum at the University of Copenhagen, Denmark and wrote a 1996 compilation of butterflies of Western Ghats, South India cataloguing 330 species. Gaonkar earned his PhD from the University of California, Berkeley.

== Life and career ==
=== Education and work in London ===
Born and raised in Hanehalli, Gaonkar completed his high school education at Anandashram High School, Bankikodla in 1962. In 2001 Gaonkar was a scientific associate of the Natural History Museum in London. In 2004, Gaonkar collaborated on a "Global Butterfly Names" proposal to the ECAT programme of the Global Biodiversity Information Facility. The proposal was submitted by James Mallet, professor of biological diversity at University College London, concerning a major collaboration between developed and developing countries backed by the Natural History Museum, London, to provide an open, online, complete and up-to-date database of the about 80,000 names applied to about 17,500 butterfly species. Gaonkar was described as one of the named NHM staff members, postdoctoral students and scientific associates "with leading skills in butterfly taxonomy" and identified as "representing a critical mass of professional expertise unmatched elsewhere".

=== In Sri Lanka ===
Gaonkar is cited as the source of the list of butterflies endemic to Sri Lanka at Michael and Nancy van der Poorten's website "Butterflies & Dragonflies of Sri Lanka" in a personal communication of information from a work "The Atlas of the Butterflies of the Western Ghats and Sri Lanka", Natural History Museum, London, apparently still in preparation in August 2009. Gaonkar is frequently cited explaining the origin of the name of the Asian Mormon swallowtail butterflies. He wrote that "the origins of giving common English names to organisms, particularly butterflies for tropical species started in India around the mid 19th century. The naming of Mormons evolved slowly. I think the first to get such a name was the Common Mormon (Papilio polytes), because it had three different females, a fact that could only have been observed in the field, and this they did in India. The name obviously reflected the ... Mormon sect in America, which as we know, practiced polygamy."

== Selected books and publications ==
- Gaonkar, H. (1995) An Annotated Bibliography of the Butterflies of the Indian Region Including Pakistan India Nepal Bangladesh Bhutan Sri Lanka and North Burma OCLC 488215574
- Gaonkar, Harish (1996) Butterflies of the Western Ghats, India (including Sri Lanka) - A Biodiversity Assessment of a Threatened Mountain System. A report submitted to the Centre for Ecological Sciences, Bangalore, India, 86 pp
- O. Yata, H. Gaonkar, "A New Subspecies of Eurema andersonii (Lepidoptera: Pieridae) from South India", Entomological Science, 1999 - ci.nii.ac.jp
- Vane-Wright, Richard I. and Gaonkar, Harish, Department of Entomology, Natural History Museum, London. "The Arhopala butterflies described by Fabricius: A. centaurus is from Java, A. democritus from Phuket (Lepidoptera: Lycaenidae)", Entomological Science, Volume 9 Issue 3, Pages 295 - 311, Published Online: 27 September 2006, link

== See also ==
- Papilio liomedon
- Pieridae
- Small white
