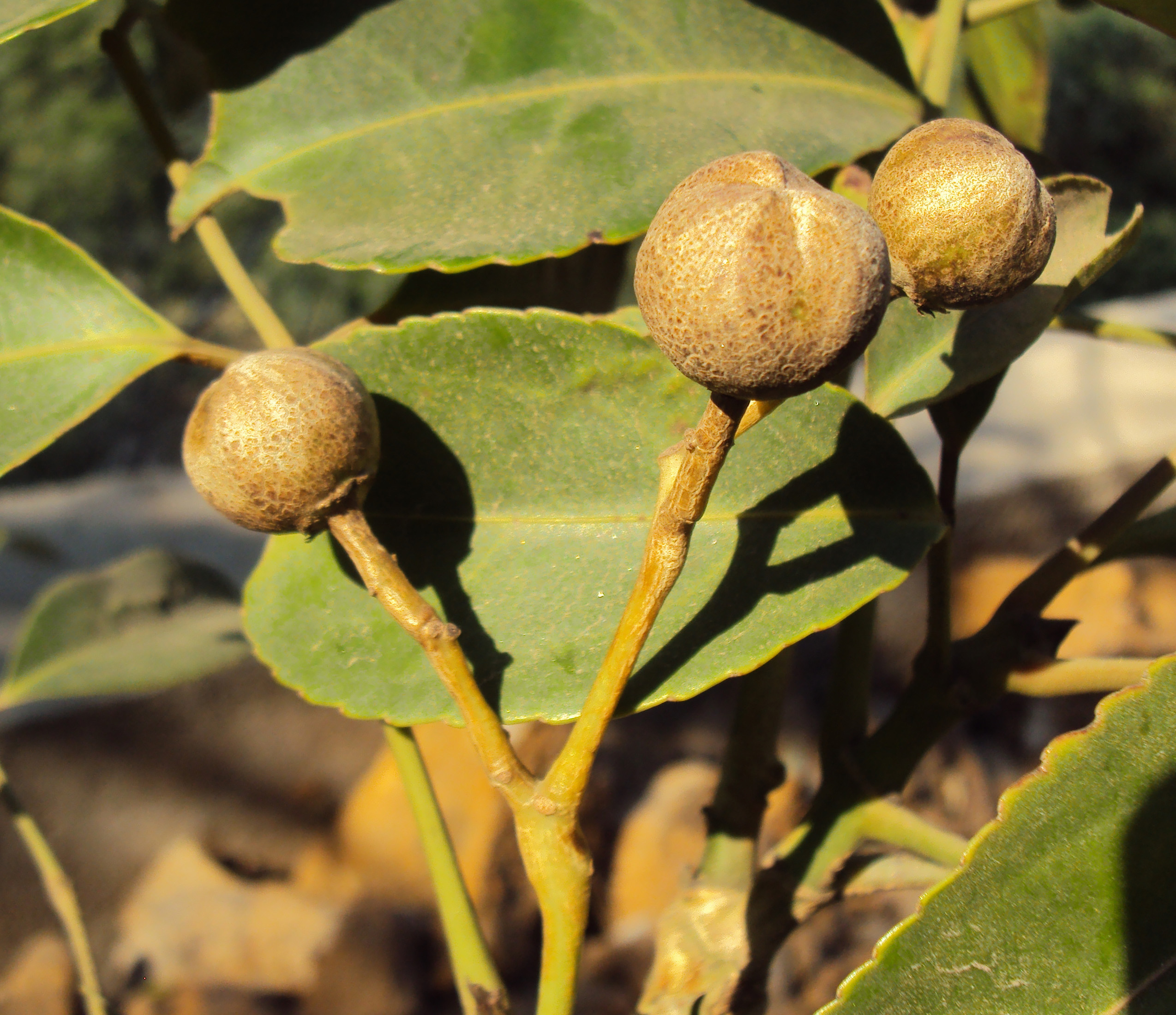
- Turpinia malabarica

Scientific classification
- Kingdom: Plantae
- Clade: Tracheophytes
- Clade: Angiosperms
- Clade: Eudicots
- Clade: Rosids
- Order: Crossosomatales
- Family: Staphyleaceae
- Genus: Turpinia; Vent.

Synonyms
- Eyrea Champ. ex Benth.; Jahnia Pittier & S.F.Blake; Lacepedea Kunth; Ochranthe Lindl.; Triceraia Willd. ex Roem. & Schult.; Triceros Lour.

= Turpinia =

Genus of flowering plants

Turpinia is a genus of trees and shrubs in family Staphyleaceae, native to Asia and North, Central, and South America.

As of December 2023, Plants of the World Online accepted the following species:

- Turpinia brachypetala (Schltr.) B.L.Linden
- Turpinia doanii T.Ð.Ðai & Yakovlev
- Turpinia hatuyenensis T.Ð.Ðai & Yakovlev
- Turpinia malabarica Gamble
- Turpinia montana (Blume) Kurz
- Turpinia occidentalis (Sw.) G.Don
- Turpinia parvifoliola L.O.Williams
- Turpinia paucijuga Lundell
- Turpinia pentandra (Schltr.) B.L.Linden
- Turpinia picardae Urb.
- Turpinia simplicifolia Merr.

== Fossil record ==
One fossil seed of †Turpinia ettingshausenii from the early Miocene has been found in the Czech part of the Zittau Basin.

== Gallery ==
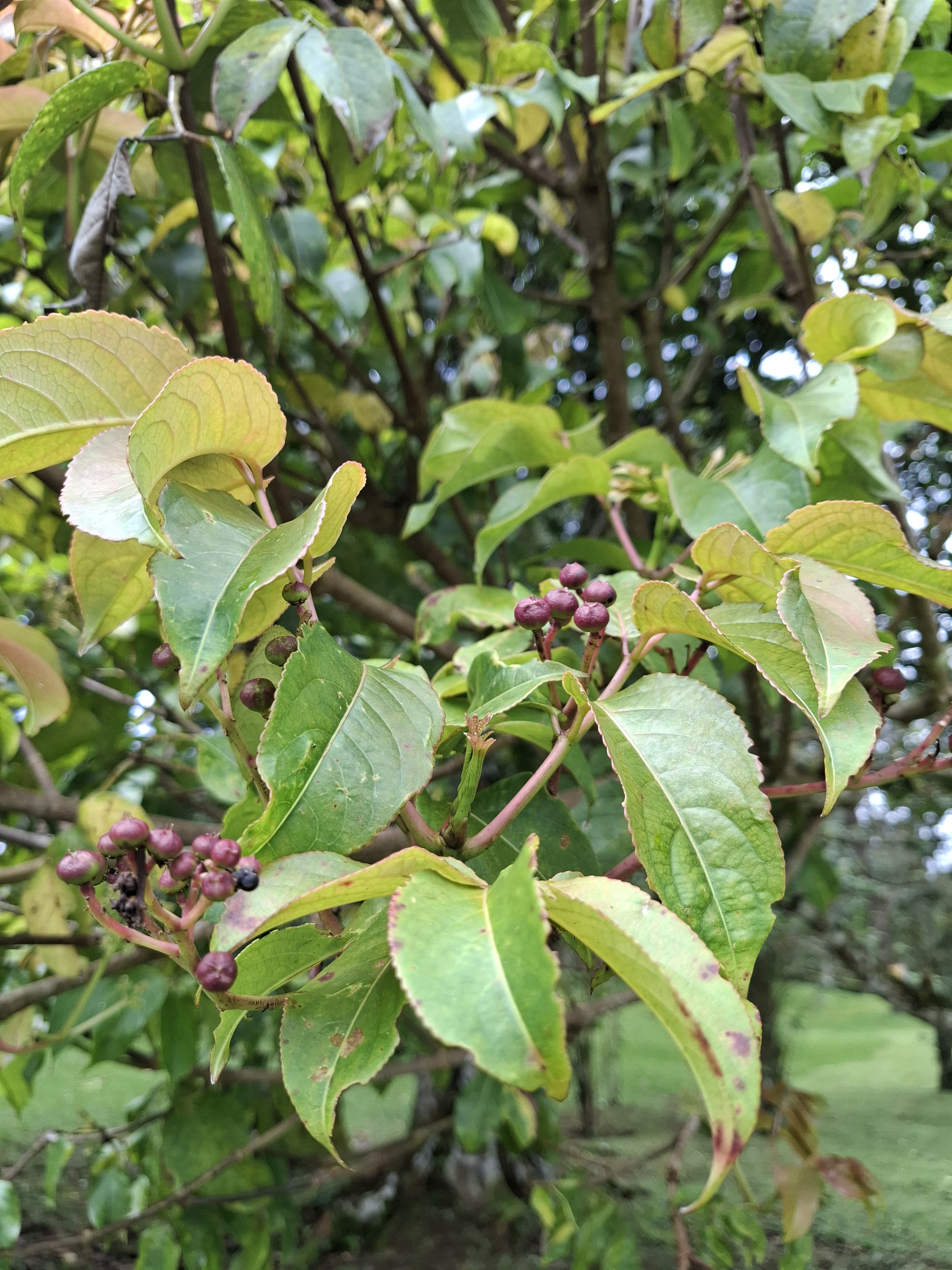
Fruits

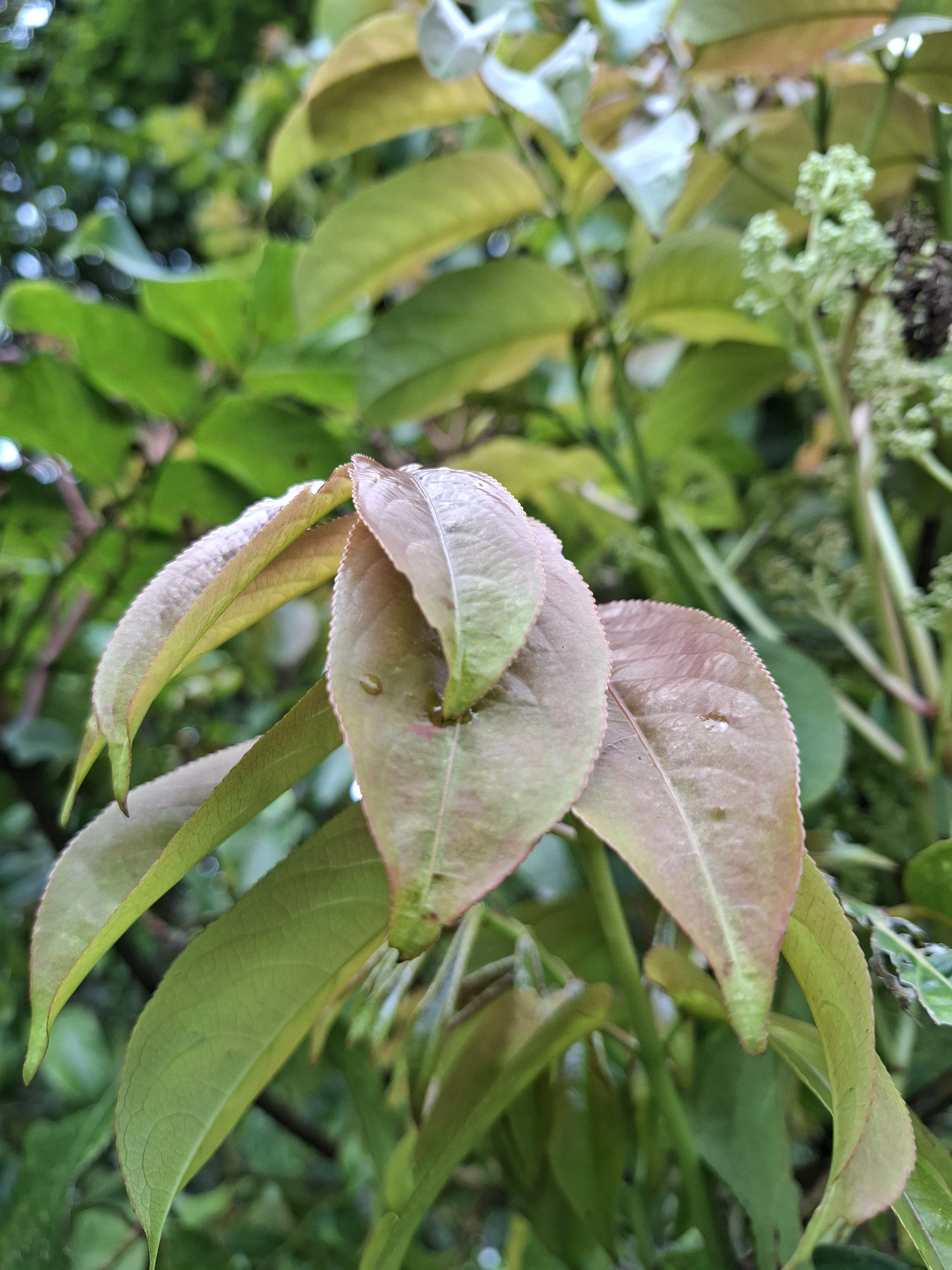
Leaves

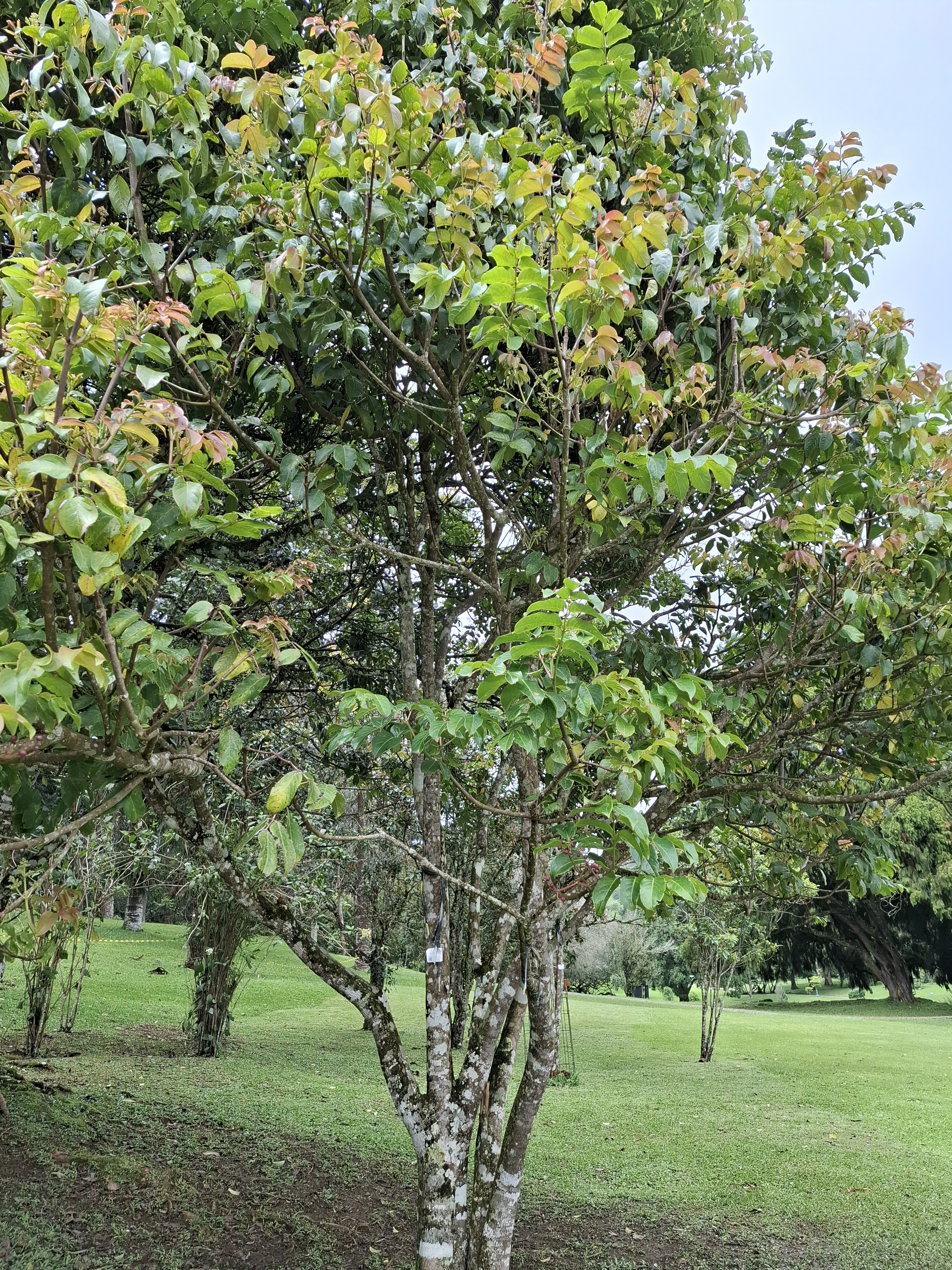
Tree
