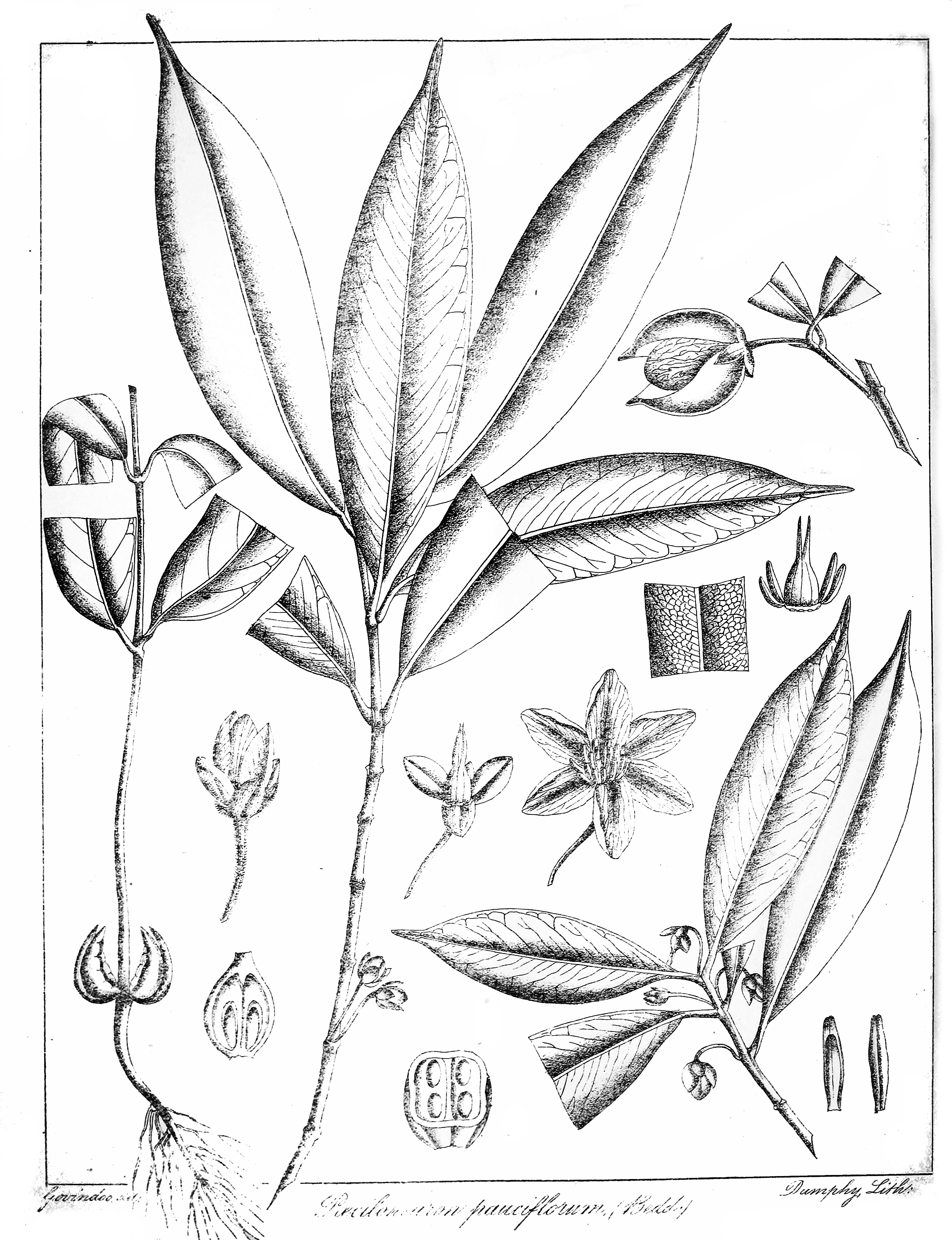

Conservation status
- Critically Endangered (IUCN 3.1)

Scientific classification
- Kingdom: Plantae
- Clade: Tracheophytes
- Clade: Angiosperms
- Clade: Eudicots
- Clade: Rosids
- Order: Malpighiales
- Family: Calophyllaceae
- Genus: Poeciloneuron
- Species: P. pauciflorum

Binomial name
- Poeciloneuron pauciflorum Bedd. (1871)

Synonyms
- Agasthiyamalaia pauciflora (Bedd.) S.Rajkumar & Janarth. (2007)

= Poeciloneuron pauciflorum =

Species of flowering plant

Poeciloneuron pauciflorum is a species of flowering plant in the family Calophyllaceae. It was recorded in Travancore and Tirunelveli (now located in the states of Kerala and Tamil Nadu respectively) in 19th century India. It has not been recorded since. The specific epithet pauciflora is Latin for 'few-flowered'.

== Conservation ==
Mass multiplication using tissue culture is being experimented in a species recovery program by Department of Biotechnology, Gauhati University, New Delhi.
