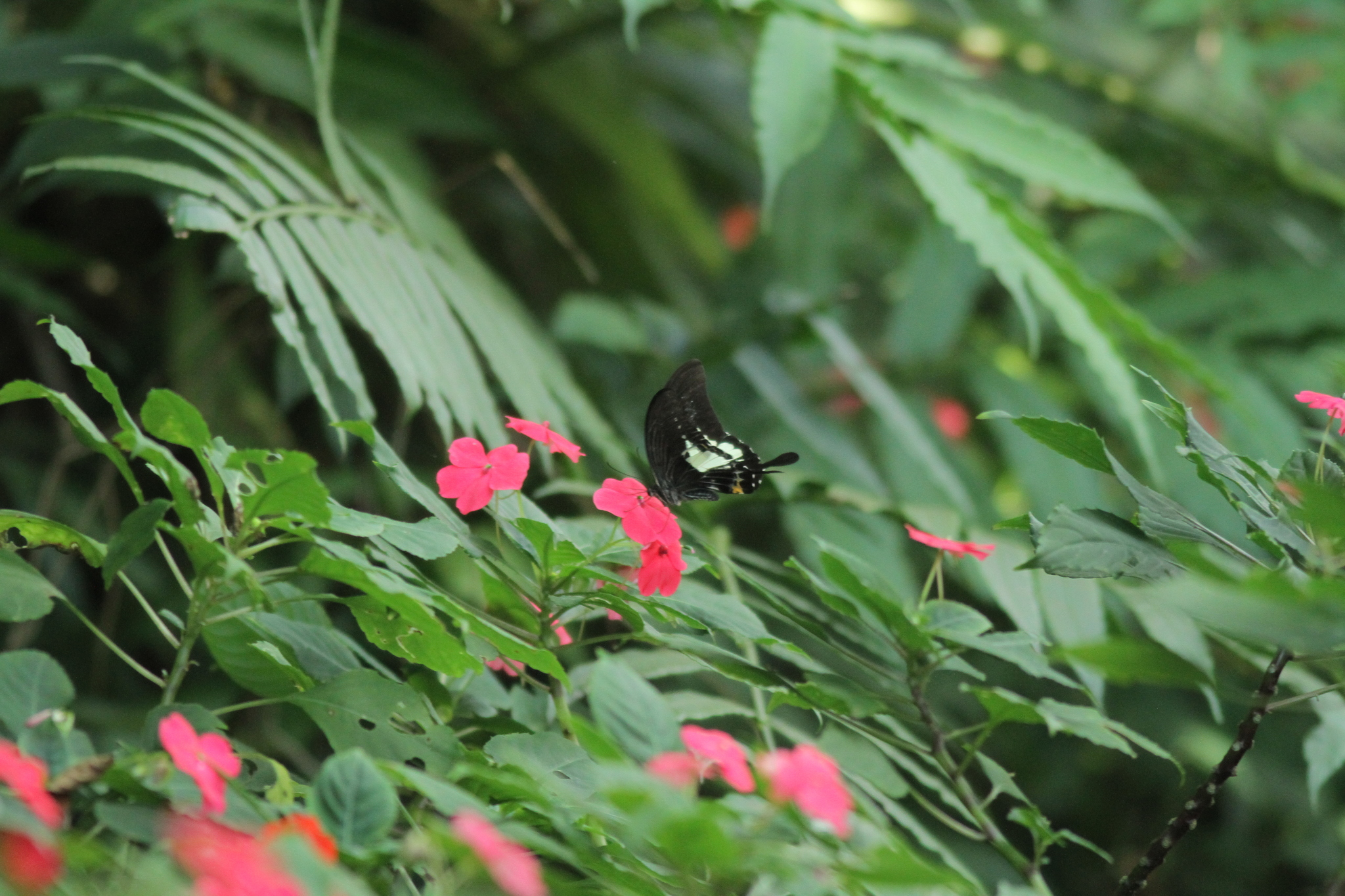
- Live specimen
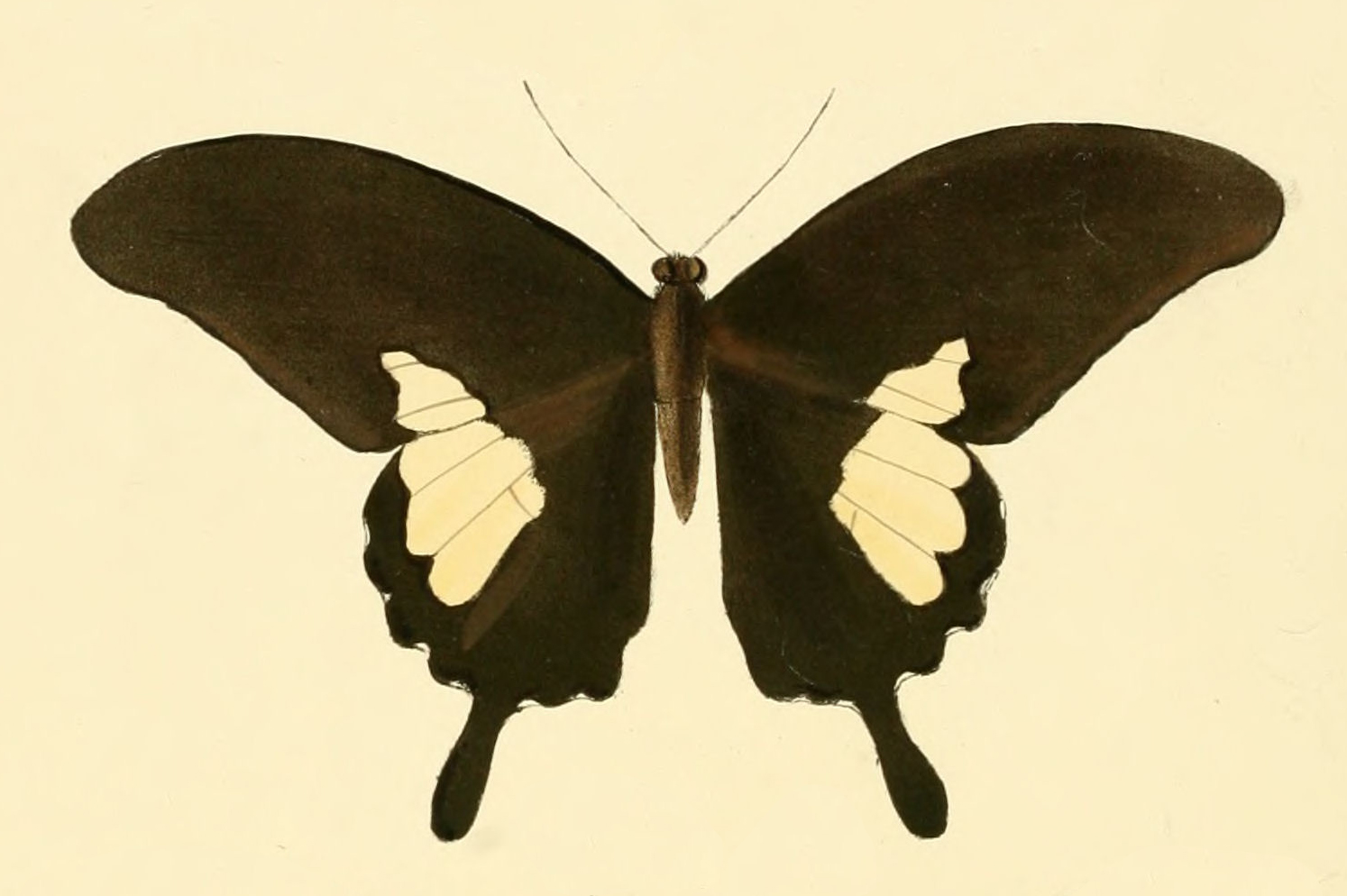
- Hewitson's original figure in Illustrations of new species of exotic butterflies

Scientific classification
- Kingdom: Animalia
- Phylum: Arthropoda
- Clade: Pancrustacea
- Class: Insecta
- Order: Lepidoptera
- Family: Papilionidae
- Genus: Papilio
- Species: P. antonio

Binomial name
- Papilio antonio Hewitson, 1875

= Papilio antonio =

Species of butterfly

Papilio antonio is a butterfly of the family Papilionidae. It is endemic to the Philippines.

The wingspan is 90–110 mm.Forewing above at the hindmargin with triangular white area, which forms the continuation of a large white area of the hindwing; both areas also present beneath. The hindwing beneath with a continuous row of pale yellow submarginal spots, the posterior spots more ochreous. The female quite similar to the male, the white areas somewhat larger. Very similar to Papilio noblei.

== Subspecies ==
There are two recognised subspecies:

- Papilio antonio antonio (Basilan, Leyte and Mindanao)
- Papilio antonio negrosiana Schröder & Treadaway (Southern Negros)

== Taxonomy ==
Papilio antonio is a member of the noblei species-group; closely related to the demolion species group. The members of this clade are

- Papilio antonio Hewitson, [1875]
- Papilio noblei de Nicéville, [1889]
