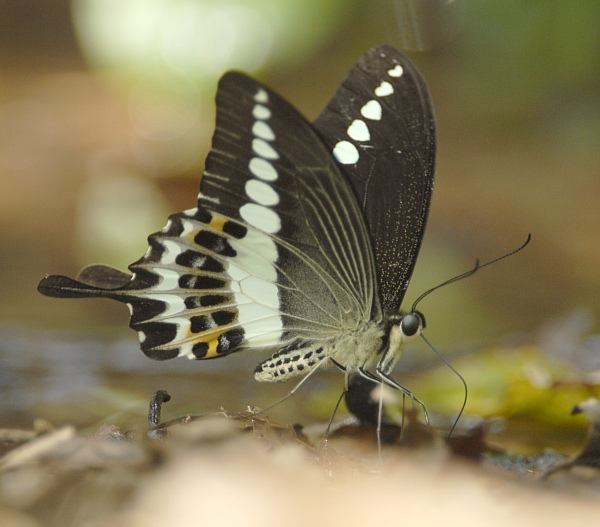

Scientific classification
- Kingdom: Animalia
- Phylum: Arthropoda
- Class: Insecta
- Order: Lepidoptera
- Family: Papilionidae
- Genus: Papilio
- Species: P. liomedon

Binomial name
- Papilio liomedon Moore, 1874
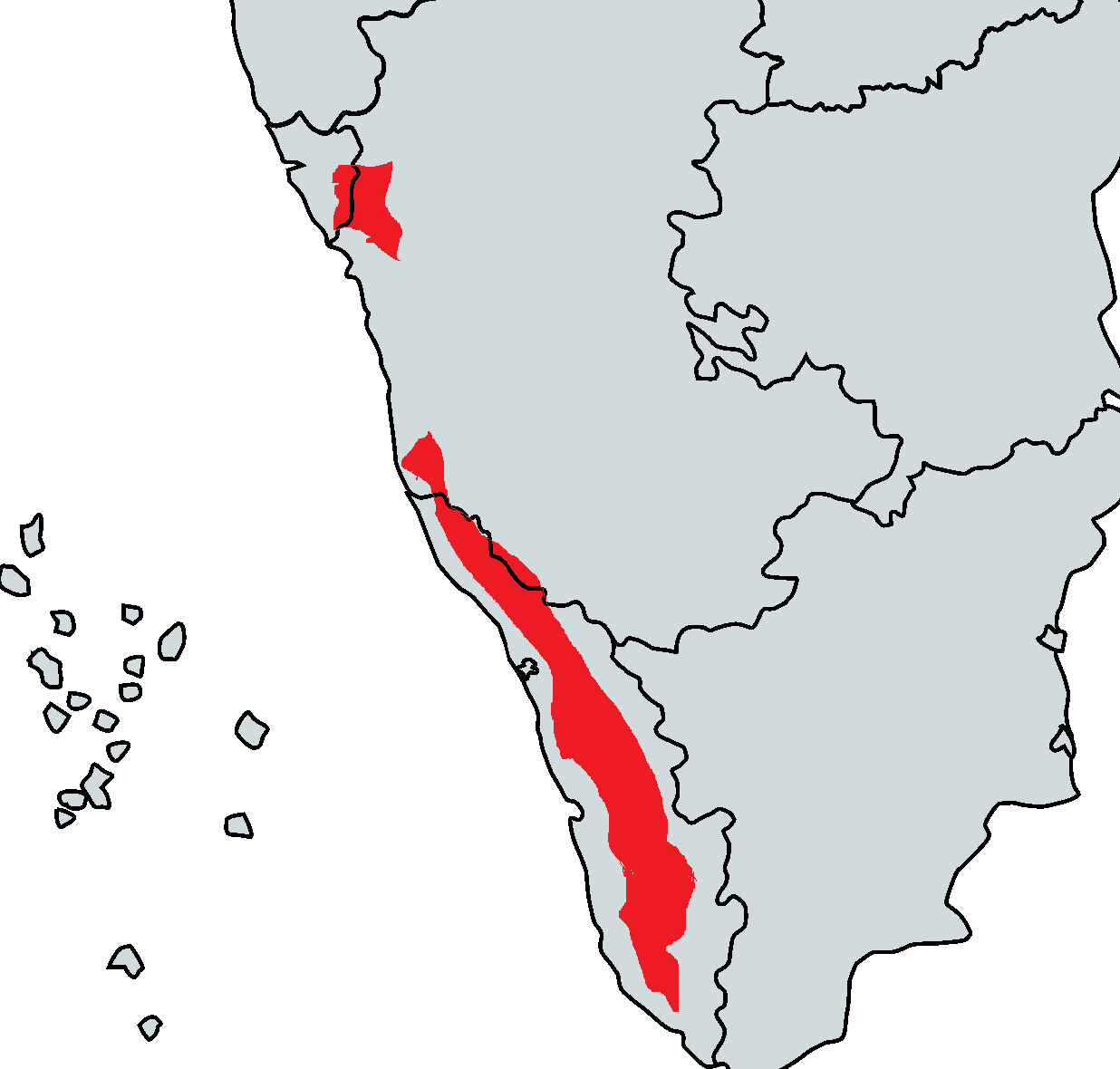

Synonyms
- Princeps liomedon

= Papilio liomedon =

Malabar banded swallowtail

Species of butterfly

Papilio liomedon, the Malabar banded swallowtail, is a member of the swallowtail butterfly family found in southern India. Earlier considered a subspecies of the banded swallowtail (Papilio demolion) of southeast Asia, it is now considered a distinct species.

== Description ==
It is similar to Papilio demolion but distinguishable chiefly by the pale greenish-yellow band that crosses the wings starting from the middle and not from just before the middle of the dorsal margin of the hindwing, also this band is composed entirely of separate spots on the forewing.

Male and female: Upper-side similar to Papilio demolion; but differs on the fore-wing, in all the spots, composing the transverse discal pale sulfur-yellow band, being distinctly separated from one another, and are somewhat smaller in the female. On the hind-wing, the pale sulfur-yellow band is placed farther from the base, with its outer edge extending beyond the cell; the sub-marginal lunules are somewhat larger and have more acute outer points. Underside similar to P. demolion; but with the same differences in the band, on both wings, as on the upper-side, and on the hind-wing the discal black patches between the veins are shorter.

— Frederic Moore, Lepidoptera Indica. Vol. V

== Range ==
Western Ghats and hills of southern India. It is common (May to August) in Thenmala, Kollam district, south Kerala.

== Status ==
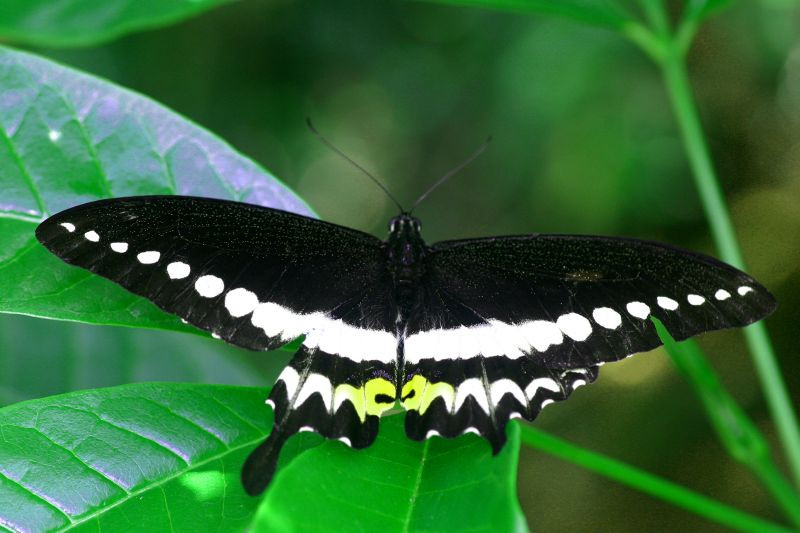

The IUCN Red Data Book records the Malabar banded swallowtail as uncommon and not threatened as a species. However a survey in the early 1990s by Harish Gaonkar showed the butterfly to be rare but distributed from Kerala to Goa. The butterfly was considered to be common in Karwar in the past. It is not to be found in Maharashtra and Gujarat. It is protected by law in India.

== Habitat ==
Generally found in the semi-evergreen and evergreen tropical forests of the Western Ghats where it flies mainly during the monsoon months.

== Habits ==
The males are fond of heavy jungle especially on hilltops. The females fly lower in even thicker jungle. The butterflies visit flowers such as Lantana, Stachytarpheta and Clerodendrum.

== Life cycle ==
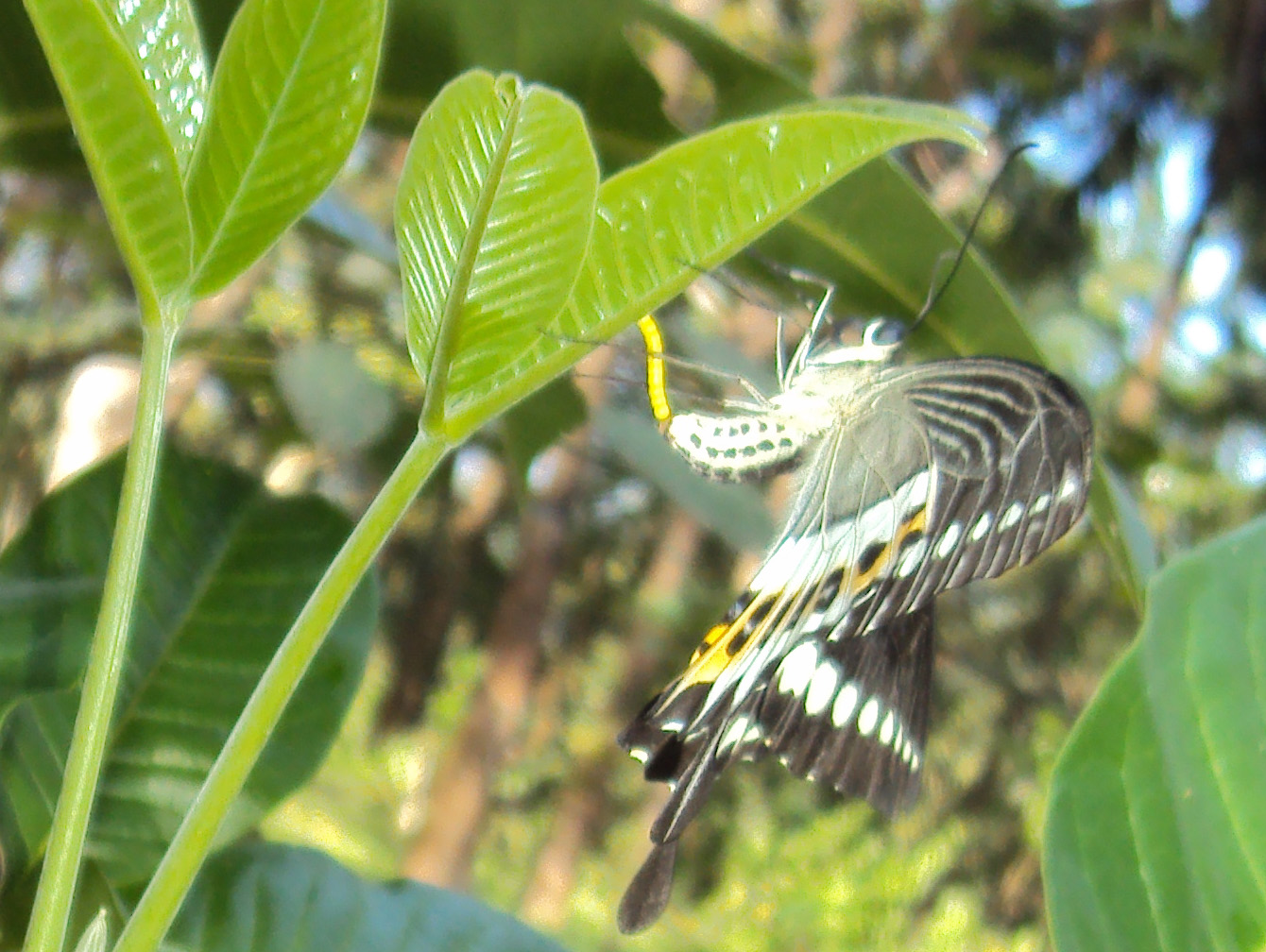
Laying eggs

There are two to three broods a year. Recorded in Kodagu (Coorg) as having broods from September to October, November to December, and, from April to May. Recorded in Karnataka in July and in September. Males appear to outnumber the females.

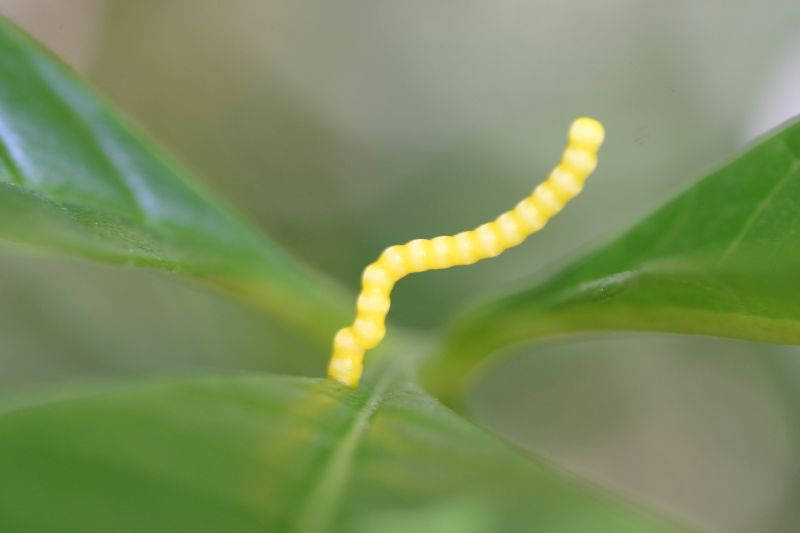
The stick of eggs

The life-history of this insect is given by Messrs. Davidson and Aitken: One of these gentlemen watched a female, P. liomedon, laying its eggs on a tender shoot of a small jungle tree or shrub (Acronychia laurifolia). There were "ten eggs, laid one on top of the other." Of the caterpillars which emerged five days after the eggs were laid, "five passed successfully through all dangers and became beautiful specimens, one female and four males. (This is one of the butterflies of which we rarely find females.) All through their lives these larvae continued gregarious, dispersing occasionally to feed, but always returning to rest side by side on the upper surface of a leaf. The following dates may be interesting. Eggs laid 2 August, hatched 7 August; skins cast (and eaten) 12 August; again 17 August; again 20 to 22 August. The most advanced cast its skin again on the 28th August, became a pupa on the 2nd of September, and emerged on the 15th of September. The others followed within two days. At first the larvae were of an oily yellow colour and bore many pairs of spiny points, but these disappeared with age and after the last moult there were only the short fleshy processes on the 2nd and last segment which characterise the group, and one additional curved pair on the ninth segment." "The colour after the last moult was a clear slaty-blue, changing eventually to a greenish tint, with light brown markings very much the same as those which characterise the rest of the group. The pupa was more abruptly bent back from the middle of the thorax than that of P. erithonius (i. e. P. demoleus) and adorned on the thorax with a sword-shaped horn, fully three-eighths of an inch long, and always bent either to the right or the left. The colour was brown or green and yellow according to situation."

=== Eggs ===
The female lays her eggs one over the other in a stick of ten to sixteen. The orange eggs gradually fade to yellow. The pale black of the larval heads appear on the upperside of the eggs on the fourth day. The eggs hatch on the fifth day.

=== Larva ===
The larvae live gregariously and are heavily parasitized (up to 90%). The first instar lasts about five days, second instar for four days, third instar five, fourth instar four, about three days for the fifth instar and another three days for the sixth instar. They begin to pupate after around 22 days of their larval duration.

== Pupa ==
The lower portion of the pupa is yellow or fluorescent green with purple lines. Between the head and the thorax region a projection like a jug-handle is seen. This is distinctive of the species. Below the thoracic region, two yellow spots are seen. The pupal duration is about 15 days.

== Food plants ==
Acronychia laurifolia and Evodia roxburghiana of the family Rutaceae.

== Other references ==
- Evans, W.H. (1932). The Identification of Indian Butterflies (2nd ed.). Mumbai, India: Bombay Natural History Society.
- Gaonkar, Harish (1996). Butterflies of the Western Ghats, India (including Sri Lanka) - A Biodiversity Assessment of a Threatened Mountain System. Bangalore, India: Centre for Ecological Sciences.
- Gay, Thomas; Kehimkar, Isaac David; Punetha, Jagdish Chandra (1992). Common Butterflies of India. Nature Guides. Bombay, India: World Wide Fund for Nature-India by Oxford University Press. ISBN 978-0195631647.
- Kunte, Krushnamegh (2000). Butterflies of Peninsular India. India, A Lifescape. Hyderabad, India: Universities Press. ISBN 978-8173713545.
- Wynter-Blyth, Mark Alexander (1957). Butterflies of the Indian Region. Bombay, India: Bombay Natural History Society. ISBN 978-8170192329.

== See also ==
- Papilionidae
- List of butterflies of India
- List of butterflies of India (Papilionidae)
