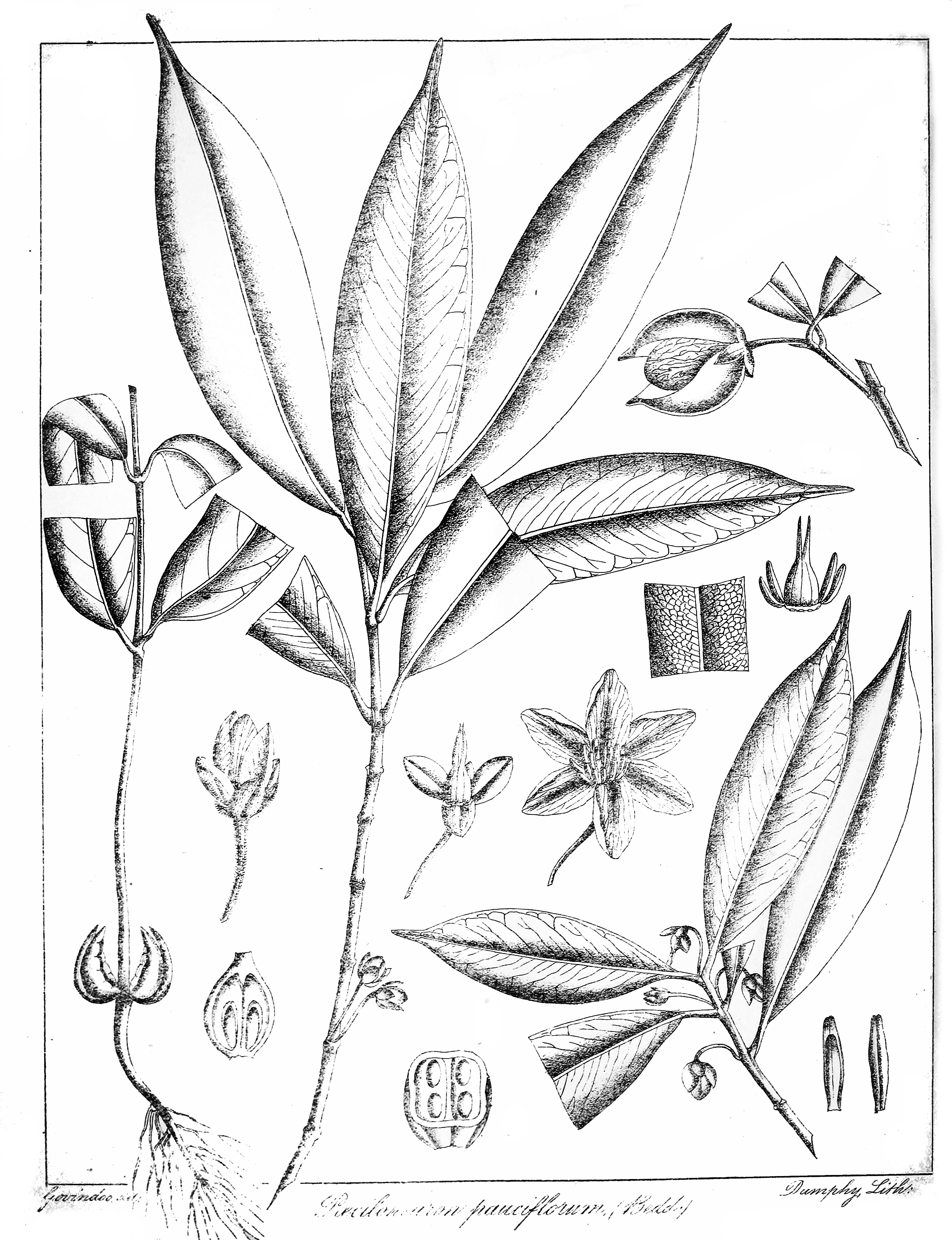
- Poeciloneuron pauciflorum

Scientific classification
- Kingdom: Plantae
- Clade: Tracheophytes
- Clade: Angiosperms
- Clade: Eudicots
- Clade: Rosids
- Order: Malpighiales
- Family: Calophyllaceae
- Genus: Poeciloneuron; Bedd. (1865)

Species
- Poeciloneuron indicum Bedd.; Poeciloneuron pauciflorum Bedd.

Synonyms
- Agasthiyamalaia S.Rajkumar & Janarth. (2007)

= Poeciloneuron =

Genus of flowering plants

Poeciloneuron is a genus of flowering plants in the family Calophyllaceae. It includes two species of trees endemic to southwestern India.

- Poeciloneuron indicum Bedd.
- Poeciloneuron pauciflorum Bedd.
