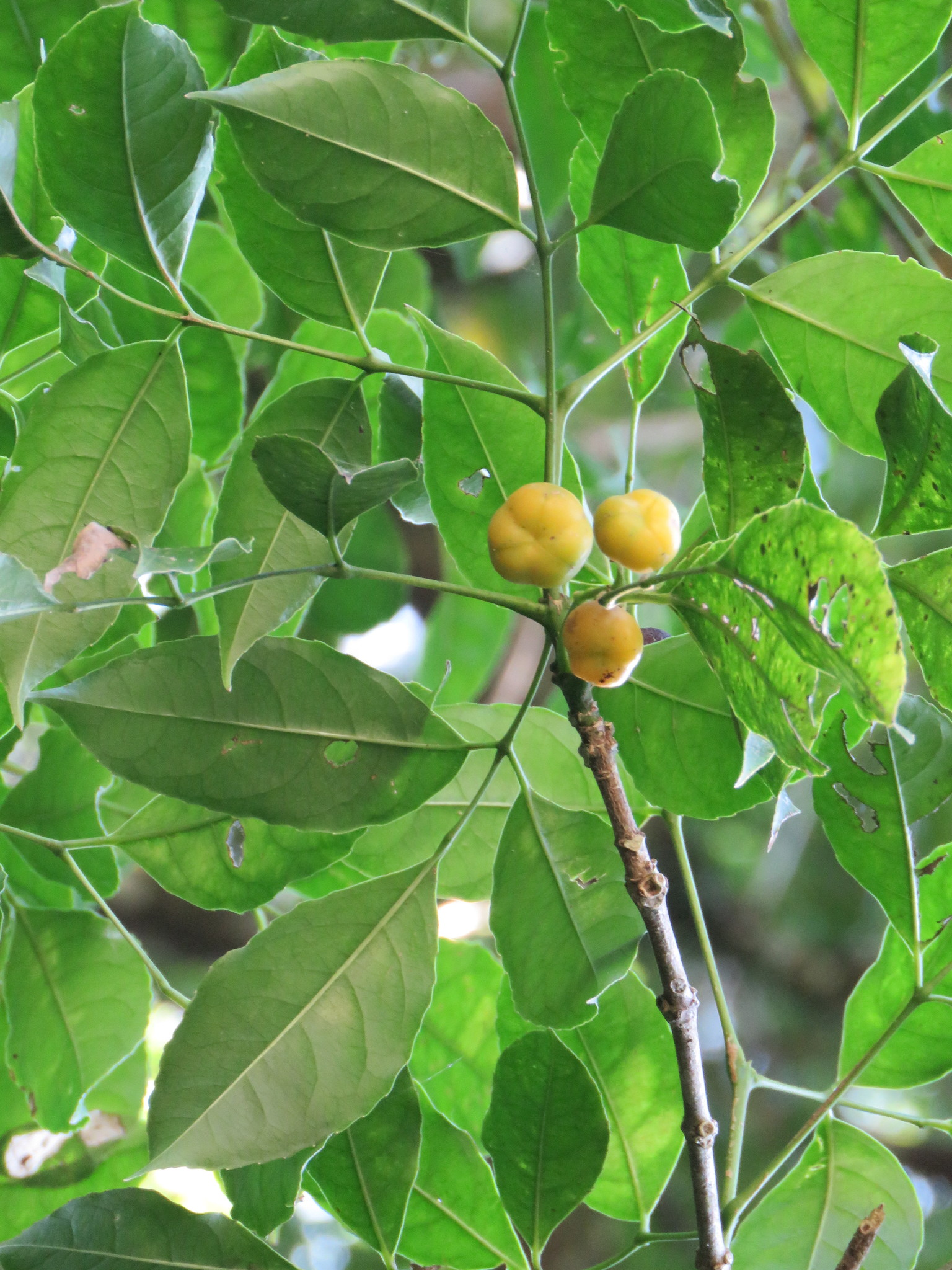

Conservation status
- Least Concern (IUCN 3.1)

Scientific classification
- Kingdom: Plantae
- Clade: Tracheophytes
- Clade: Angiosperms
- Clade: Eudicots
- Clade: Rosids
- Order: Crossosomatales
- Family: Staphyleaceae
- Genus: Turpinia
- Species: T. occidentalis

Binomial name
- Turpinia occidentalis (Sw.) G.Don

Subspecies
- Turpinia occidentalis subsp. breviflora Croat; Turpinia occidentalis subsp. occidentalis

Synonyms
- Maurocenia occidentalis (Sw.) Kuntze; Staphylea occidentalis Sw.

= Turpinia occidentalis =

Species of tree

Turpinia occidentalis, the muttonwood, is a species of tree native to southern Mexico, the Caribbean islands, Central America and northern South America.
