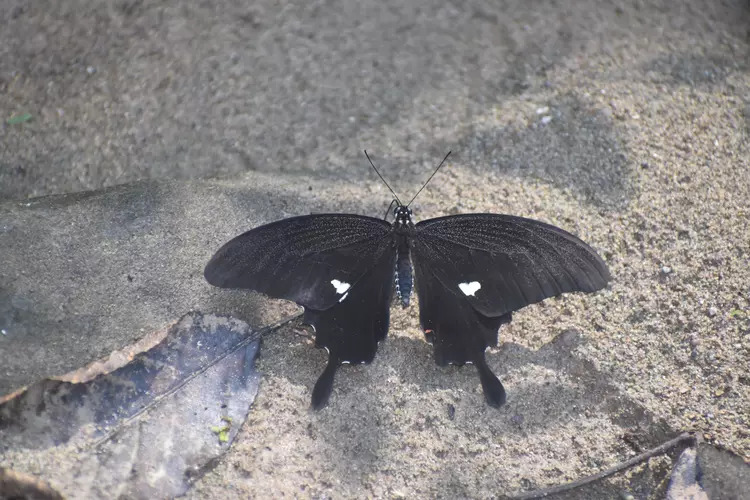

Scientific classification
- Kingdom: Animalia
- Phylum: Arthropoda
- Clade: Pancrustacea
- Class: Insecta
- Order: Lepidoptera
- Family: Papilionidae
- Genus: Papilio
- Species: P. noblei

Binomial name
- Papilio noblei de Nicéville, 1889

Synonyms
- Papilio henricus

= Papilio noblei =

Species of butterfly

Papilio noblei is a butterfly of the family Papilionidae. It is found in Southeast Asia, from Burma to Vietnam. Recently, this species was also sighted in Namdapha National Park, India.

== Description ==
The wingspan is 100–120 mm. On the obverse the forewings are black. The hindwings have tails and are black with a large white macule and a red eyespot in the anal angle. On the reverse side the wings are a little lighter, the front wings have a small white macule on the lower edge, the hind wings have a large white macule and a series of orange lunules in the marginal part. The size of the white macules varies greatly depending on the specimen and the season. Caterpillars have a pair of small horns on the head and another pair on the back of the body. Early instar caterpillars are orange-brown and shiny. 4th and 5th instar caterpillars are green with four brown transverse bands, a bulge at the front of the body, and eye-like eyespots on each side to imitate a snake's head.

== Biology ==
The female lays eggs on plants in the Rutaceae family . The caterpillars consume the leaves of the host plant and go through five instars. They have several means of escaping predators: like all Papilionids, they carry a forked orange osmeterium behind their head which they deploy when they feel threatened and which gives off a malodorous odor, in addition the caterpillars of the 4th and 5th instars imitate a snake's head. Caterpillars often stay together.The caterpillars change into chrysalis on a branch. The chrysalis is held vertically by a silk belt.There are at least two generations per year. It is a tropical rainforest species.

== Taxonomy ==
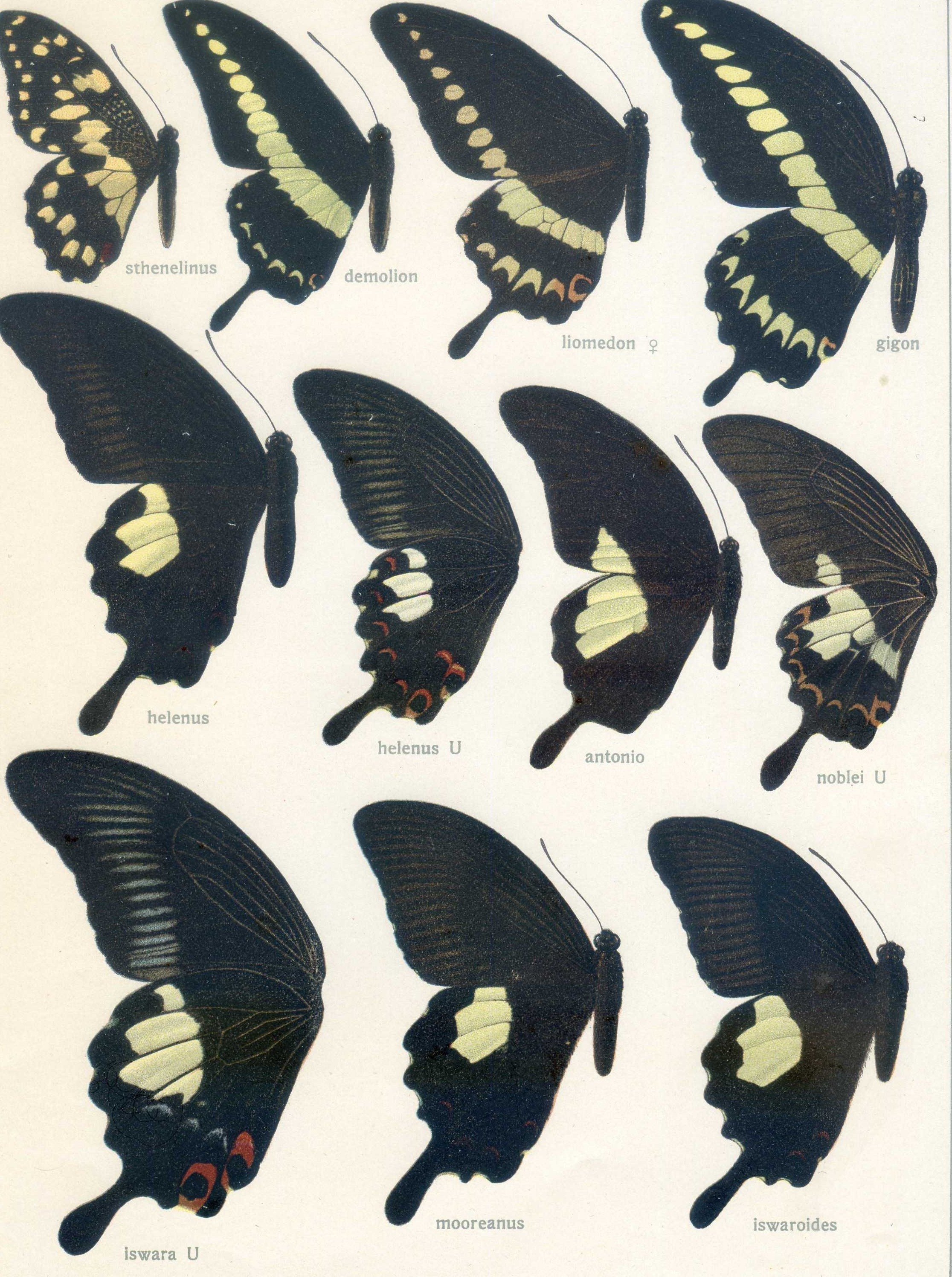
A comparison of the wing patterns of different Papilio species. Left to right, P. noblei's wing is the last on the second row

Papilio noblei is a member of the noblei species group; closely related to the demolion species group. The members of this clade are:

- Papilio antonio Hewitson, [1875]
- Papilio noblei de Nicéville, [1889]

== Subspecies ==
There are two recognised subspecies:

- Papilio noblei hoa Gabriel, 1945
- Papilio noblei noblei

== In Seitz ==
P. noblei Nicev. (— henricus Oberth.) (21 b). Very similar to the preceding species Papilio antonio, but the genitalia quite different. The white spot at the hindmargin of the forewing small, the white area of the hindwing likewise smaller than in P. antonio, only reaching the 2. radial, the costal part of the area especially much narrower than in antonio. The submarginal spots of the hindwing beneath lunular, dark oclire-colour. The body beneath more extended pale yellowish than in antonio. — Upper and Lower Burma, Upper Tenasserim, Central Tonkin. The males rest on the moist sand of the shady banks of rivers; they are very shy and fly up at the least noise, disappearing high above the tree-tops, whence they only return after half an hour or an hour. The females were only taken on Lantana-bushes
