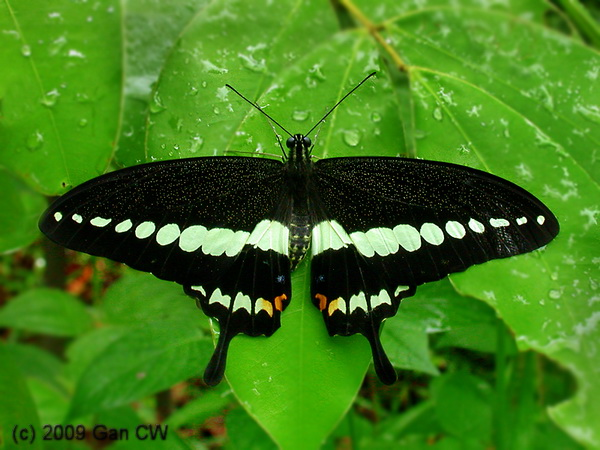

Scientific classification
- Domain: Eukaryota
- Kingdom: Animalia
- Phylum: Arthropoda
- Class: Insecta
- Order: Lepidoptera
- Family: Papilionidae
- Genus: Papilio
- Species: P. demolion

Binomial name
- Papilio demolion Cramer, [1776]

Synonyms
- Papilio demolion energetes Fruhstorfer, 1908; Papilio demolion messius Fruhstorfer, 1908

= Papilio demolion =

Banded swallowtail

Species of butterfly

Papilio demolion, the banded swallowtail, is a species of swallowtail butterfly belonging to the family Papilionidae.

== Subspecies ==
Subspecies include:

- Papilio demolion demolion Cramer, 1776
- Papilio demolion energetes Fruhstorfer, 1908
- Papilio demolion delostenus Rothschild, 1908

== Distribution and habitat ==
This species is present in Brunei, Cambodia, Laos, Singapore, Thailand and Vietnam. These butterflies mainly inhabit nature reserves, wastelands, mangrove areas and offshore islands.

== Description ==
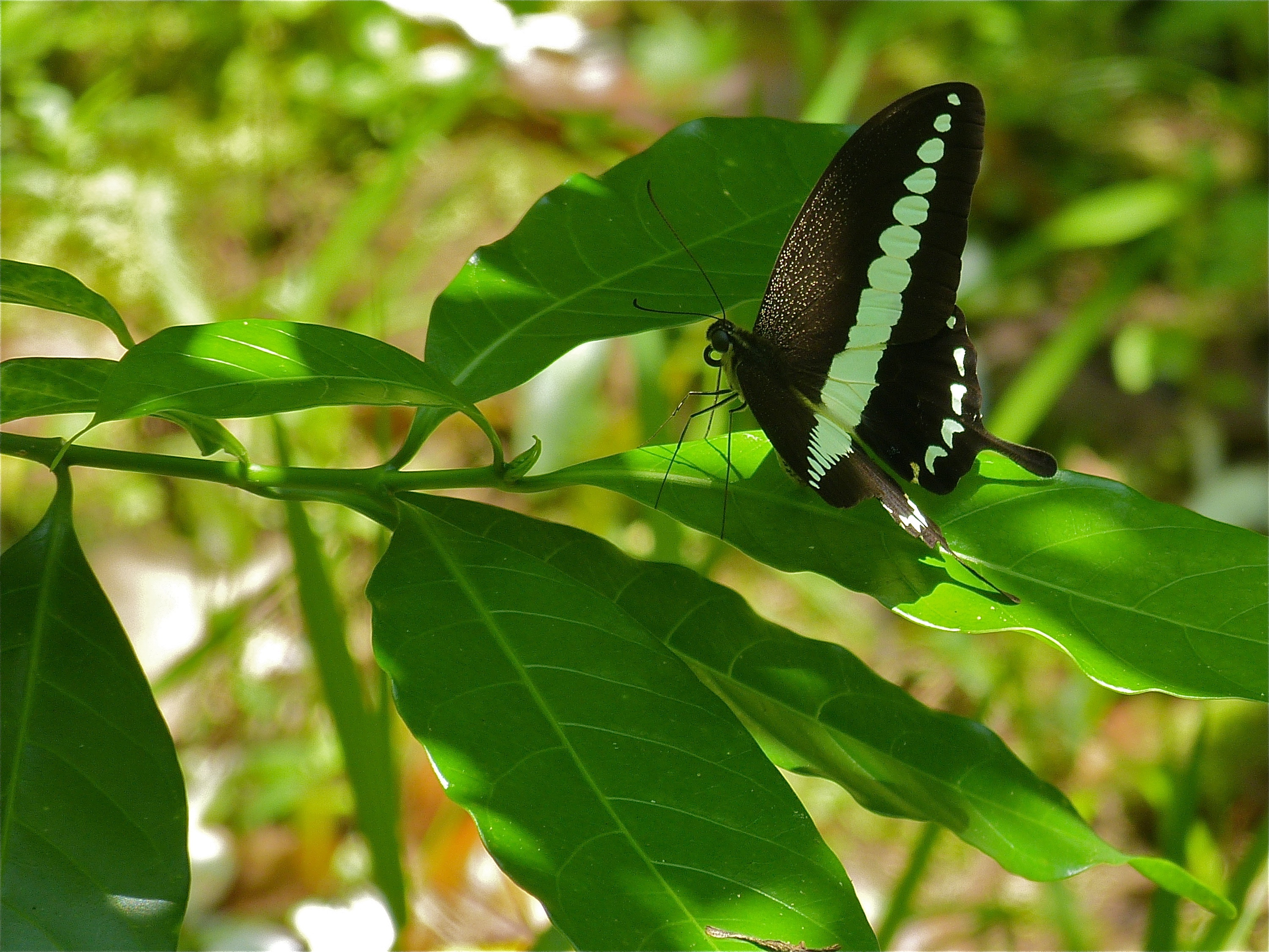
Banded Swallowtail

Papilio demolion has a wingspan of 75–95 mm (3.0–3.7 in).

Male upperside is brownish black. Forewings and hindwings are crossed by a broad prominent oblique pale greenish or yellowish-white band that commences just before the middle of the dorsal margin of the hindwing, crosses over on to the forewing and is continued as a series of spots that diminish in size in the upper interspaces to the apex of that wing. On the hindwing this is followed by a subterminal series of similarly coloured lunules. Underside is fuliginous black, the transverse band that crosses the wings as on the upperside.

Forewing: cell with a series of four slender longitudinal pale lines from base; the veins also picked out with pale lines; on the veins that run to the terminal margin these lines are conspicuous only at the apices; there are besides short similar lines between the veins that extend to the terminal margin.

Hindwing: the interspaces beyond the transverse medial greenish-white band marked with broad jet-black streaks up to the subterminal line of greenish-white lunules; these streaks medially interrupted by a transverse line of blue scales and succeeded in interspaces 1 and 7 by preapical ochraceous-yellow spots; terminal margin beyond the line of lunules black. Antennae, head, thorax and abdomen fuliginous black; beneath, the palpi and abdomen greenish white, the thorax dark grey.

== Life history ==
In flight. Video clip

Adults can be found from January to October. Females lay their eggs in a long string. Eggs hatch in about 3–4 days.

Larvae are "similar to that of P. erithonius (i. e. Papilio demoleus). Anterior segments are scutellated, furnished with two tentacular processes on the 2nd segment and two short fleshy processes on the 9th and anal segments" (Moore). Caterpillars are gregarious in all five instars.

The main larval foodplants are Citrus species, Luvunga crassifolia, Luvunga scandens, Melicope lunu-ankenda and Acronychia pedunculata (Rutaceae). Pupa are "curved abruptly backwards; head bifid; thorax with a lengthened curved acute thoracic process" (Moore). After about twelve days of development the butterfly emerges.
