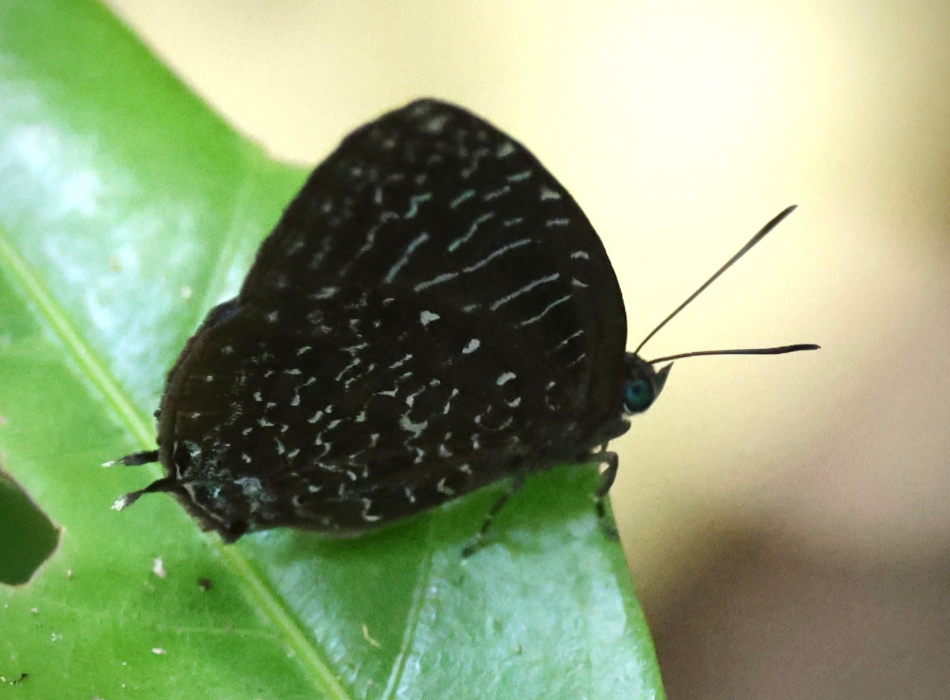

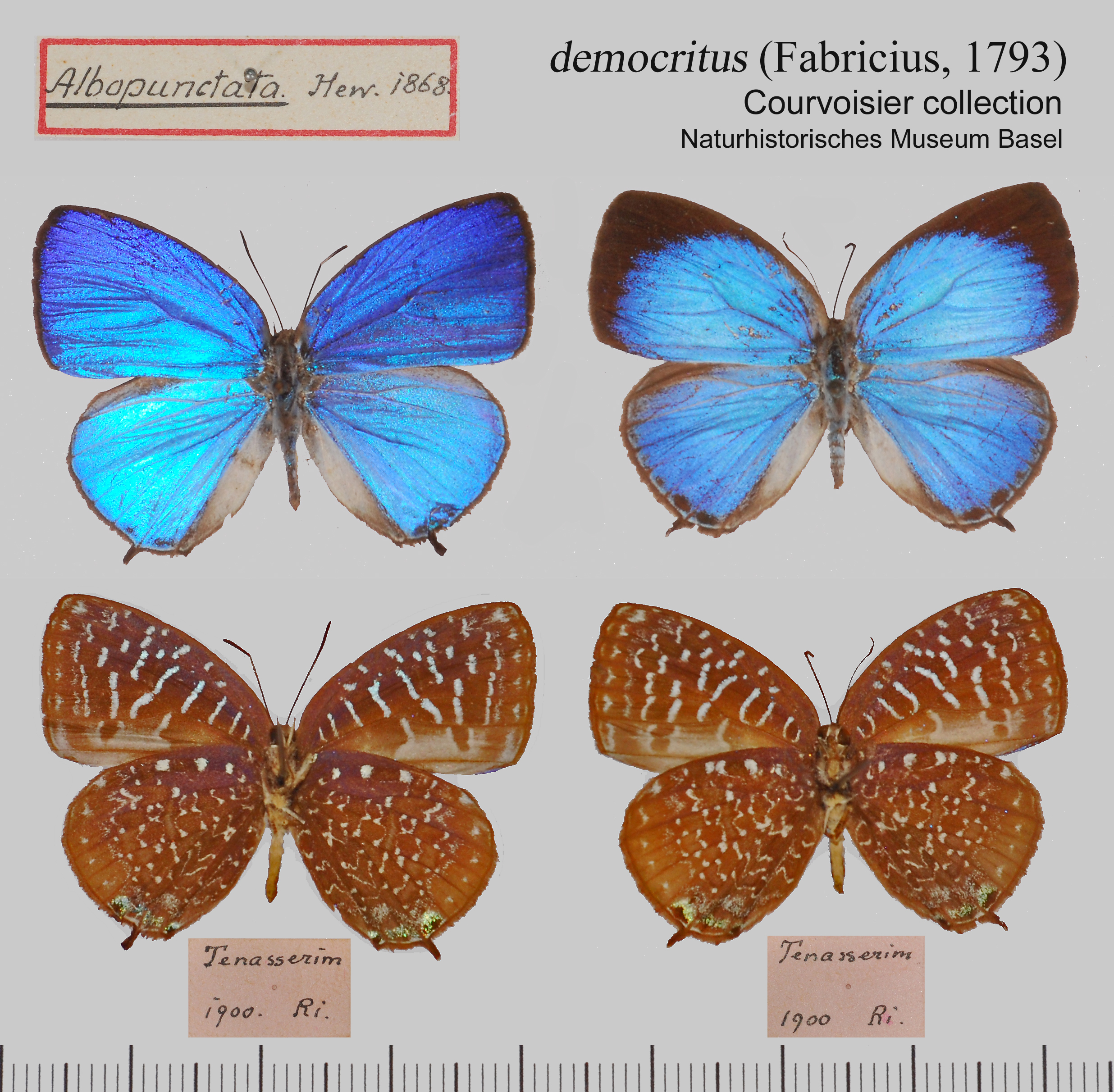

Scientific classification
- Kingdom: Animalia
- Phylum: Arthropoda
- Clade: Pancrustacea
- Class: Insecta
- Order: Lepidoptera
- Family: Lycaenidae
- Genus: Arhopala
- Species: A. democritus

Binomial name
- Arhopala democritus (Fabricius, 1793)

Synonyms
- Hesperia democritus Fabricius, 1793; Amblypodia albopunctata Hewitson, 1869; Amblypodia lycaenaria C. & R. Felder, 1860; Amblypodia buxtoni Hewitson, 1878; Amblypodia olinda Druce, 1873

= Arhopala democritus =

Species of butterfly

Arhopala democritus or white-dot oakblue, is a species of butterfly belonging to the lycaenid family described by Johann Christian Fabricius in 1793. It is found in Southeast Asia (Burma, Thailand, Mergui, Indochina, Langkawi, Peninsular Malaya, Singapore, Sumatra and Borneo).

Male above Morpho-blue, female likewise of a bright blue, though not reflecting so much, with a broad black marginal band of the forewing which begins thin before the centre of the costa, growing 5 mm broad behind the cell, and ending again thin at the anal angle. The under surface is particularly characteristic, since on the dark chestnut-brown ground all the rings and bands are broken up into small commata and dots, so that the chains are hardly noticeable.

== Subspecies ==
- Arhopala democritus democritus (Burma, Thailand, Mergui, Indo China, Langkawi, northern Peninsular Malaysia)
- Arhopala democritus lycaenaria (C. & R. Felder, 1860) (southern Peninsular Malaya, Singapore)
- Arhopala democritus buxtoni (Hewitson, 1878) Sumatra
- Arhopala democritus olinda (Druce, 1873) Borneo
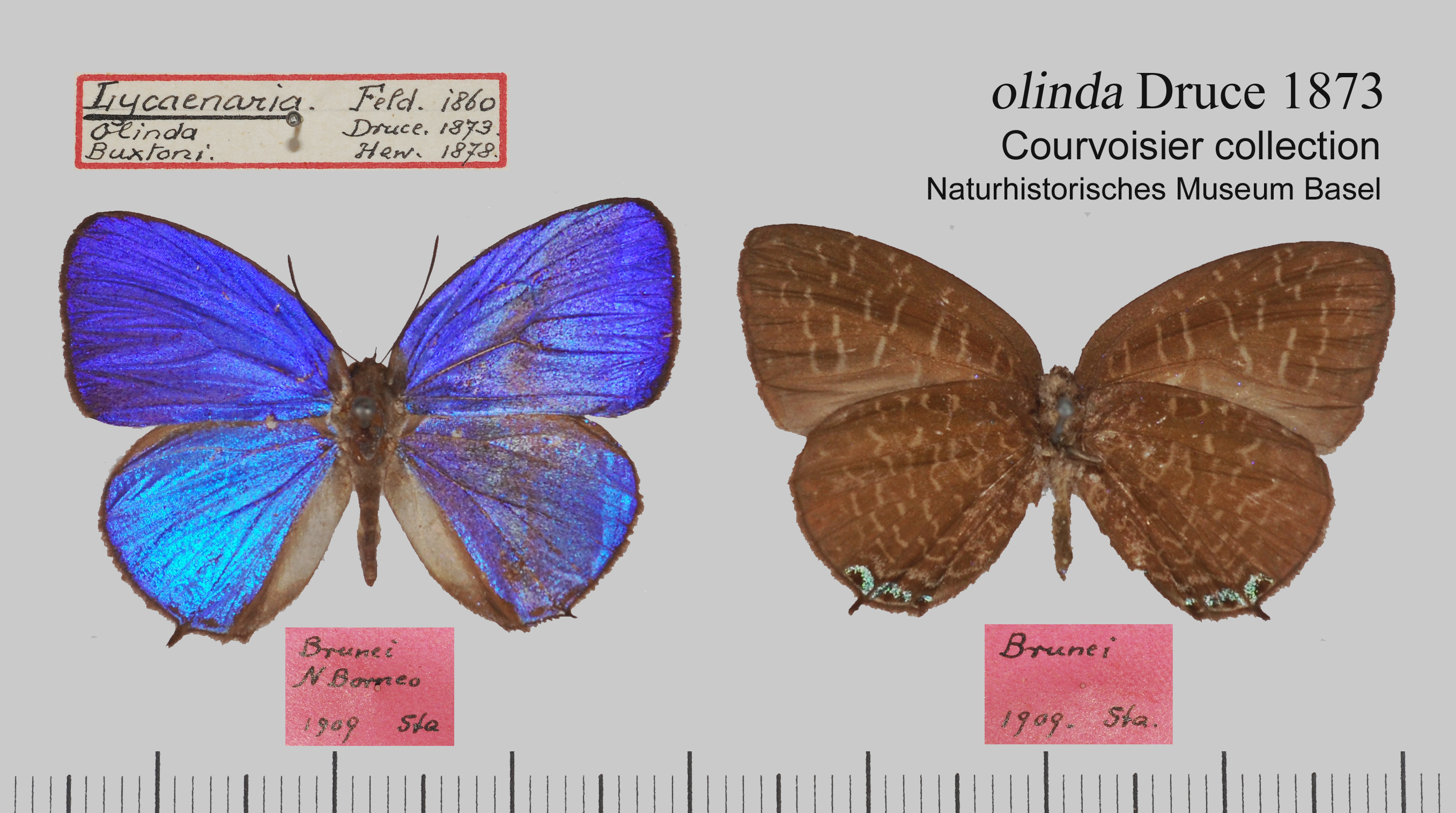
Arhopala democritus olinda
