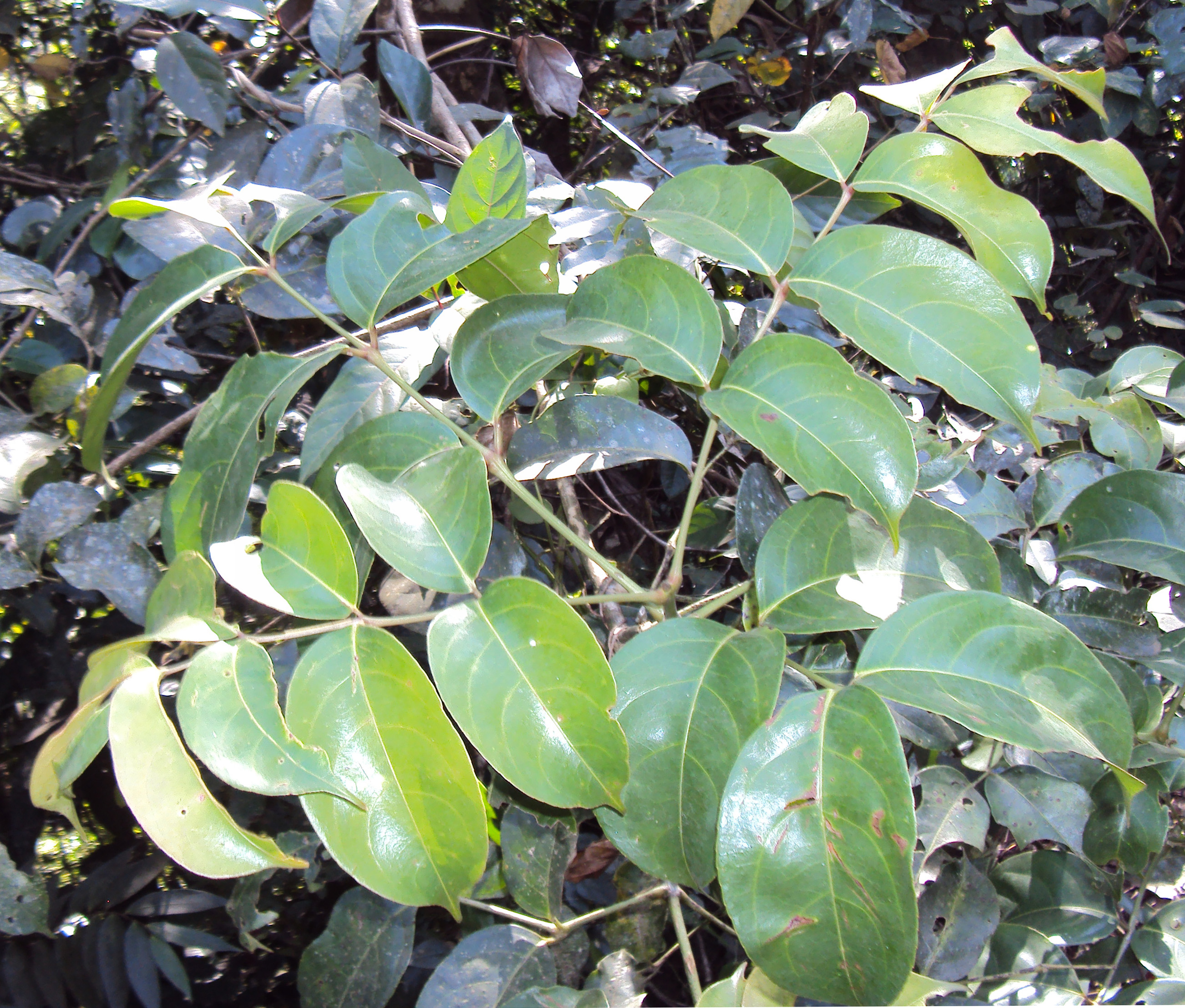
- Leaves of Turpinia malabarica

Scientific classification
- Kingdom: Plantae
- Clade: Embryophytes
- Clade: Tracheophytes
- Clade: Spermatophytes
- Clade: Angiosperms
- Clade: Eudicots
- Clade: Rosids
- Order: Crossosomatales
- Family: Staphyleaceae
- Genus: Turpinia
- Species: T. malabarica

Binomial name
- Turpinia malabarica Gamble

Synonyms
- Turpinia nepalensis var. montana Thwaites

= Turpinia malabarica =

Species of tree

Turpinia malabarica is a species of flowering plant in the family Staphyleaceae. It is a tree species native to Sri Lanka and the Western Ghats of southwestern India.
