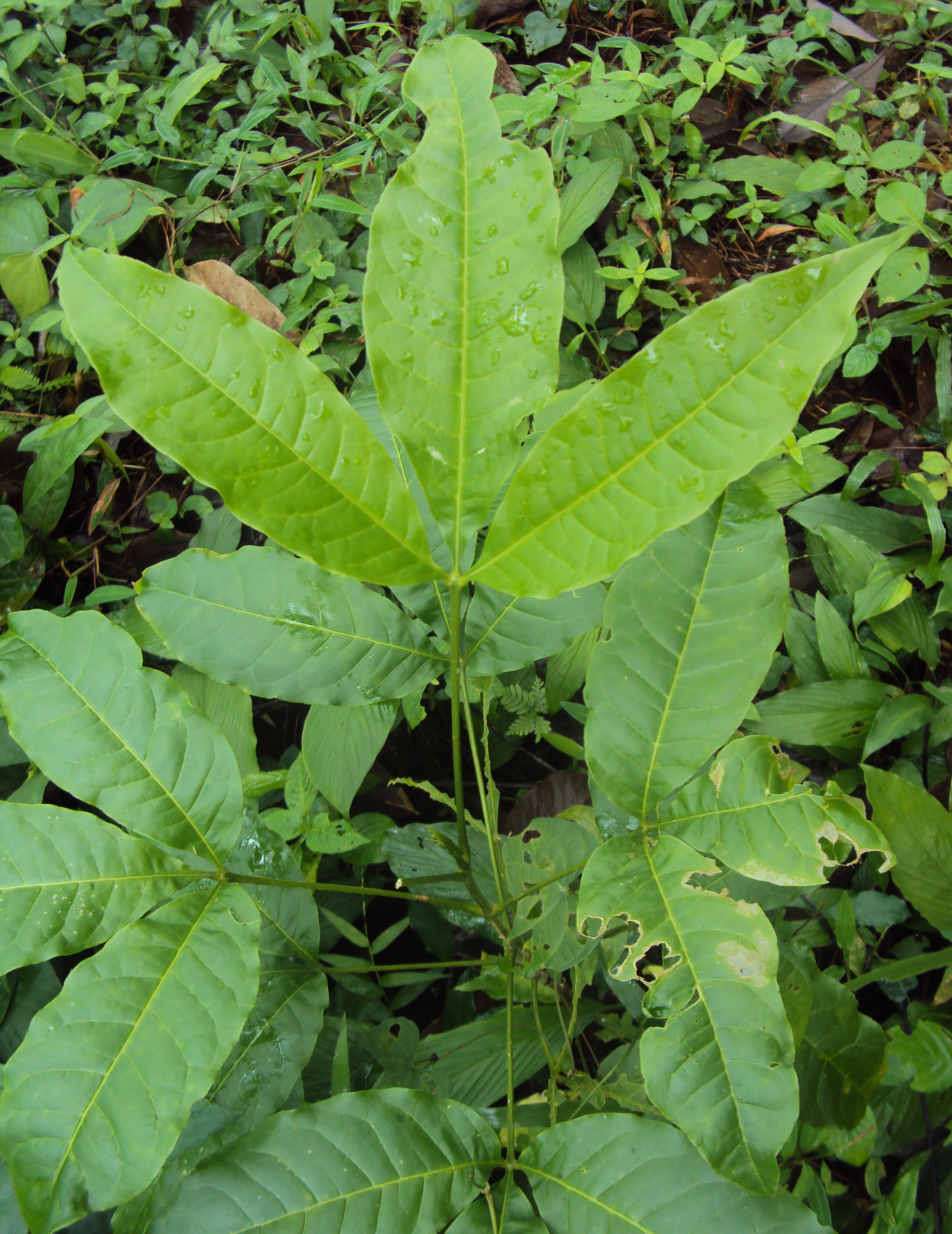

Conservation status
- Least Concern (IUCN 3.1)

Scientific classification
- Kingdom: Plantae
- Clade: Tracheophytes
- Clade: Angiosperms
- Clade: Eudicots
- Clade: Rosids
- Order: Sapindales
- Family: Rutaceae
- Genus: Melicope
- Species: M. lunu-ankenda

Binomial name
- Melicope lunu-ankenda (Gaertn.) T.G.Hartley

Synonyms
- List: Euodia lunu-ankenda (Gaertn.) Merr.; Fagara lunu-ankenda Gaertn.; Ampacus aromatica Kuntze; Ampacus roxburghiana (Cham.) Kuntze; Euodia arborea Elmer; Euodia arborescens D.D.Tao; Euodia concinna Ridl.; Euodia lucida Miq.; Euodia marambong (Miq.) Miq.; Euodia punctata Merr.; Euodia roxburghiana (Cham.) Benth.; Fagara zeylanica J.F.Gmel.; Zanthoxylum marambong Miq.; Zanthoxylum nilagiricum Miq.; Zanthoxylum roxburghianum Cham.; Zanthoxylum zeylanicum (J.F.Gmel.) DC.

= Melicope lunu-ankenda =

Species of flowering plant

Melicope lunu-ankenda, synonym Euodia lunu-ankenda, is a species of plant in the family Rutaceae. It is native to tropical Asia.
