= Amalie Dietrich =

German naturalist, explorer, and collector (1821–1891)

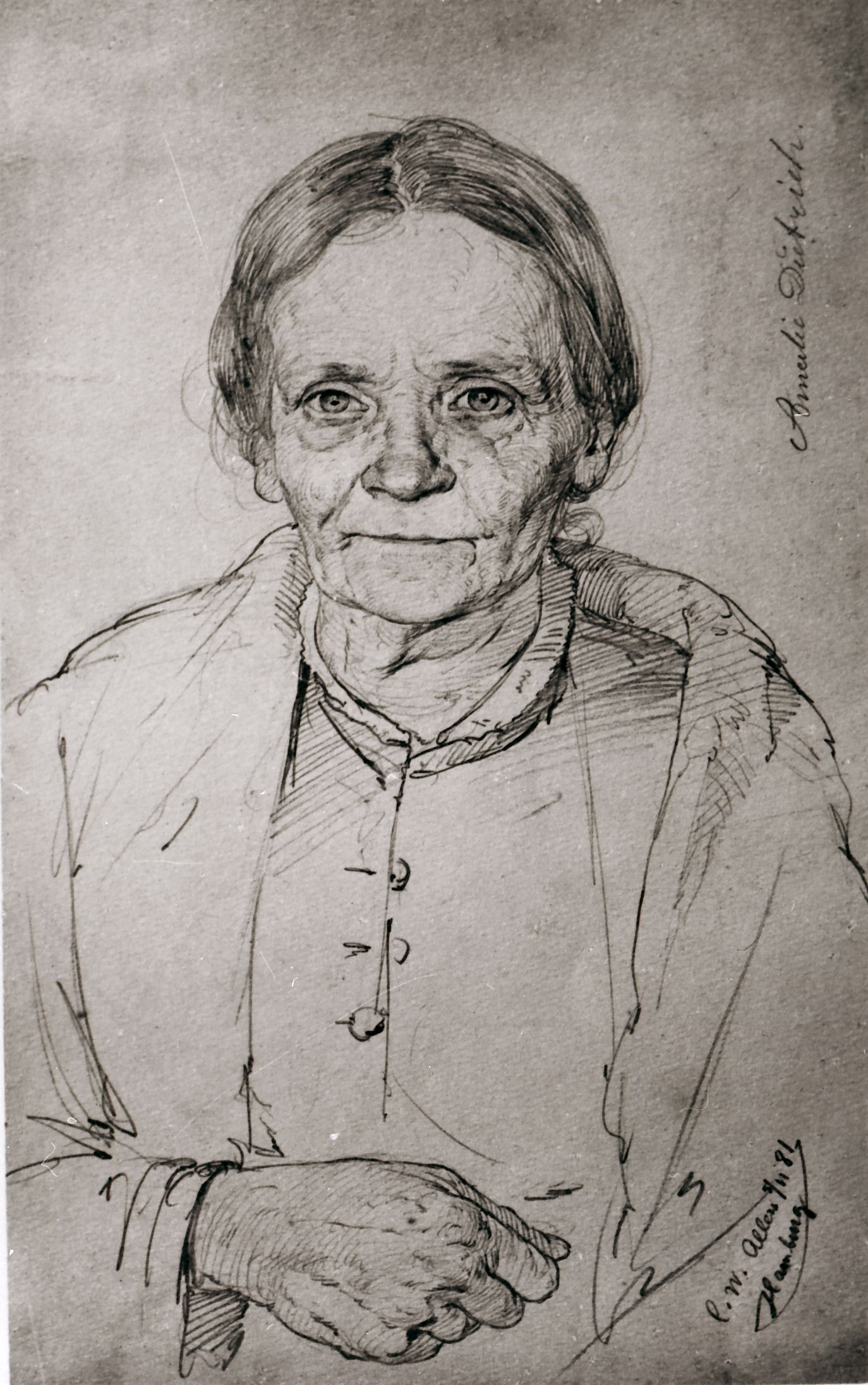
- Amalie Dietrich on her 60th Birthday, (Christian Wilhelm Allers), 1881.
- Born: 26 May 1821; Siebenlehn, Saxony, Germany
- Died: 9 March 1891; Germany
- Other names: 'Angel of Black Death' Koncordie Amalie Dietrich Amalie Nelle
- Occupations: Natural history collector, museum curator, explorer
- Known for: Collecting type specimens for the Godefroy Museum

Koncordie Amalie Dietrich (née Nelle) (26 May 1821 – 9 March 1891) was a German naturalist who was best known for her work in Australia from 1863 to 1872, collecting specimens for the Museum Godeffroy in Hamburg.

== Early life ==
Dietrich was born on 26 May 1821 in Siebenlehn in the Kingdom of Saxony (now in Germany). Her parents were Gottlieb Nelle, a leather-worker, and his wife Cordelia, a herbalist. She attended the local village school in Siebenlehn.

Around 1846, at about age 25, she married Wilhelm August Salomo Dietrich, a chemist and pharmacist who earned a living by collecting botanical and other natural history specimens for sale to collectors and institutions.

In March 1848 their daughter, Charitas Concordia Sophie Dietrich, was born in Siebenlehn.

== Career ==
Following the birth of her daughter, Amalie Dietrich participated in the collection of plants and other natural history material alongside her husband. This work provided practical experience in gathering and preparing botanical specimens.

With no formal training she learnt all she could from her husband about collecting and they planned careers working as naturalists. Between 1845 and 1862 they made a precarious living collecting Alpine specimens to sell to chemists for medicines and to museums for their natural history collections. Some of the delicate alpine flowers she collected in this period can be seen on display in the Natural History Museum in Freiburg. However, the relationship with Willhelm broke down in 1861, when Dietrich discovered that Willhelm was having an extramarital affair.

Dietrich continued her collecting work without Willhelm, and through this came into contact with Johan Cesar Godeffroy, a wealthy merchant, who was seeking to employ collectors for his museum, the Godeffroy Museum. She accepted a ten year contract with him, leaving her daughter in the care of foster parents, and left for Australia on the 17th of May 1863.

=== Australia ===
Dietrich spent the years from 1863 – 1872 in Queensland, Australia where she collected a wide range of species as well as artefacts created by Indigenous Australians, and human remains. She is thought to be the first European to find and collect a Taipan snake while she was there.

Dietrich arrived in Brisbane, Queensland, in August 1863 on the 'La Rochelle'. Her exact route while in Australia remains unknown. She spent 1863 - 1865 in Brisbane. It is known that she spent a year in Rockhampton (early 1866 - early 1867), and then left for Mackay. From 1869 to 1872 she is believed to have been in Bowen.

Dietrich was one of a number of influential German-speaking residents — such as Ludwig Becker, Hermann Beckler, William Blandowski, Wilhelm Haacke, Diedrich Henne, Gerard Krefft, Johann Luehmann, Johann Menge, Carl Mücke (a.k.a. Muecke), Ludwig Preiss, Carl Ludwig Christian Rümker (a.k.a. Ruemker), Moritz Richard Schomburgk, Richard Wolfgang Semon, Karl Theodor Staiger, George Ulrich, Eugene von Guérard, Robert von Lendenfeld, Ferdinand von Mueller, Georg von Neumayer, and Carl Wilhelmi — who brought their "epistemic traditions" to Australia, and not only became "deeply entangled with the Australian colonial project", but also were "intricately involved in imagining, knowing and shaping colonial Australia" (Barrett, et al., 2018, p. 2).

In February of 1872, Dietrich left Australia.

=== Controversy ===
Although her contributions to botanical and zoological specimens is widely lauded, Dietrich's collecting also involved taking Indigenous artifacts, and Indigenous remains, contributing to the violence of the frontier. She contributed to the European trade of human remains, that fueled ideas of racial hierarchies and scientific racism. Additionally, the time in which Dietrich was in Queensland was during a period of violence between Indigenous Australians and the colonial state, with massacres and killing dominating the era. Looting and desecration of Indigenous remains occurred extensively during this period, in both Indigenous burial sites, and the graves of Indigenous people dug by Europeans. Dietrich arrived in Queensland as debates around blackbirding resurfaced.

Whilst in Queensland, Australia, Dietrich "actively sought fresh Aboriginal skeletons for her European clients”. Part of her infamy in Australia comes from stories from the Archer Family, wherein she is alleged to have requested that an employee of the Archer family shoot an First Nations person as a specimen. A similar story was published by Henry Ling Roth in 1908. While there is academic debate on the veracity of this claim, it is widely accepted that Dietrich sent human remains to Hamburg.

From Godeffroy Museum's inventory, Dietrich sent over at least 2 skulls and 8 skeletons. She obtained human remains in Bowen, as well as at least 130 Indigenous items. As Affeldt and Hund state, she 'was part of a political economy of body-snatching, in which human remains were exchanged for money and reputation'.

== Later Life ==
After her return to Hamberg in 1872, she was employed by Godeffroy Museum, but left in 1879 when Godeffroy's went bankrupt. She then begun practicing remedial medicine.

She was a member of the 'German Society of Naturalists and Doctors (Deutsche Gesellschaft für Naturforscher und Ärzte) and the natural history club (Verein für naturwissenschaftliche Unterhaltung zu Hamburg).

After an illness she moved in with her daughter, but died on the 9th of March 1891.

== Legacy ==
A published biography of Amalie Dietrich was written by the author and biographer H. J. Kaeser, a German Jewess who in 1934 fled Nazi Germany to France, Denmark, and finally Sweden. Kaeser became a Swedish citizen and began writing in Swedish.

Dietrich's daughter, Charitas Bischoff, would write a book about her mother's life, which was published in 1909. Bischoff did not have a close relationship with her mother, and had little contact with her. It is also believed that at the time, Bischoff was struggling financially, and thus needed the book to do well. The work was considered inaccurate, and copied from other works, creating a picture that mythologised Dietrich. She would also fabricate letters between herself and her mother. Despite its inaccuracy, the work would be praised in the Weimar Republic as inspirational. This depiction of Dietrich would later be used as propaganda during the German Reich. Several other authors would also cover Dietrich during this period including Gertraud Enderlein, Paul Appel and Elisabeth Langgässer.

== Species ==
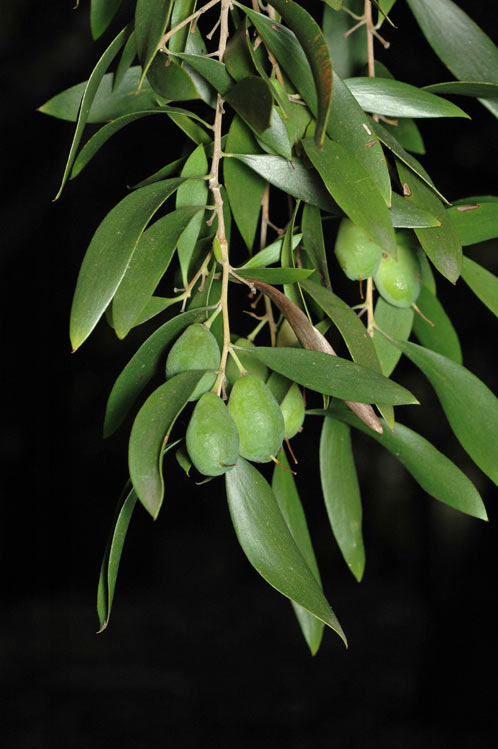
Persoonia amaliae

She collected the type specimens of many species, and in a number of cases the author of the description honoured her in the species epithet (dietrichiae, dietrichiana, amaliae, etc.). Species whose type specimens she collected include:

Aongstroemia dietrichiae Müll.Hal. (1868) – Dicranella dietrichiae (Müll.Hal.) A.Jaeger
Laxmannia illicebrosa Rchb.f. (1871) – a synonym of Laxmannia gracilis R.Br.
Marsdenia hemiptera Rchb. (1871)
Fissidens dietrichiae Müll.Hal. (1872)
Macromitrium sordidevirens Müll.Hal. (1872) – Macromitrium aurescens Hampe
Sargassum aciculare Grunow (1874) – Sargassum filifolium var. aciculare (Grunow) Grunow
Sargassum amaliae Grunow (1874) – accepted
Sargassum godeffroyi Grunow (1874) – accepted
Schoenus elatus Boeck. (1875) – Schoenus falcatus R.Br.
Scirpus dietrichiae Boeck. (1875) – Lipocarpha microcephala (R.Br.) Kunth
Scleria dietrichiae Boeck. (1875) – Scleria levis Retz.
Scleria novae-hollandiae Boeck. (1875) – Scleria laxa R.Br.
Carex dietrichiae Boeck. (1875) – Carex indica L.
Cyperus luerssenii Boeck. (1875) – Cyperus subulatus R.Br.
Acacia dietrichiana F.Muell. (1882)
Barbula subcalycina Mull.Hal. (1882) – (not listed in IPNI, APNI, nor Plants of the world online; listed in AusMoss)
Frullania dietrichana Steph. (1910) – Frullania seriata Gottsche ex Steph.
Indigofera amaliae Domin (1915) – Indigofera polygaloides M.B.Scott
Acacia penninervis var. longiracemosa Domin (1926)
Cryptocarya multicostata Domin (1926) –Cryptocarya hypospodia F.Muell.
Cryptocarya triplinervis var. euryphylla Domin (1926) – Cryptocarya triplinervis R.Br.
Psoralea dietrichiae Domin (1926) – Cullen australasicum (Schltdl.) J.W.Grimes
Swainsona luteola var. dietrichiae Domin (1926) – Swainsona luteola F.Muell.
Tetrastigma nitens var. amaliae Domin (1927) – Tetrastigma nitens (F.Muell.) Planch.
Plectronia coprosmoides var. spathulata O.Swartz (1927) – Cyclophyllum coprosmoides var. spathulatum (O.Schwarz) S.T.Reynolds & R.J.F.Hend.
Premna benthamiana Domin (1928) – Premna serratifolia L.
Hibiscus amaliae Domin (1930) – Hibiscus heterophyllus Vent. (1805)
Mallotus claoxyloides f. grossedentata Domin (1930) – Mallotus ficifolius (Baill.) Pax & K.Hoffm.
Mallotus claoxyloides var. glabratus Domin (1930) – Mallotus claoxyloides (F.Muell.) Müll.Arg.
Pagetia dietrichiae Domin (1930) – Bosistoa medicinalis (F.Muell.) T.G.Hartley
Persoonia amaliae Domin (1930)
Cyperus pumilus var. nervulosus Kuk. (1936) – Cyperus nervulosus (Kük.) S.T.Blake
Helichrysum eriocephalum J.H.Willis (1952)
Nortonia amaliae (a wasp)
Drosera dietrichiana Rchb.f. (1871) – a synonym of Drosera burmanni Vahl (1794)

Current names, synonymy etc based on searches of the Australian Plant Name Index and Plants of the World online. Where no alternative name is given above, the species name is that accepted by either or both of these sources with the exception of the seaweeds.)

== Collections ==
Her collections formed the basis of Zur Flora von Queensland ("On Queensland's Flora", 1875) by Christian Luerssen. While in Australia, she visited Ferdinand von Mueller, and in 1881 Mueller acquired a set of her specimens from Luerssen. (The National Herbarium of Victoria (MEL) holds 2790 of her specimens.) She published nothing in her name, and did not get to choose the names of her specimens. However, her collections continue to be an important resource in herbaria around the world (MEL, B, BM, BRSL, HBG, JE, K, L, MO, P, US, W). As Callum Fisher states, 'the quality of the plant material she gathered distinguished her as a particularly skilled collector'.

== Dietrich Place ==
Dietrich Place in the Canberra suburb of Chisholm is named in recognition of her work in Australia.

== See also ==
- Timeline of women in science
