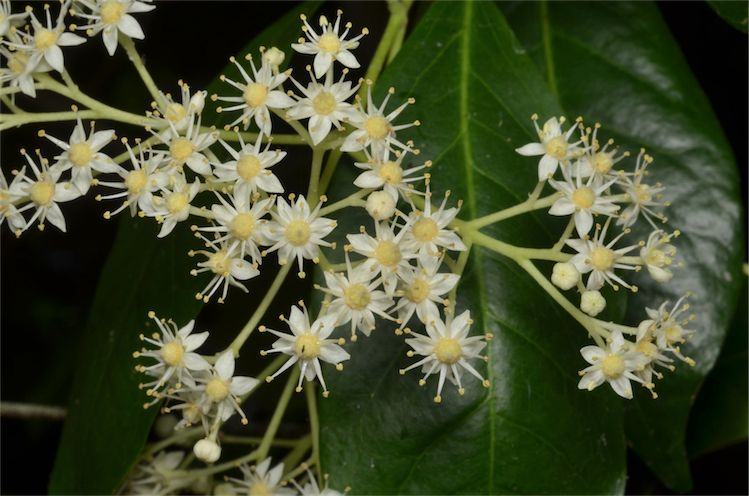

Conservation status
- Vulnerable (EPBC Act)

Scientific classification
- Kingdom: Plantae
- Clade: Tracheophytes
- Clade: Angiosperms
- Clade: Eudicots
- Clade: Rosids
- Order: Sapindales
- Family: Rutaceae
- Genus: Bosistoa
- Species: B. transversa

Binomial name
- Bosistoa transversa J.F.Bailey & C.T.White

Synonyms
- Bosistoa selwynii T.G.Hartley

= Bosistoa transversa =

Yellow satinheart

Species of flowering plant

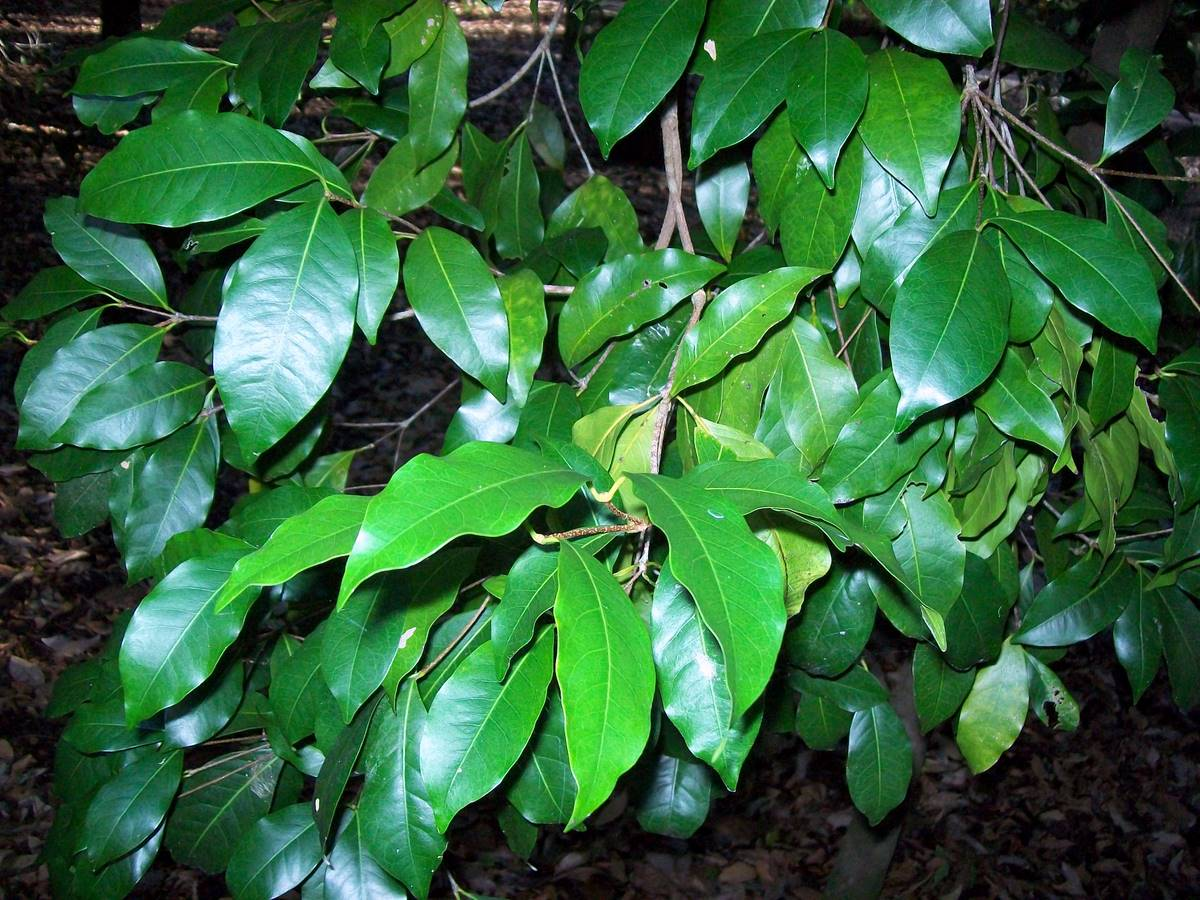
Foliage in Coffs Harbour Botanical Garden

Bosistoa transversa, commonly known as yellow satinheart, or three-leaved bosistoa, is a species of small to medium-sized rainforest tree endemic to eastern Australia. It has mostly pinnate leaves, usually with three leaflets, and panicles of small white flowers.

== Description ==
Bosistoa transversa is a tree that typically grows to a height of 15–22 m (49–72 ft) and has a cylindrical, sometimes crooked trunk. The trunk has a diameter of 8–20 cm (3.1–7.9 in) and has mostly smooth dark brown bark with irregular horizontal ridges. The leaves are arranged in opposite pairs on thin brown or grey-brown branches and are pinnate, 85–160 mm (3.3–6.3 in) long on a petiole 5–30 mm (0.20–1.18 in) long. The leaves usually have three, sometimes up to seven glossy leaflets with prominent oil glands. The leaflets are oblong to elliptical, 40–125 mm (1.6–4.9 in) long and 10–60 mm (0.39–2.36 in) wide, the side leaflets on petiolules 1–5 mm (0.039–0.197 in) long, the end leaflet on a petiolule 5–25 mm (0.20–0.98 in) long. Appearing from January to March, the tiny white flowers are arranged in panicles 70–160 mm (2.8–6.3 in) long, on the ends of branches or in upper leaf axils. The five sepals are about 1 mm (0.039 in) long the five petals broadly elliptical and about 3 mm (0.12 in) long. Flowering occurs from December to May and is followed by pairs of small woody, oval follicles that ripen from May to July.

== Taxonomy ==
Yellow satinheart was first formally described in 1917 by John Frederick Bailey and Cyril Tenison White and the description was published in the Botany Bulletin of the Department of Agriculture, Queensland. The generic name Bosistoa honours the name of Joseph Bosisto, a manufacturer of essential oils. The specific epithet transversa refers to the transversal ribbed carpels of the fruit.

== Distribution and habitat ==
Bosistoa transversa occurs from Mount Larcom in central-eastern Queensland, south to Mullumbimby in north eastern New South Wales. It is found in forest and subtropical rainforest from sea level to an altitude of 500 m (1,600 ft).

== Conservation status ==
The yellow satinheart is classified as vulnerable under the Australian Government Environment Protection and Biodiversity Conservation Act 1999 and in New South Wales under the Biodiversity Conservation Act 2016. The main threats to the species include clearing of rainforests, invasion of remaining rainforest areas by weeds, and grazing by livestock.
