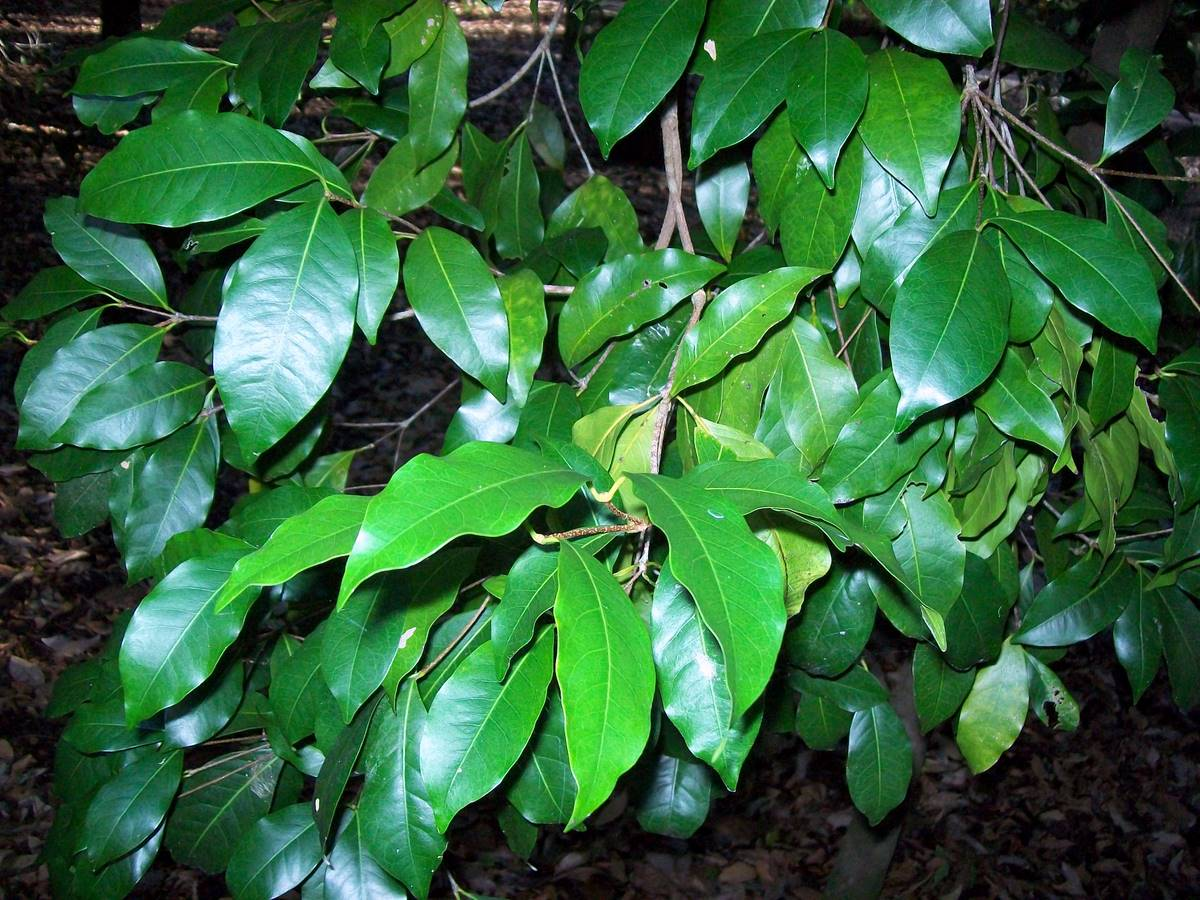
- Bosistoa transversa

Scientific classification
- Kingdom: Plantae
- Clade: Tracheophytes
- Clade: Angiosperms
- Clade: Eudicots
- Clade: Rosids
- Order: Sapindales
- Family: Rutaceae
- Subfamily: Zanthoxyloideae
- Genus: Bosistoa; F.Muell. ex Benth.

Species
- See text.

Synonyms
- Pagetia F.Muell.

= Bosistoa =

Genus of flowering plants

Bosistoa is a genus of four species of tree in the family Rutaceae endemic to eastern Australia. They have simple or compound leaves arranged in opposite pairs and bisexual flowers arranged in panicles, each flower with five sepals, five white petals and ten stamens.

== Description ==
Plants in the genus Bosistoa are trees with simple or compound leaves arranged in opposite pairs and lack domatia. The flowers are bisexual, usually with five sepals fused at the base, sometimes almost for their full length, and five white petals. There are ten stamens that alternate in length. The fruit is a single or pair of follicles joined at the base with a woody exocarp. Each follicle contains a single smooth brown seed.

== Taxonomy ==
The genus Bosistoa was first formally described in 1863 by George Bentham from an unpublished description by Ferdinand von Mueller and the description was published in Flora Australiensis. The name Bosistoa honours the Melbourne pharmacist, Joseph Bosisto.

In 1977, Thomas Hartley described seven species of Bosistoa and five varieties, but from a study of specimens collected since then, the number of accepted species has been reduced and the varieties dispensed with. The species described by Hartley but no longer accepted by the Australian Plant Census are B. brassii, B. monostylis and B. selwynii. Bosistoa brassii is an accepted name in Queensland with B. brassii var. proserpinensis regarded as a synonym of B. medicinalis.

=== Species list ===
- Bosistoa floydii T.G.Hartley - five-leaf bosistoa, five-leaved bonewood (N.S.W.)
- Bosistoa medicinalis (F.Muell.) T.G.Hartley - northern towra, Eumundi bosistoa (Qld.)
- Bosistoa pentacocca (F.Muell.) Baill. - ferny-leaf bosistoa, native almond, union nut (Qld., N.S.W.)
  - Bosistoa pentacocca subsp. connaricarpa (Domin) P.I.Forst.
  - Bosistoa pentacocca (F.Muell.) Baill. subsp. pentacocca
- Bosistoa transversa J.F.Bailey & C.T.White

== Distribution and habitat ==
Trees in the genus Bosistoa are found in rainforest, often dry rainforest and occur in near-coastal areas between tropical north Queensland and northern New South Wales.
