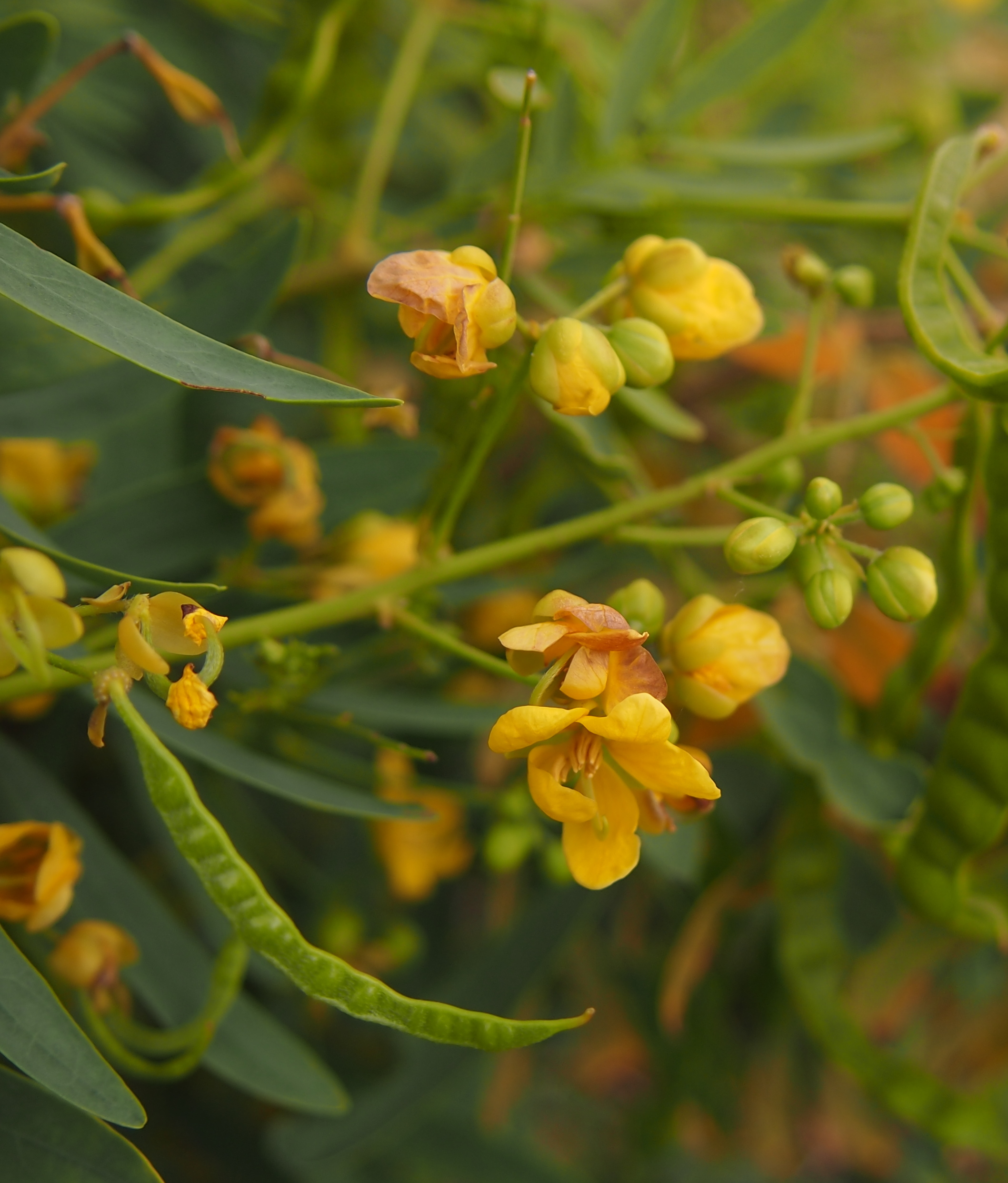

Scientific classification
- Kingdom: Plantae
- Clade: Tracheophytes
- Clade: Angiosperms
- Clade: Eudicots
- Clade: Rosids
- Order: Fabales
- Family: Fabaceae
- Subfamily: Caesalpinioideae
- Genus: Senna
- Species: S. costata

Binomial name
- Senna costata (J.F.Bailey & C.T.White) Randell

Synonyms
- Cassia australis var. glaucescens Benth.; Cassia costata J.F.Bailey & C.T.White; Cassia australis auct. non Sims: Green, J.W. (1985)

= Senna costata =

Species of legume

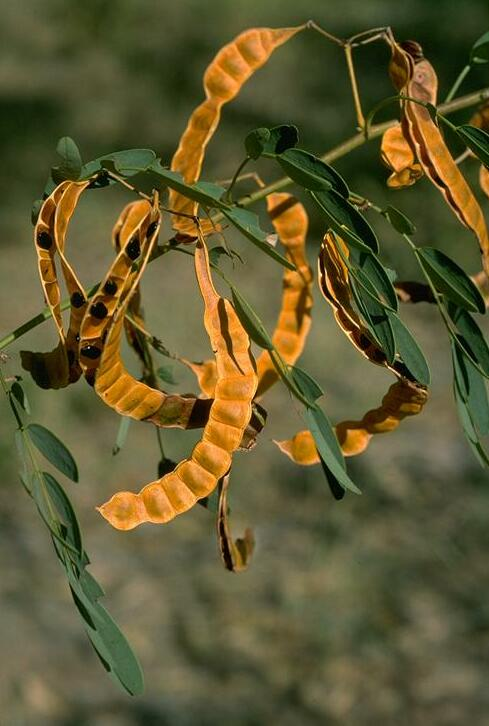
Mature fruit near Prairie, Queensland

Senna costata is a species of flowering plant in the family Fabaceae and is endemic to northern Australia. It is a shrub or small tree with pinnate leaves with four or five pairs of narrowly elliptic leaflets, and yellow flowers arranged in pairs or groups of five to eight, with ten fertile stamens in each flower.

== Description ==
Senna costata is a shrub or small tree that typically grows to a height of 0.6–3 m (2 ft 0 in – 9 ft 10 in), its stems and foliage softly-hairy. The leaves are pinnate, 40–60 mm (1.6–2.4 in) long on a petiole up to 20 mm (0.79 in) long with four or five pairs of narrowly elliptic leaflets 20–40 mm (0.79–1.57 in) long and 3–8 mm (0.12–0.31 in) wide. The flowers are yellow and arranged in upper leaf axils in groups of five to eight on a peduncle 10–15 mm (0.39–0.59 in) long, each flower on a pedicel 10–15 mm (0.39–0.59 in) long. The petals are 7–10 mm (0.28–0.39 in) long and there are ten fertile stamens, the anthers about 3 mm (0.12 in) long. Flowering occurs in winter and spring, and the fruit is a flat pod 70–80 mm (2.8–3.1 in) long, 8–10 mm (0.31–0.39 in) wide and usually curved.

== Taxonomy ==
This species was first formally described in 1915 by John Frederick Bailey and Cyril Tenison White who gave it the name Cassia costata in the Queensland Agricultutal Journal from specimens collected by Ernest Walter Bick near Woolgar, north of Richmond in 1915. In 1989, Barbara Rae Randell reclassified the species as Senna costata in the Journal of the Adelaide Botanic Garden. The specific epithet (costata) means "ribbed", referring to the stems of this species.

== Distribution and habitat ==
Senna costata grows on pindan plains in grassy woodland in northern Western Australia, the Northern Territory and northern Queensland.
