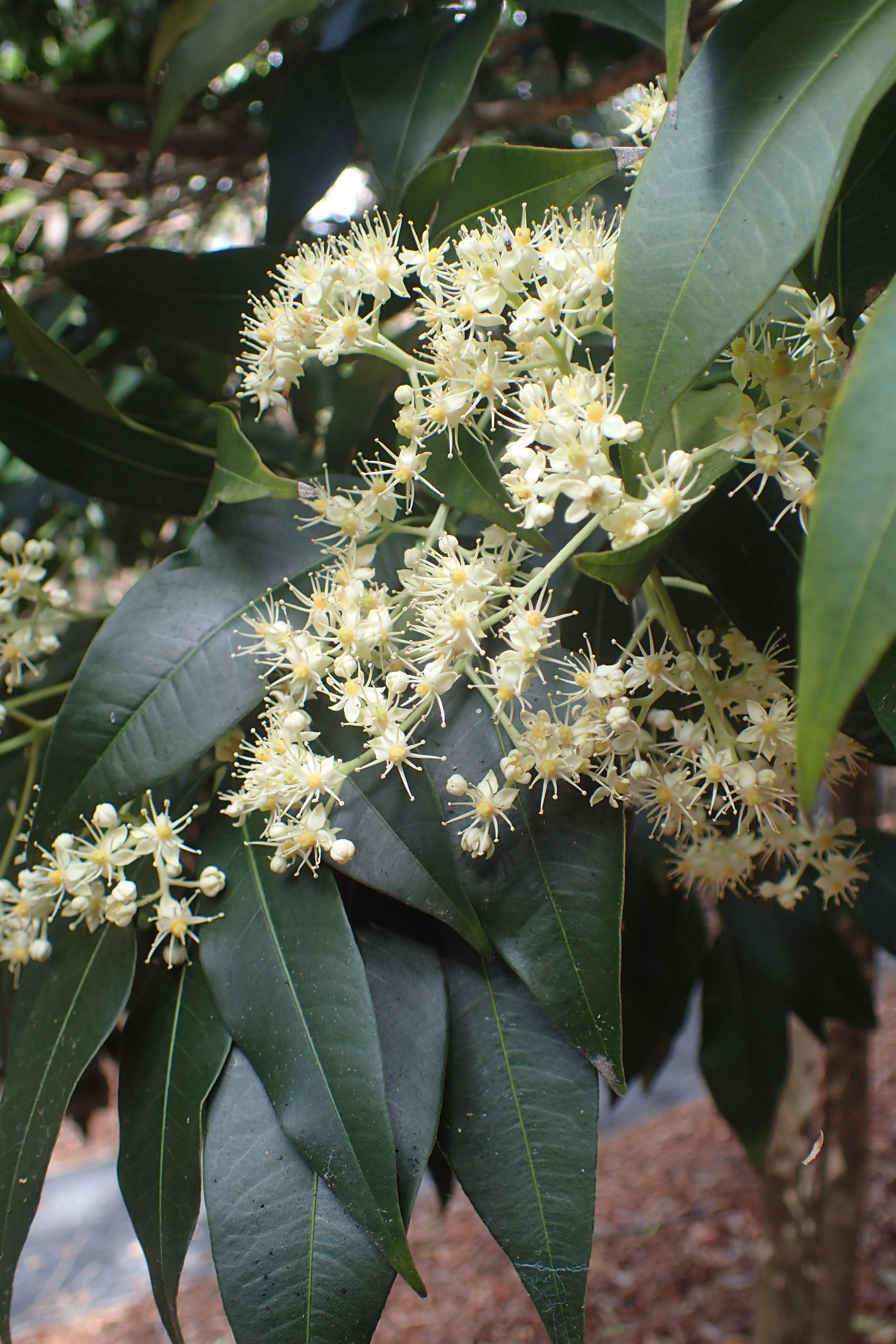

Scientific classification
- Kingdom: Plantae
- Clade: Tracheophytes
- Clade: Angiosperms
- Clade: Eudicots
- Clade: Rosids
- Order: Sapindales
- Family: Rutaceae
- Genus: Bosistoa
- Species: B. floydii

Binomial name
- Bosistoa floydii T.G.Hartley

= Bosistoa floydii =

Five-leaf bosistoa

Species of tree

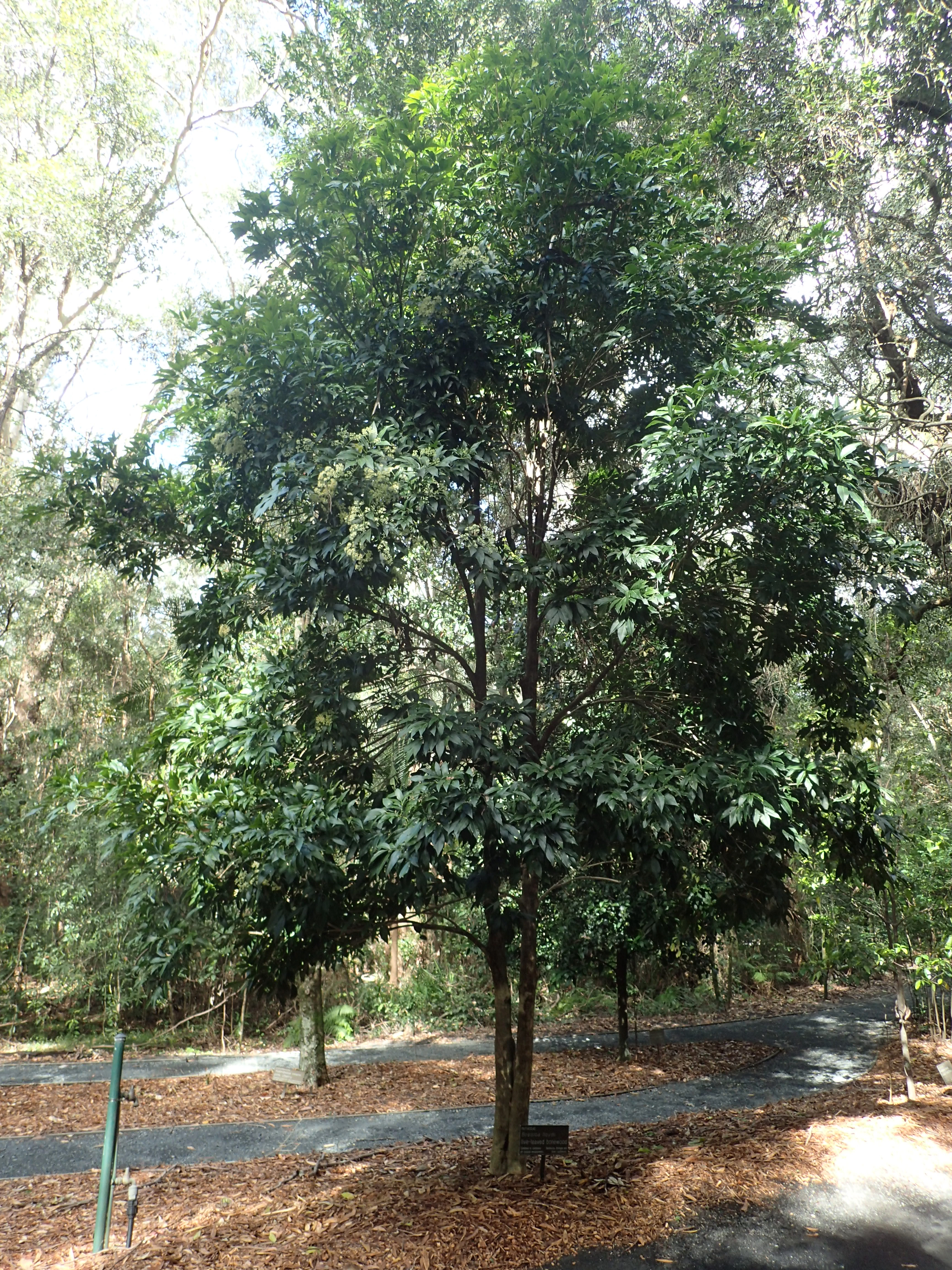
Habit in Coffs Harbour Botanic Garden

Bosistoa floydii, commonly known as the five-leaf bosistoa or five-leaved bonewood, is a species of small rainforest tree that is endemic to north-eastern New South Wales. It has pinnate leaves usually with five elliptic leaflets, and panicles of tiny, creamy white flowers.

== Description ==
Bosistoa floydii grows as a small tree that may reach 15–20 m (49–66 ft) high and has a spreading crown. The trunk is buttressed and can reach a diameter of 75 cm (30 in), and the bark is grey. The leaves are arranged in opposite pairs on thick green or fawn branches and are pinnate, 110–280 mm (4.3–11.0 in) long on a petiole 20–50 mm (0.8–2 in) long. There are three to seven, usually five glossy elliptical leaflets, each 65–160 mm (2.6–6.3 in) long and 15–35 mm (0.6–1 in) wide on a petiolule 5–25 mm (0.2–1 in) long. The leaflets have prominent oli glands and a pointed tip. Appearing in October and November, the tiny flowers are arranged in panicles up to 200 mm (7.9 in) long. Each flower has five hairy sepals about 1 mm (0.04 in) long and five oval, white or creamy white petals 4–5 mm (0.16–0.20 in) long. Flowering is followed by one, or rarely two small, warty, woody, yellow-brown fruit that ripen in February.

== Taxonomy ==
Bosistoa floydii was first described in 1977 by Thomas Gordon Hartley, who published the description in the Journal of the Arnold Arboretum. The generic name Bosistoa honours the name of Joseph Bosisto, a manufacturer of essential oils. The specific epithet floydii honours the eminent Australian rainforest botanist Alexander Floyd.

== Distribution and habitat ==
Five-leaf bosistoa is restricted to subtropical rainforest in the Bellinger and Orara River areas in north-eastern New South Wales, where it grows on basalt or rich alluvial soils.
