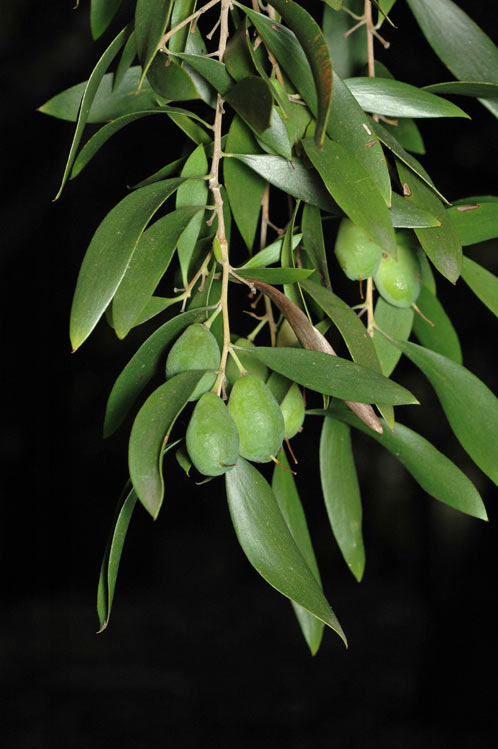

Scientific classification
- Kingdom: Plantae
- Clade: Tracheophytes
- Clade: Angiosperms
- Clade: Eudicots
- Order: Proteales
- Family: Proteaceae
- Genus: Persoonia
- Species: P. amaliae

Binomial name
- Persoonia amaliae Domin
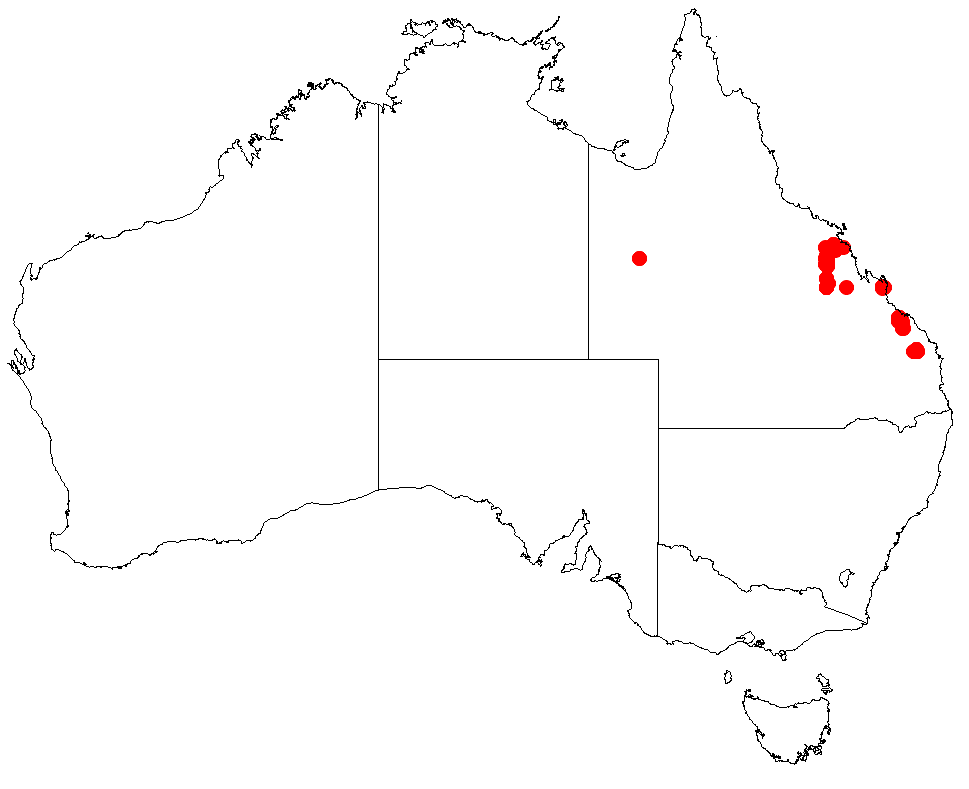
- Occurrence data from Australasian Virtual Herbarium

= Persoonia amaliae =

Species of flowering plant

Persoonia amaliae is a species of flowering plant in the family Proteaceae and is endemic to Queensland. It is a shrub or small tree with hairy young branches, spatula-shaped to lance-shaped leaves and yellow flowers in groups of up to eleven.

== Description ==
Persoonia amaliae is a shrub or tree that typically grows to a height of 2–8 m (6 ft 7 in – 26 ft 3 in) and has fissured bark near the base and smooth bark above. Young branchlets and leaves have greyish to light brown hairs. The leaves are spatula-shaped or narrow elliptic to lance-shaped, 30–80 mm (1.2–3.1 in) long and 6–18 mm (0.24–0.71 in) wide. The flowers are borne in groups of up to eleven on stalks up to 40 mm (1.6 in) long on branches that continue to grow after flowering. Each flower is on a hairy pedicel 3–9 mm (0.12–0.35 in) long, the tepals yellow and 10–13 mm (0.39–0.51 in) long. Flowering occurs from January to July.

== Taxonomy ==
Persoonia amaliae was first formally described in 1921 by Karel Domin in Bibliotheca Botanica from specimens collected by Amalie Dietrich.

== Distribution and habitat ==
This persoonia grows in forest on near-coastal ranges at altitudes of 150 to 700 m (490 to 2,300 ft), mainly between Eungella and Biggenden.

== Conservation status ==
Persoonia amaliae is listed as of "least concern" under the Queensland Government Nature Conservation Act 1992.
