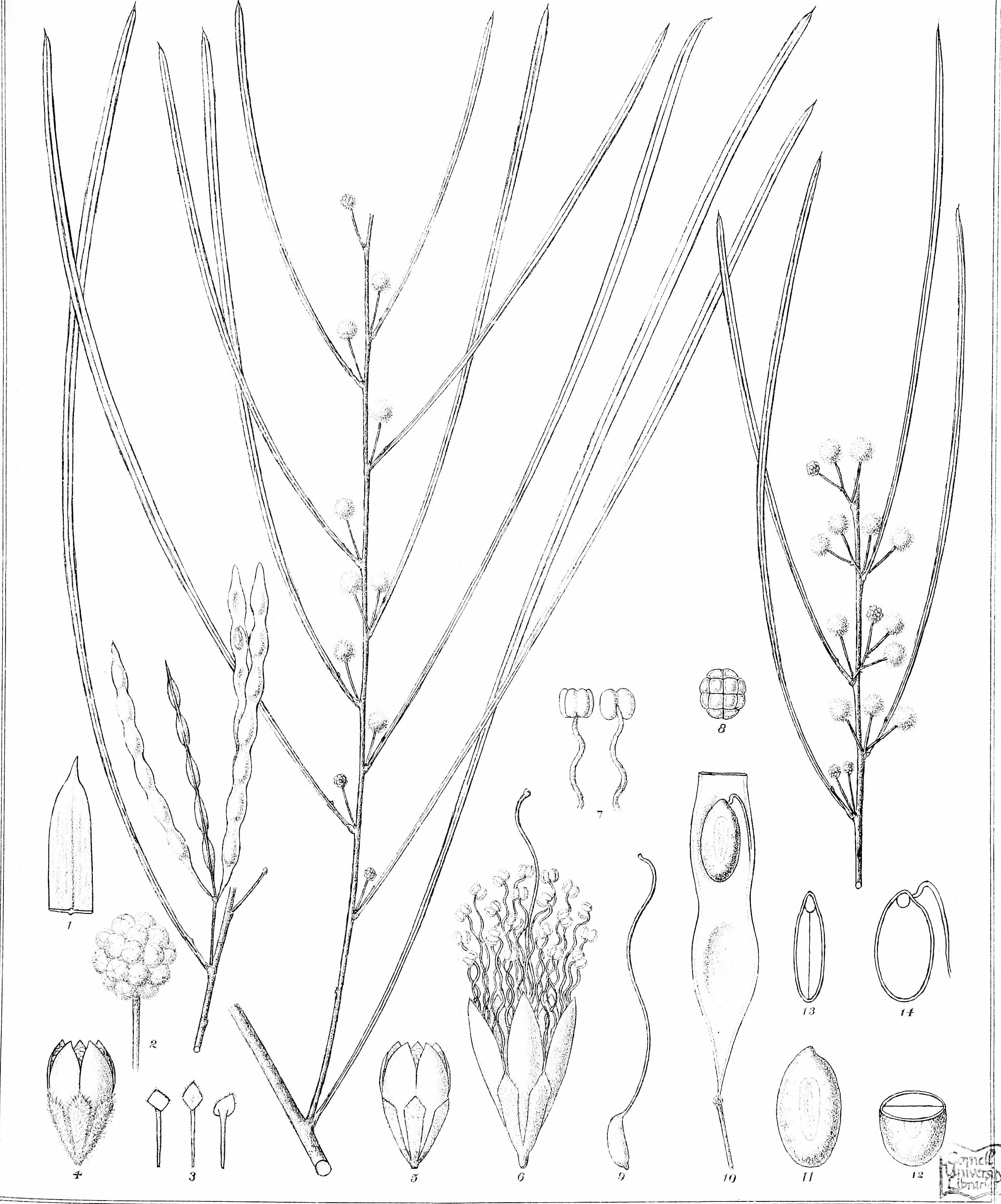
- Sketch of A. dietrichina from Iconography of Australian species of Acacia and cognate genera

Scientific classification
- Kingdom: Plantae
- Clade: Tracheophytes
- Clade: Angiosperms
- Clade: Eudicots
- Clade: Rosids
- Order: Fabales
- Family: Fabaceae
- Subfamily: Caesalpinioideae
- Clade: Mimosoid clade
- Genus: Acacia
- Species: A. dietrichiana

Binomial name
- Acacia dietrichiana F.Muell.
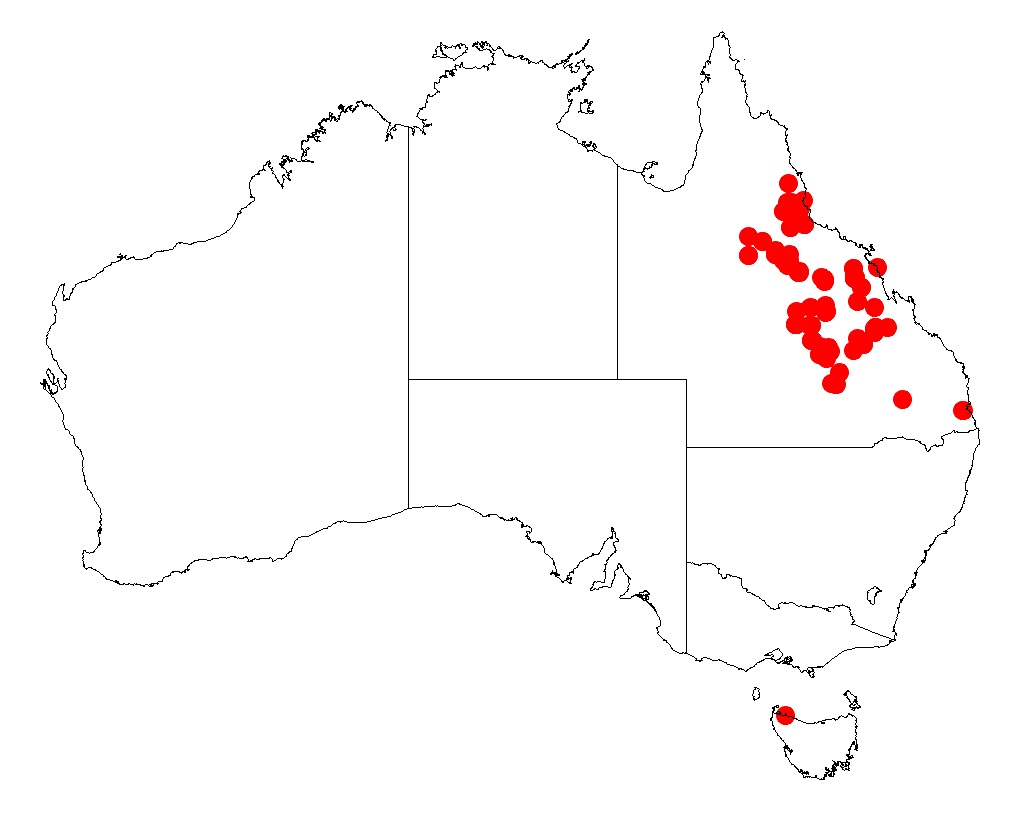
- Occurrence data from AVH

Synonyms
- Acacia juncifolia var. planifolia Benth.; Racosperma dietrichianum (F.Muell.) Pedley

= Acacia dietrichiana =

Dietrich wattle

Species of legume

Acacia dietrichiana is a species of flowering plant in the family Fabaceae and is endemic to Queensland in Australia. It is a shrub or tree with narrowly linear phyllodes, spherical heads of bright golden yellow flowers and thinly leathery pods that resemble a string of beads.

== Description ==
Acacia dietrichiana is a sparingly branched shrub or tree that typically grows to a height of up to 6 m (20 ft) and has slender, dark reddish brown branchlets. Its phyllodes are narrowly linear, straight to slightly curved, 130–230 mm (5.1–9.1 in) long and 1.5–5 mm (0.059–0.197 in) wide with a single vein and a gland up to 6 mm (0.24 in) above the base of the phyllode. The flowers are borne in up to three spherical heads in axils on a peduncle 8–11 mm (0.31–0.43 in) long, each head with 20 to 30 bright golden yellow flowers. The pods are thinly leathery, up to 60 mm (2.4 in) long and 4–5 mm (0.16–0.20 in) wide and resemble a string of beads. The seeds are about 4 mm (0.16 in) long and lack an aril.

== Taxonomy ==
Acacia dietrichiana was first formally described in 1882 by Ferdinand von Mueller in Southern Science Record from specimens collected by Amalie Dietrich near Lake Elphinstone.

== Distribution and habitat ==
This species of wattle grows in woodland in soils derived from sandstone, and is widespread but uncommon in central Queensland from east of Tambo and along the Great Dividing Range to Lucy Creek (west of Ingham).

== Conservation status ==
Acacia dietrichiana is listed as of "least concern" under the Queensland Government Nature Conservation Act 1992.

== See also ==
- List of Acacia species
