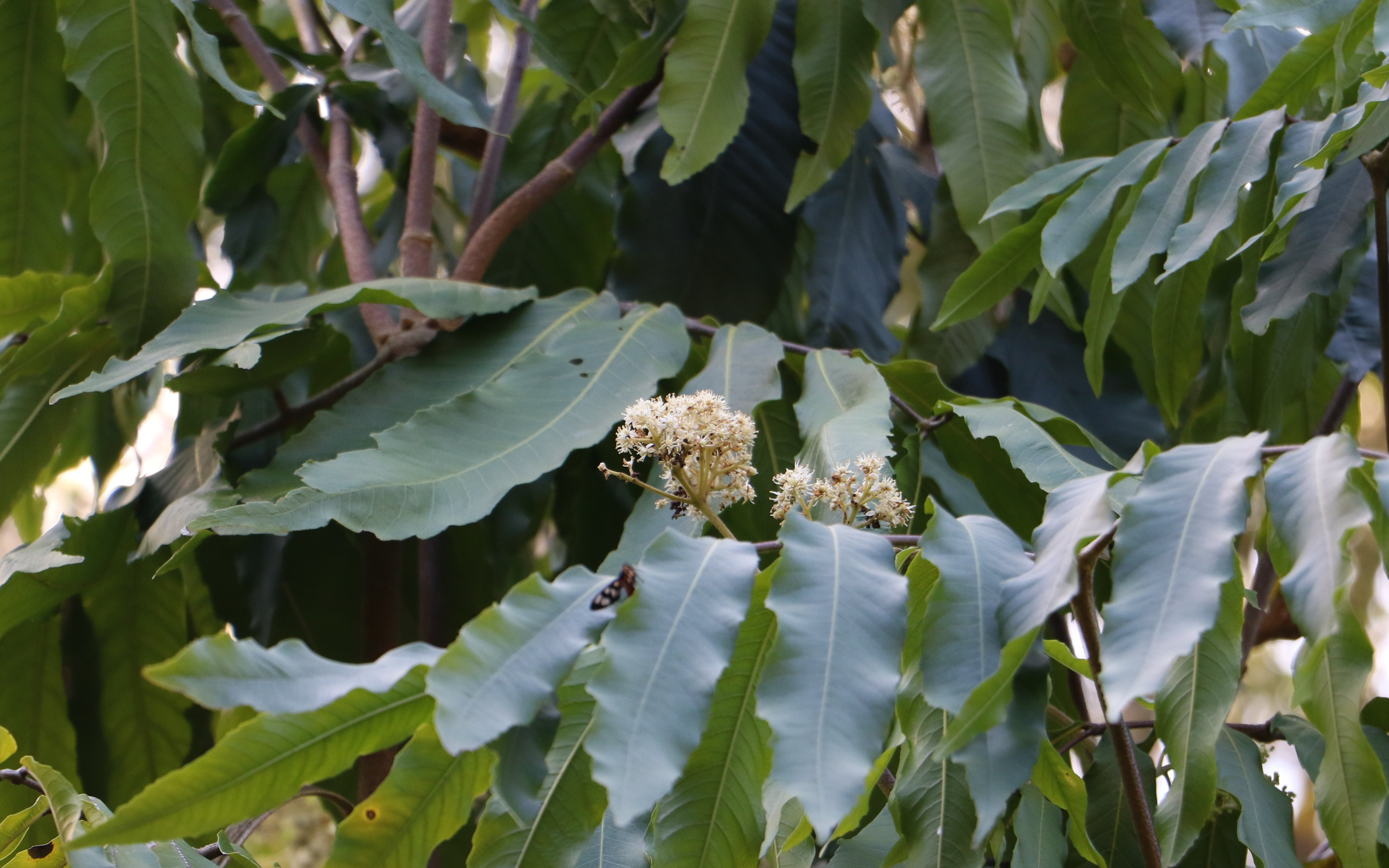

Scientific classification
- Kingdom: Plantae
- Clade: Tracheophytes
- Clade: Angiosperms
- Clade: Eudicots
- Clade: Rosids
- Order: Sapindales
- Family: Rutaceae
- Genus: Bosistoa
- Species: B. pentacocca

Binomial name
- Bosistoa pentacocca (F.Muell.) Baill.

= Bosistoa pentacocca =

Ferny-leaf bosistoa

Species of flowering plant

Bosistoa pentacocca, commonly known as ferny-leaf bosistoa, native almond or union nut, is a species of tree that is endemic to eastern Australia. It has pinnate leaves arranged in opposite pairs with between three and thirteen leaflets and panicles of small flowers arranged in leaf axils or on the ends of branches. It grows along streams in rainforest.

== Description ==
Bosistoa pentacocca is a tree that typically grows to a height of about 18 m (59 ft). It has grey, blotchy and scaly bark and pinkish-red new growth. The leaves are pinnate, 140–450 mm (5.5–17.7 in) long on a petiole 30–80 mm (1.2–3.1 in) long and there are between three and thirteen elliptical to lance-shaped leaflets. The leaflets are 45–270 mm (1.8–10.6 in) long and 15–90 mm (0.59–3.54 in) wide, the side leaflets sessile or with a petiolule up to 8 mm (0.31 in) long and the end leaflet sessile or on a petiolule up to 40 mm (1.6 in) long. The flowers are 50–330 mm (2.0–13.0 in) long and arranged in panicles in leaf axils or on the ends of branchlets. The sepals are about 1 mm (0.039 in) long and joined for most of their length, the petals 3.5–4.5 mm (0.14–0.18 in) long. Flowering occurs from January to February and the fruit is a follice 18–30 mm (0.71–1.18 in) long and 15–30 mm (0.59–1.18 in) wide containing a single seed 10–20 mm (0.39–0.79 in) long.

== Taxonomy ==
Ferny-leaf bosistoa was first formally described in1862 by Ferdinand von Mueller who gave it the name Euodia pentacocca and published the description in Fragmenta phytographiae Australiae.

In 1873, Henri Ernest Baillon changed the name to Bosistoa pentacocca in his book Histoire des Plantes.

In 2013, Paul Irwin Forster describe two subspecies and the names have been accepted by the Australian Plant Census:

- Bosistoa pentacocca subsp. connaricarpa Domin P.I.Forst. that has leaves with between three and five, rarely seven leaflets;
- Bosistoa pentacocca (F.Muell.) Baill. subsp. pentacocca that has leaves with between seven and thirteen leaflets.

== Distribution and habitat ==
Bosistoa pentacocca grows along streams in rainforest, often dry rainforest and occurs between Bowen in eastern-central Queensland and the Clarence River in north-eastern New South Wales. Subspecies connaricarpa has a more limited distribution between Dryander and Gympie.
