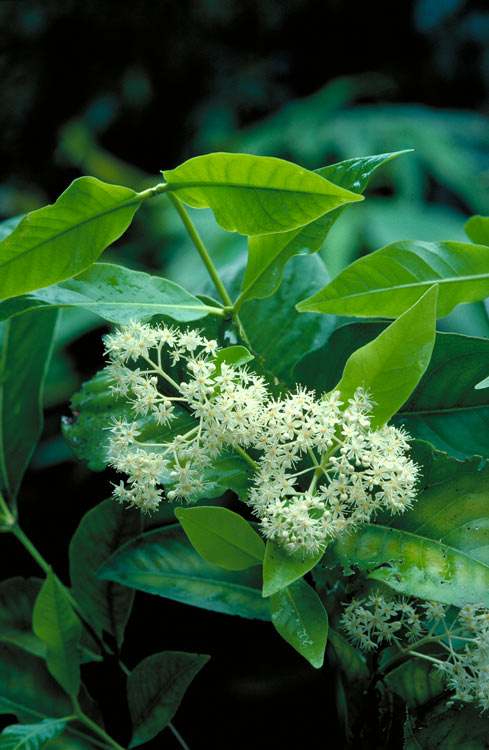

Scientific classification
- Kingdom: Plantae
- Clade: Tracheophytes
- Clade: Angiosperms
- Clade: Eudicots
- Clade: Rosids
- Order: Sapindales
- Family: Rutaceae
- Genus: Bosistoa
- Species: B. medicinalis

Binomial name
- Bosistoa medicinalis (F.Muell.)T.G.Hartley

Synonyms
- Bosistoa brassii T.G.Hartley; Bosistoa brassii T.G.Hartley var. brassii; Bosistoa brassii var. proserpinensis T.G.Hartley; Bosistoa monostylis (F.M.Bailey) T.G.Hartley; Pagetia dietrichiae Domin; Pagetia medicinalis F.Muell.; Pagetia monostylis F.M.Bailey

= Bosistoa medicinalis =

Northern towra

Species of flowering plant

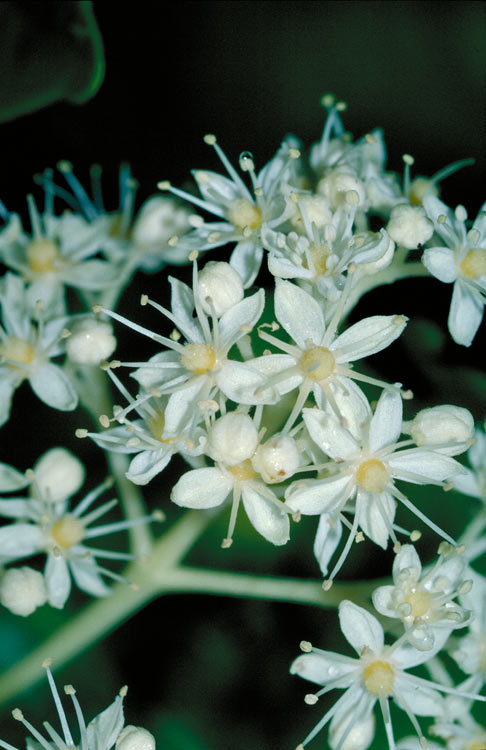
Flower detail

Bosistoa medicinalis, commonly known as the northern towra or Eumundi bosistoa, is a species of small to medium-sized rainforest tree that is endemic to Queensland. It has simple and pinnate leaves with two or three leaflets and panicles of small white flowers.

== Description ==
Bosistoa medicinalis is a tree that typically grows to a height of bout 20 m (66 ft) high and has hard bark. The leaves are arranged in opposite pairs and are usually trifoliate, 70–180 mm (2.8–7.1 in) long on a petiole 10–15 mm (0.39–0.59 in) long. The leaves are sometimes simple or have two leaflets, but there are usually three egg-shaped leaflets, each 35–140 mm (1.4–5.5 in) long and 10–55 mm (0.39–2.17 in) wide, the end leaflet on a petiolule 3–17 mm (0.12–0.67 in) long. Simple leaves are 50–190 mm (2.0–7.5 in) long. The leaflets have prominent oil glands and a pointed tip. Each twig ends with two simple leaves and a terminal bud. The flowers are borne in panicles 50–100 mm (2.0–3.9 in) long, the sepals 0.5–1 mm (0.020–0.039 in) long and joined at the base, the petals 3–4.5 mm (0.12–0.18 in) long. Flowering occurs from February to October and the fruit is an oval to spherical follicle 9–12 mm (0.35–0.47 in) long, maturing from October to March. The seeds are oval to kidney-shaped, about 8 mm (0.31 in) long.

== Taxonomy ==
Northern towra was first formally described in 1866 by Ferdinand von Mueller who gave it the name Pagetia medicinalis and published the description in Fragmenta phytographiae Australiae. In 1977, Thomas Gordon Hartley changed the name to Bosistoa medicinalis in the Journal of the Arnold Arboretum.

== Distribution and habitat ==
Bosistoa medicinalis grows in rainforest, often dry rainforest in near-coastal areas between the Pascoe River in northern Queensland to Woombye in south-eastern Queensland.

== Conservation status ==
This species is listed as of "least concern" under the Queensland Government Nature Conservation Act 1992.
