= Frederick Manson Bailey =

Australian botanist (1827–1915)

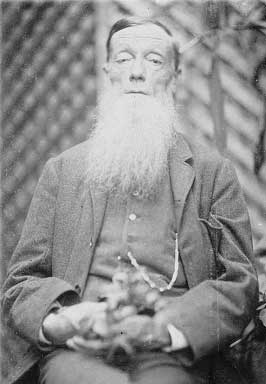
- Frederick Manson Bailey
- Born: 8 March 1827; London, United Kingdom of Great Britain and Ireland
- Died: 25 June 1915 (aged 88); Kangaroo Point, Brisbane, Australia
- Resting place: South Brisbane Cemetery
- Spouse: Anna Maria Bailey
- Awards: Clarke Medal (1902)
- Scientific career
- Fields: Botany, Horticulture
- Institutions: Queensland Museum
- Author abbrev. (botany): F.M.Bailey

Frederick Manson Bailey CMG (8 March 1827 – 25 June 1915) was an Australian botanist who made valuable contributions to the characterisation of the flora of Queensland. He was known by his middle name, Manson. The standard author abbreviation F.M.Bailey is used to indicate this person as the author when citing a botanical name.

== Early life ==
Frederick Manson Bailey was born in London, the second son of John Bailey. The Bailey family were nurserymen and seedsmen for many years in London, sometimes connected with Loddiges nurseries. Frederick was educated at the foundation school of the Independent Church at Hackney, London. The family went to Australia in 1838 arriving at Adelaide in March 1839 where John was appointed as colonial botanist by the governor, George Gawler, and started to form the Adelaide Botanic Garden. John Bailey held the position of colonial botanist until 1841.

== Career ==
In 1856, Manson married Anna Maria, eldest daughter of the Rev. Thomas Waite, and in 1858, went to New Zealand and took up land in the Hutt Valley, but left there in 1861 left for New South Wales owing to the New Zealand Wars. In the same year, Bailey went to Queensland and collected plants is various parts of the state, and contributed articles on plant life generally. His first important publication was Handbook of Queensland Ferns published in 1874 and An Illustrated Monograph of the Grasses of Queensland with Karl Staiger.

In 1880, Manson Bailey collaborated with Julian Tenison-Woods in publishing a Census of the Flora of Brisbane, and in 1881 was appointed Queensland colonial botanist.

Bailey travelled widely, important expeditions included Rockingham Bay, Seaview Range and the upper Herbert River (1873), western Queensland, Roma and Rockhampton (1876), Cairns and the Barron River (1877), Mount Bellenden Ker (1889), Georgina River (1895), Torres Strait (1897) and British New Guinea (1898). Bailey was awarded the Clarke Medal of the Royal Society of New South Wales in 1902, and was created C.M.G. (Companion of the Order of St Michael and St George) in 1911. Bailey died on 25 June 1915 at Kangaroo Point, Brisbane. He is buried in South Brisbane Cemetery.

== Legacy ==
Around 50 species of plants have been named after him, including Acacia baileyana and Grevillea baileyana. A son, John Frederick Bailey, who survived him, was director of the Brisbane and then Adelaide botanic gardens and Cyril Tenison White, government botanist of Queensland was his grandson and a pupil-assistant in 1905.

== Other sources ==
- Australian National Botanic Garden; Bailey, Frederick M. (1827–1915)

Awards
Preceded by Edward John Eyre	Clarke Medal; 1902	Succeeded by Alfred William Howitt
