= Cyperus nervulosus =

Scientific classification
- Kingdom: Plantae
- Clade: Tracheophytes
- Clade: Angiosperms
- Clade: Monocots
- Clade: Commelinids
- Order: Poales
- Family: Cyperaceae
- Genus: Cyperus
- Species: C. nervulosus

Binomial name
- Cyperus nervulosus (Kük.) S.T.Blake

Species of plant

Cyperus nervulosus is a sedge of the family Cyperaceae that is native to Australia.

The annual sedge typically grows to a height of 0.03 to 0.2 metres (0.10 to 0.66 ft) and has a tufted habit. It blooms between February and July and produces green-brown flowers.

In Western Australia it is found around swamps and pools in the Kimberley region where it grows in sandy-clay soils.

== See also ==
- List of Cyperus species
