= Cyperus subulatus =

Pointed flat-sedge

Scientific classification
- Kingdom: Plantae
- Clade: Tracheophytes
- Clade: Angiosperms
- Clade: Monocots
- Clade: Commelinids
- Order: Poales
- Family: Cyperaceae
- Genus: Cyperus
- Species: C. subulatus

Binomial name
- Cyperus subulatus R.Br.

Species of plant endemic to Australia

Cyperus subulatus, commonly known as the pointed flat-sedge, is a species of sedge that is endemic to eastern Australia.

The perennial sedge has a short rhizome with smooth culms, with a triangular cross-section, that are swollen toward the base. These culms have a height of about 50 cm (20 in) with a diameter of about 1.5 mm (0.059 in).

The species was first formally described by the botanist Robert Brown in 1810.

It is mostly found in Queensland and New South Wales as well as Victoria. It grows well in coastal dune habitats and sometime in open sandy areas further inland and in open woodlands.

== See also ==
- List of Cyperus species
