= Swainsona luteola =

Scientific classification
- Kingdom: Plantae
- Clade: Tracheophytes
- Clade: Angiosperms
- Clade: Eudicots
- Clade: Rosids
- Order: Fabales
- Family: Fabaceae
- Subfamily: Faboideae
- Genus: Swainsona
- Species: S. luteola

Binomial name
- Swainsona luteola F.Muell.

Synonyms
- Swainsona luteola var. dietrichiae Domin; Swainsona luteola F.Muell. var. luteola; Swainsona luteola var. typica Domin nom. inval.; Swainsonia luteola F.Muell. orth. var.

Species of legume

Swainsona luteola, commonly known as dwarf Darling pea, is a species of flowering plant in the family Fabaceae and is endemic to the eastern Australia. It is a prostrate or low-lying to semi-erect perennial with imparipinnate leaves with usually 3 to 17 narrowly elliptic leaflets, and racemes of 5 to 15 purple, sometimes yellow flowers.

== Description ==
Swainsona luteola is a prostrate or low-lying to semi-erect perennial plant, that typically grows to a height of up to about 50 cm (20 in) and has hairy stems. The leaves are imparipinnate, mostly 30–100 mm (1.2–3.9 in) long with 3 to 17 narrowly elliptic leaflets, the side leaflets 5–20 mm (0.20–0.79 in) long and 3–10 mm (0.12–0.39 in) wide with stipules 2–5 mm (0.079–0.197 in) long at the base of the petioles. The flowers are purple, sometimes yellow, 6–8 mm (0.24–0.31 in) long, arranged in racemes of 5 to 15, 10–80 mm (0.39–3.15 in) long, on a peduncle 0.5–1.5 mm (0.020–0.059 in) long. The sepals are joined at the base to form a tube 1.5–2.0 mm (0.059–0.079 in) long, with lobes equal to or longer than the tube. The standard petal is 6–9 mm (0.24–0.35 in) long and 5–8 mm (0.20–0.31 in) wide, the wings 3–5 mm (0.12–0.20 in) long and the keel 5–8.5 mm (0.20–0.33 in) long and about 2 mm (0.079 in) deep. The fruit is a narrowly elliptic pod 20–35 mm (0.79–1.38 in) long and 3–8 mm (0.12–0.31 in) wide, with the remains of the curved style 1.0–1.25 mm (0.039–0.049 in) long.

== Taxonomy and naming ==
Swainsona luteola was first formally described in 1859 by Ferdinand von Mueller in his Fragmenta Phytographiae Australiae from specimens collected near Peak Downs. The specific epithet (luteola) means "yellowish".

== Distribution ==
This species of swainsona grows in heavy soils in open grassland on the western slopes and plains of New South Wales and in south-eastern Queensland mostly west of the Great Dividing Range.
