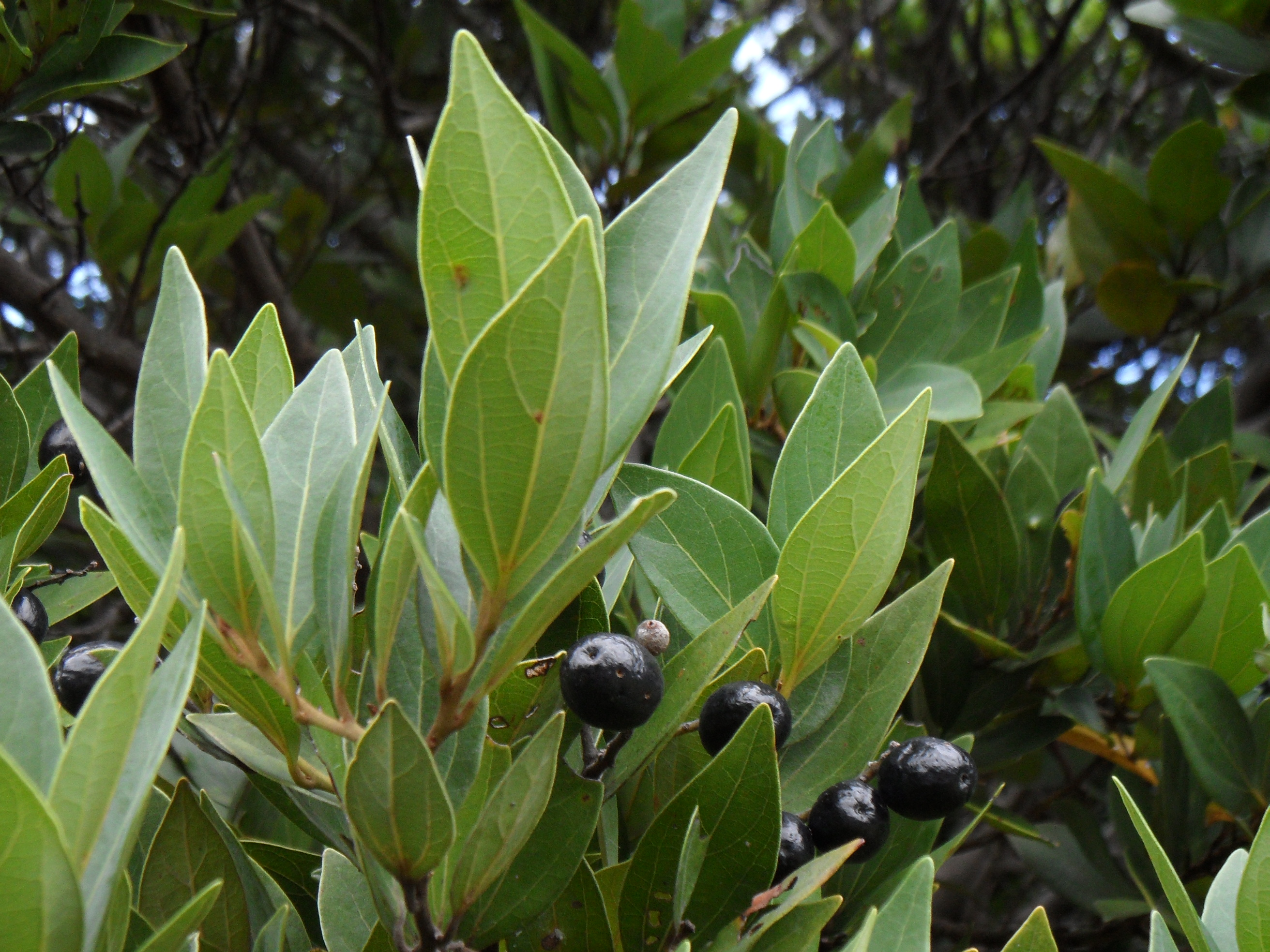
- Fruit and leaves, Lord Howe Island

Conservation status
- Least Concern (IUCN 3.1)

Scientific classification
- Kingdom: Plantae
- Clade: Tracheophytes
- Clade: Angiosperms
- Clade: Magnoliids
- Order: Laurales
- Family: Lauraceae
- Genus: Cryptocarya
- Species: C. triplinervis

Binomial name
- Cryptocarya triplinervis R.Br.

Varieties
- Cryptocarya triplinervis var. pubens B.Hyland; Cryptocarya triplinervis var. riparia B.Hyland; Cryptocarya triplinervis var. triplinervis

Synonyms
- Cryptocarya triplinervia Spreng. orth. var.; synonyms of var. triplinervis: Caryodaphne browniana Nees; Caryodaphne browniana var. ferruginea Meisn.; Cryptocarya ferruginea A.Cunn. ex Meisn.; Cryptocarya triplinervis var. euryphylla Domin; Laurus acuminata R.Br. ex Meisn.

= Cryptocarya triplinervis =

Three-veined laurel

Species of tree in the laurel family

Cryptocarya triplinervis, commonly known as blackbutt, three-veined cryptocarya, brown laurel or three-veined laurel, is a species of flowering plant in the family Lauraceae which is native to eastern Australia, Lord Howe Island, and southern Sulawesi. It is a tree with egg-shaped to elliptic or lance-shaped leaves, cream-coloured to pale green flowers, and elliptic black drupes.

== Description ==
Cryptocarya triplinervis is a small to medium-sized tree that typically grows to a height of up to 20 m (66 ft), with a dbh of up to 60 cm (24 in), its trunk sometimes buttressed. The bark is grey brown, mostly smooth with lines of vertical bumps running up the trunk. Its leaves are arranged alternately, egg-shaped to elliptic or lance-shaped, 45–135 mm (1.8–5.3 in) long, 15–5 mm (0.59–0.20 in) wide on a petiole 3–13 mm (0.12–0.51 in) long with a prominent tip. The leaves are dark glossy green above, paler and hairy below, three veined with an easily seen mid vein, which is depressed on the upper side and raised on the lower side of the leaf.

The flowers are arranged in panicles as long as, or longer than the leaves. The flowers are cream-coloured to pale green and tube-shaped, the tube 1.2–2.87 mm (0.047–0.113 in) long and 0.9–1.2 mm (0.035–0.047 in) wide. The tepals are 1.4–2.2 mm (0.055–0.087 in) long and 0.7–1.8 mm (0.028–0.071 in) wide, the outer anthers are 0.5–0.8 mm (0.020–0.031 in) long and 0.4–0.7 mm (0.016–0.028 in) wide, the inner anthers 0.5–0.8 mm (0.020–0.031 in) long and 0.3–0.5 mm (0.012–0.020 in) wide. Flowering occurs from September to December and the fruit is a black drupe, 8–14 mm (0.31–0.55 in) long and 6.5–12 mm (0.26–0.47 in) wide and that ripens from February to May.

== Taxonomy ==
Cryptocarya triplinervis was first formally described in 1810 by botanist Robert Brown in his Prodromus Florae Novae Hollandiae et Insulae Van Diemen. The specific epithet (triplinervis) refers to the three prominent veins on the leaves.

In 1989, Bernard Hyland described two varieties of C. triplinervis in Australian Systematic Botany, and the names, and that of the autonym are accepted by the Australian Plant Census:

- Cryptocarya triplinervis var. pubens B.Hyland has leaves 45–129 mm (1.8–5.1 in) long and 16–45 mm (0.63–1.77 in) wide, that flowers in October and November, and has elliptic drupes about 10 mm (0.39 in) long and 7.5 mm (0.30 in) wide.
- Cryptocarya triplinervis var. riparia B.Hyland has leaves 45–135 mm (1.8–5.3 in) long and 15–50 mm (0.59–1.97 in) wide, that flowers from August to October, and has elliptic drupes 8–13 mm (0.31–0.51 in) long and 6.5–10 mm (0.26–0.39 in) wide.
- Cryptocarya triplinervis R.Br. var. triplinervis (the autonym) has leaves 45–135 mm (1.8–5.3 in) long and 15–50 mm (0.59–1.97 in) wide, that flowers from September to November, and has more or less spherical drupes.

== Distribution and habitat ==
The variety pubens occurs in warmer and drier rainforest, sometimes along creeks and rivers, from the Atherton Tableland in north Queensland to Coffs Harbour in northern New South Wales, at altitudes from sea level to 750 m (2,460 ft). Var. riparia is endemic to Queensland, where it is found between the Iron Range and Cardwell, occurring in gallery forests along creeks and rivers, from sea level to 400 m (1,300 ft). and var. triplinervis is found between Townsville in central Queensland and Smoky Cape in northern New South Wales, and on Lord Howe Island, growing in rainforest, southern beech forest, and littoral rainforest, from sea level to an altitude of 100 m (330 ft).

== Ecology ==
Cryptocarya triplinervis var. riparia is food plant for the larval stages of Graphium sarpedon, the blue triangle butterfly.

== Use in horticulture ==
Like most Australian species of Cryptocarya, removal of the aril is advised to assist seed germination. Around 80% of the seeds will germinate, taking between three and six months. Plants generally take around five years to fruit in Brisbane.

== Gallery ==
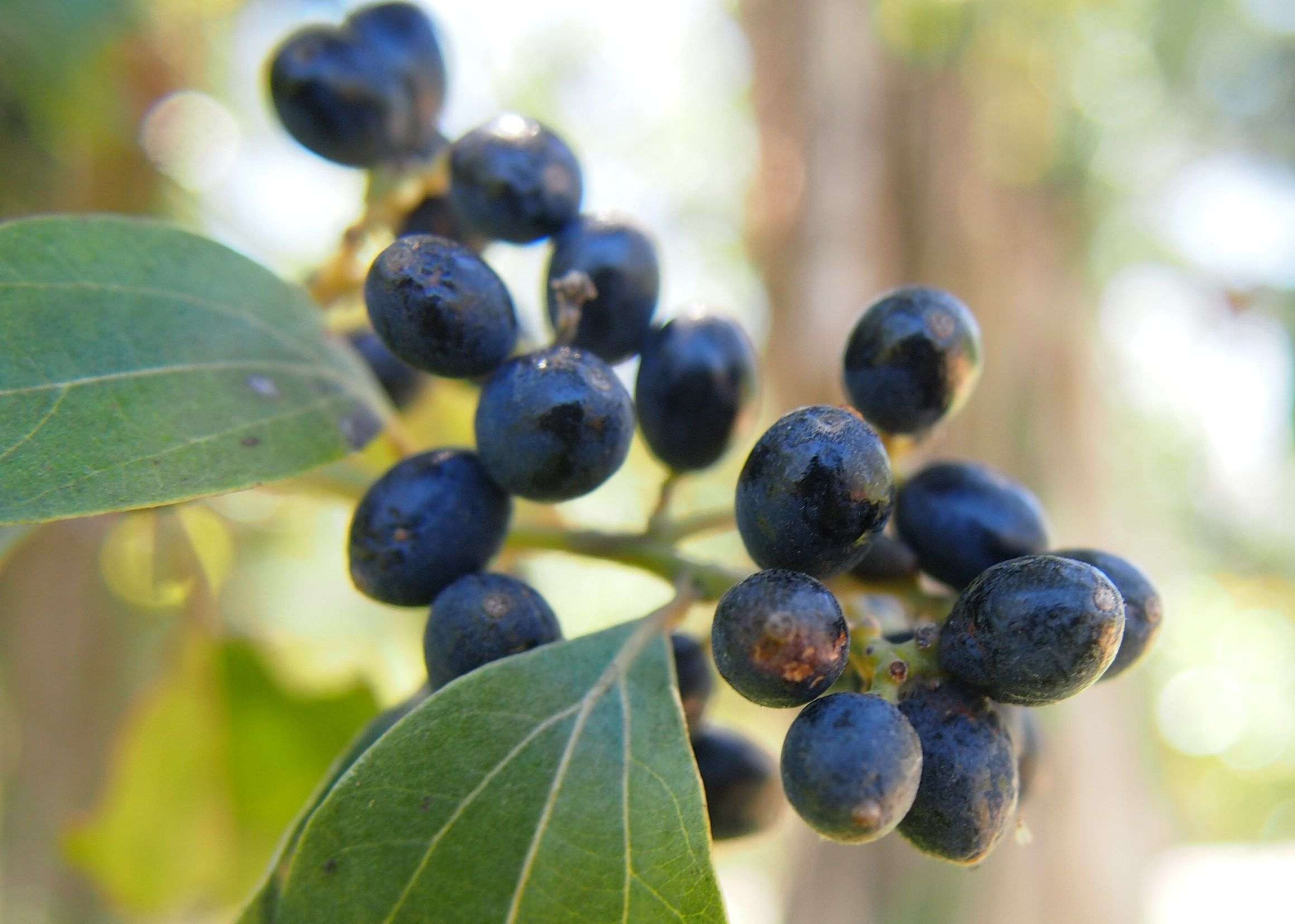
Fruit

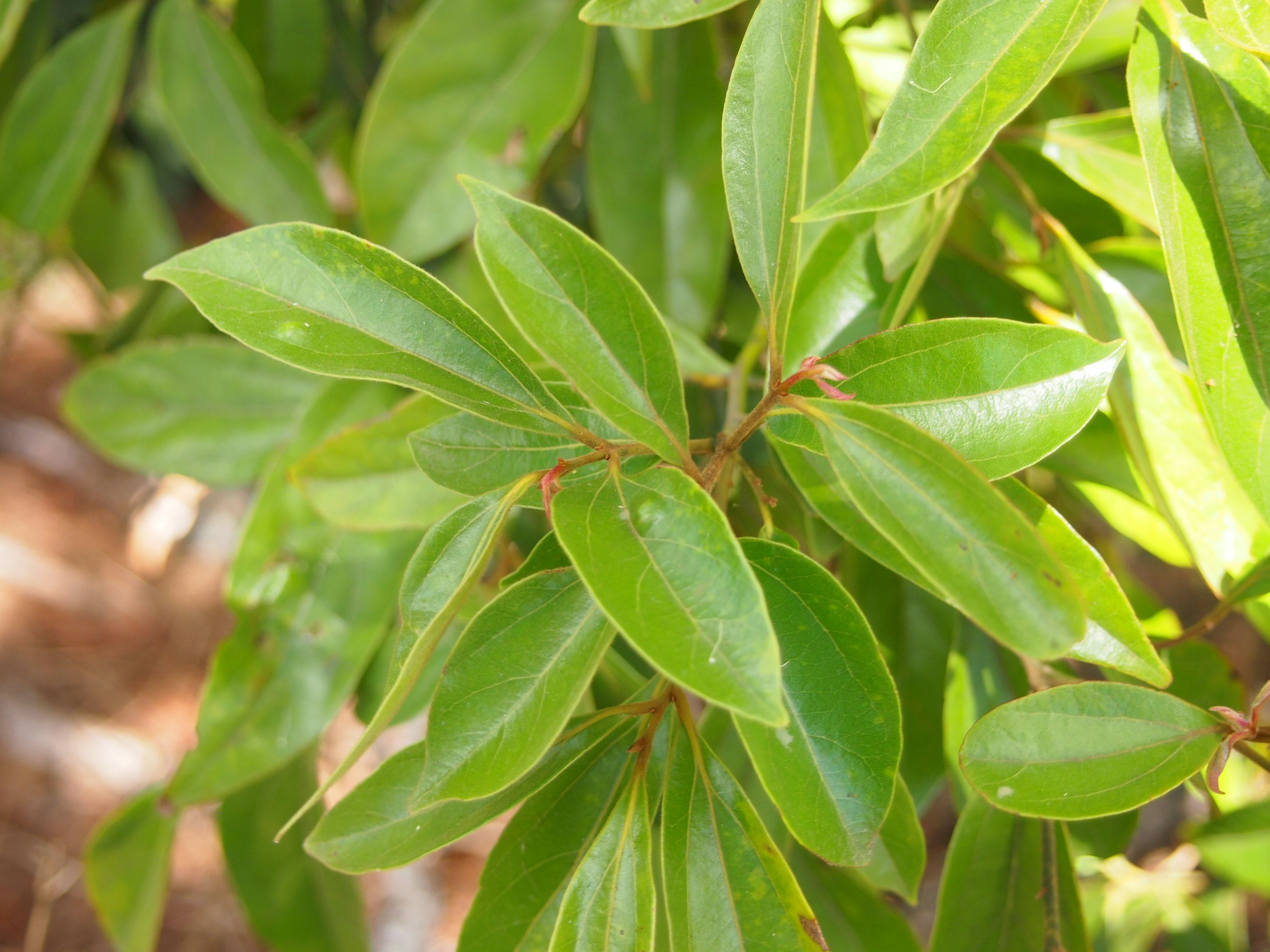
Foliage

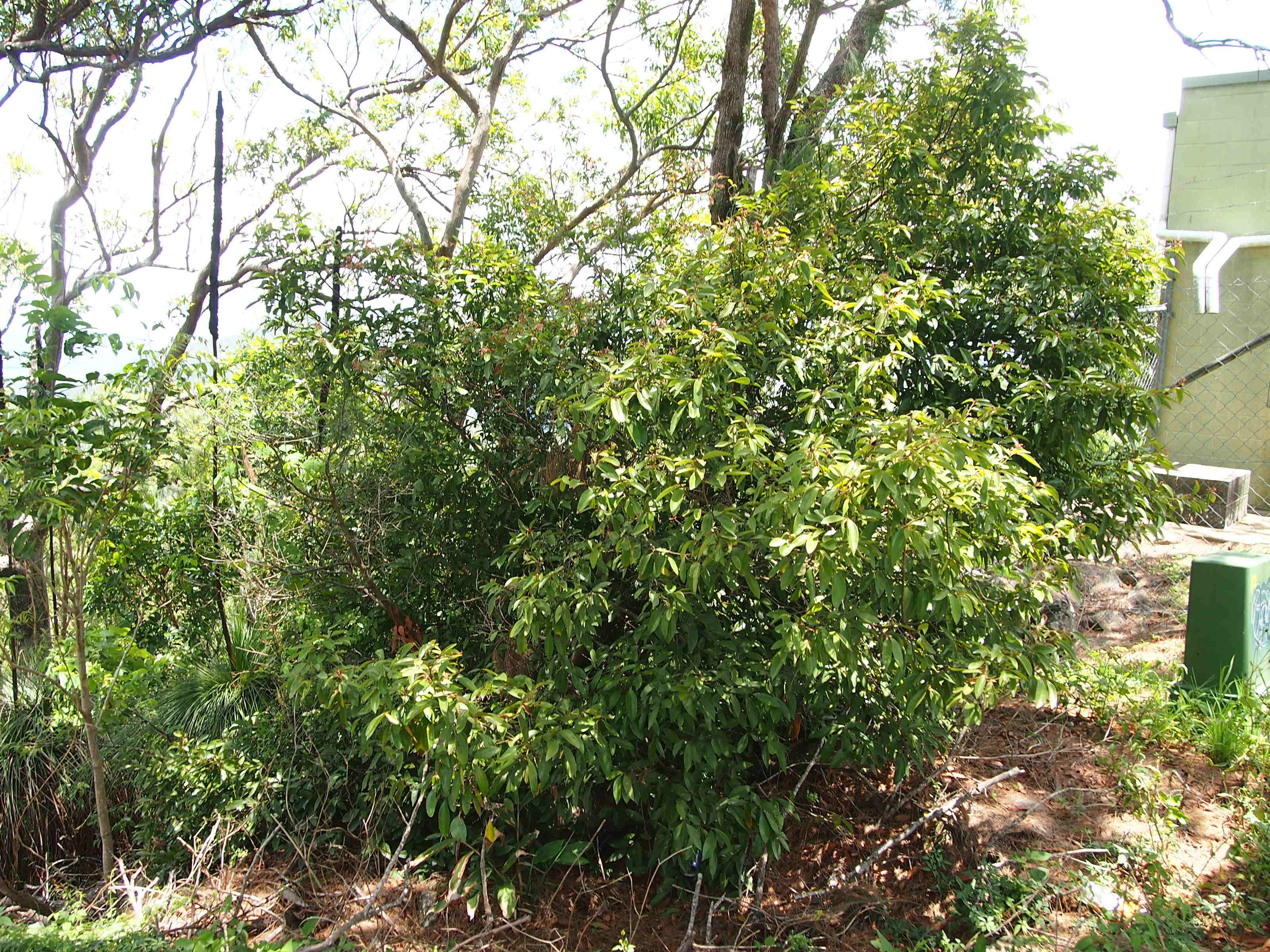

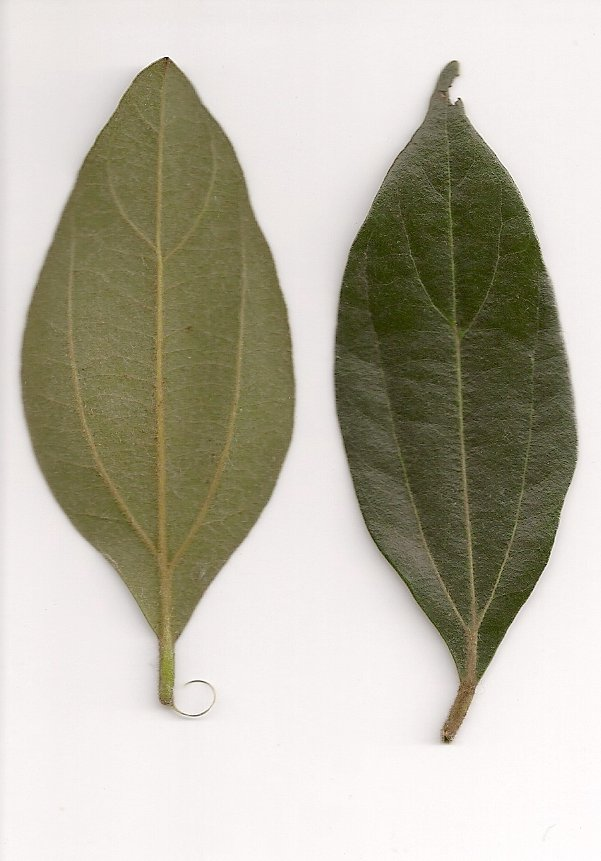
Leaf detail
