= Joseph Bosisto =

Australian politician

Joseph Bosisto CMG, MLA JP (21 March 1827 – 8 November 1898), was a chemist and politician in colonial Victoria, Australia.

== Background ==
Bosisto was the son of William Bosisto and Maria (née Lazenby), of Cookham, Berkshire, and was born on 21 March 1827, at Hammersmith. Becoming a druggist, he emigrated to Adelaide, South Australia, arriving aboard Competitor in October 1848, where he assisted with the establishment of the pharmaceutical business of Messrs. Faulding & Co. Bosisto travelled to Melbourne in 1851, and began business in the Melbourne suburb of Richmond.

== Professional activities ==
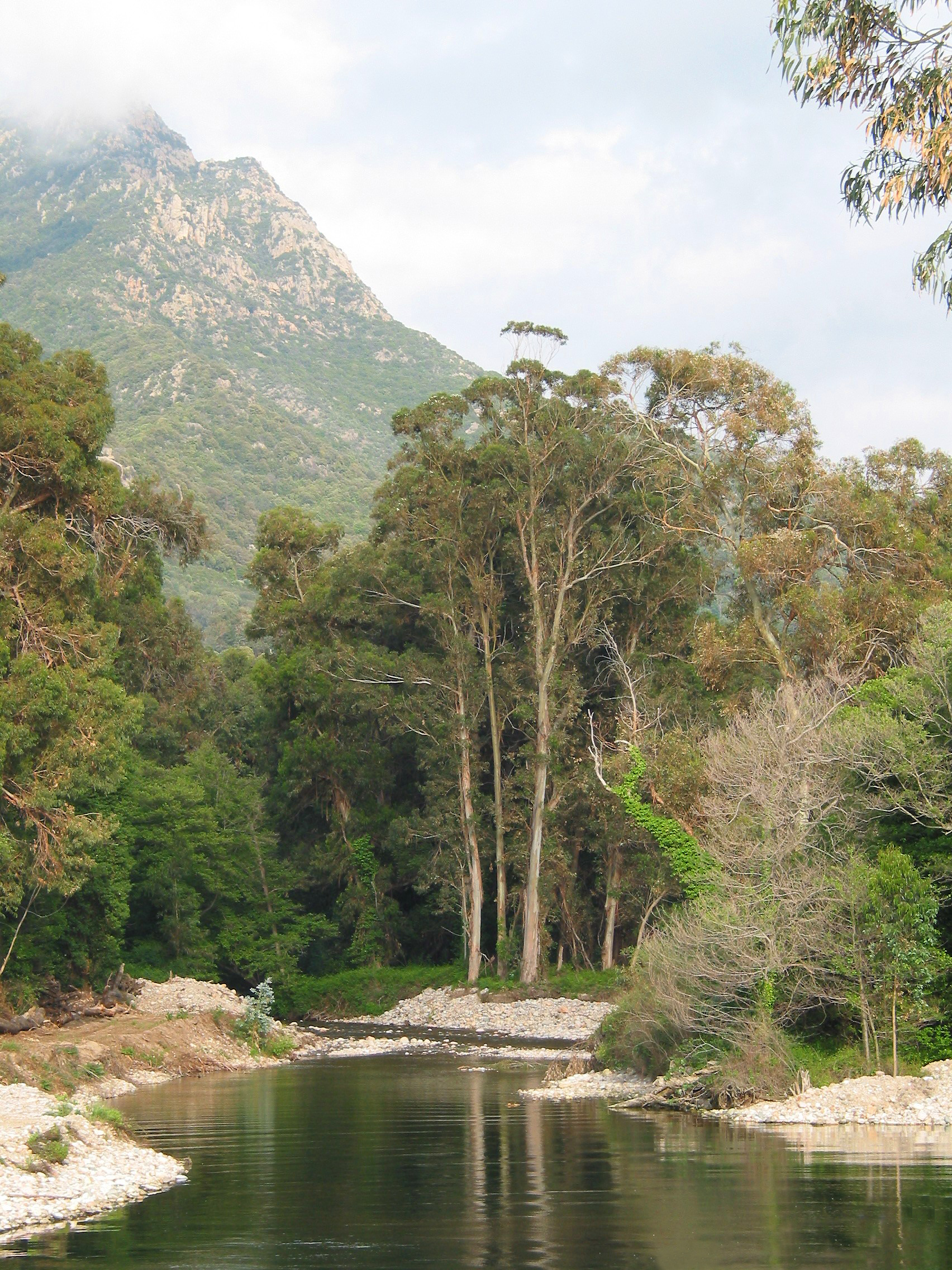
Eucalyptus tree

Bosisto made his name with his extensive involvement in the distilling and marketing of Eucalyptus oil. With assistance from Ferdinand von Mueller, the government botanist of the Colony of Victoria, Bosisto set up his first still in Dandenong, but ranged far afield to obtain suitable eucalyptus leaves for his product. He was probably first to make the oil commercially and won wide renown for Australia's first "original" product. It had become known in Britain by 1865 and later in Europe, India and South Africa. The parrot on the yellow label became a famous trademark.

In 1882, Bosisto became a partner of Felton Grimwade & Co, and, in 1885, his original firm became a subsidiary. When Bosisto had financial difficulties in 1889, as a result of the collapse of the 1880s Land Boom, he mortgaged his share to his partners.

Bosisto founded the Pharmaceutical Society of Victoria in 1857. In 1858, he joined the Royal Society of Victoria, later becoming a councillor, and frequently published scientific papers in the society's journal.

== Assemblies and Commissions ==
From 1874 to 1889, Bosisto was M.L.A. for Richmond. He was part of the commission for the 1875 Victorian Intercolonial Exhibition in Melbourne, and represented Victoria at the Calcutta Exhibition in 1883. He was appointed president of the Royal Commission of the colony at the Colonial and Indian Exhibition, held at South Kensington in 1886, and was awarded a CMG on 28 June of that year for his services at that event.

Bosisto was twice mayor of Richmond, and chairman of the local bench for five years consecutively. He was a justice of the peace, president of the Technological Commission, and Examiner in Materia Medica and Botany at the Victorian College of Pharmacy.

In April 1892, Bosisto re-entered the Assembly as the member for Jolimont and West Richmond, serving until September 1894.

== Other ==
Bosisto married Eliza Johnston in Adelaide in 1852. They had no children and his estate was bequeathed to several nephews and nieces.

Several Australian botanical species are named in honour of Bosisto, including Bosistoa floydii.

== See also ==
- French Australians
