= John Frederick Bailey =

Australian botanist (1866–1938)

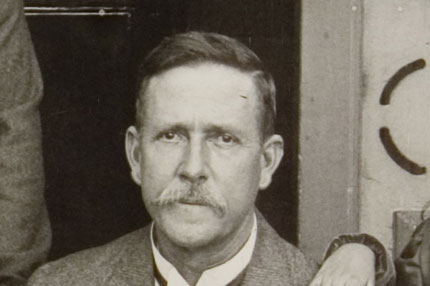
- Born: 5 August 1866; Brisbane, Australia
- Died: 19 May 1938 (aged 71); Brisbane, Australia
- Scientific career
- Fields: Botany, horticulture

John Frederick Bailey (5 August 1866 – 19 May 1938) was a botanist and horticulturist active in Australia in the late 19th and early 20th century.

Bailey became Director of the Botanic Gardens of Brisbane in 1905. He succeeded his father, Frederick Manson Bailey, as state botanist of Queensland for 18 months in 1915–1916. He was subsequently the Director of the Botanic Gardens of Adelaide from 1917 to 1932, where an earlier attempt to establish a botanic garden had been made in 1839 by his grandfather, John Bailey, South Australia's first Colonial Botanist.

== Memberships ==
- Royal Society of Queensland, Secretary from 1893 to 1905, President in 1909
- Horticultural Society

== Publications ==
- 1896: Report on the timber trees of Herberton District, North Queensland. 15 pages.
- 1906: A Selection of Flowering Climbers. 15 pages.
- 1910: Introduction of economic plants into Queensland. 102 pages.

== Literature ==
- Adelaide Botanic Garden, Centenary Volume 1855-1955 (Adel, 1955)
- Votes and Proceedings (Legislative Assembly, Queensland), 1906, 2, 146, (South Australia), 1918, 3 (89)
- R. H. Pulleine, 'The botanical colonisation of the Adelaide plains', Proceedings of the Royal Geographical Society of Australasia (South Australian Branch), 35 (1935)
- C. T. White, 'The Bailey family and its place in the botanical history of Australia', JRHSQ, 3 (1936–47)
- Observer (Adelaide), 30 June 1923, 18 Apr 1925
- Australian botanists biographical files (Australian Academy of Science Library).
