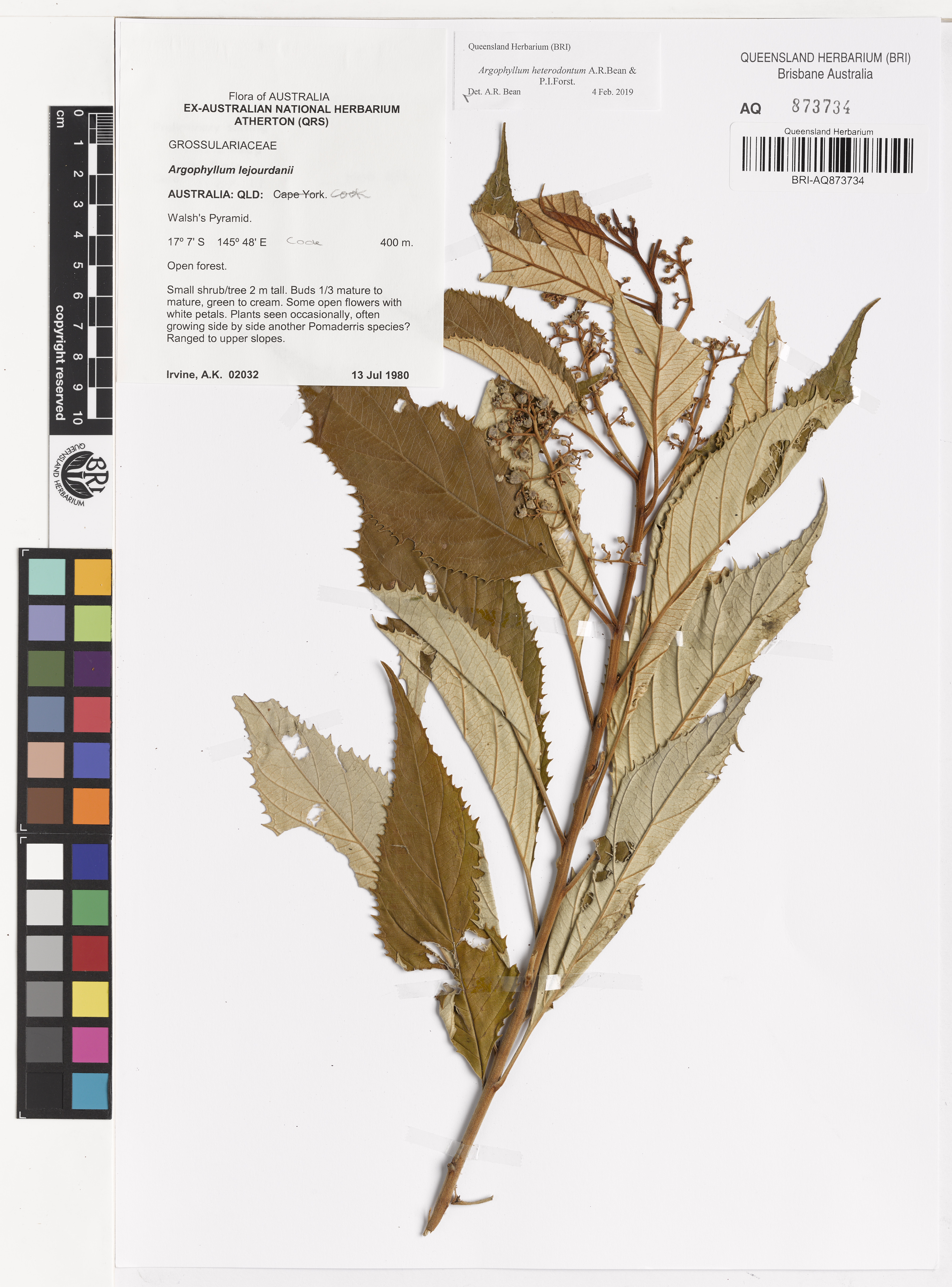
- Herbarium specimen

Conservation status
- Least Concern (NCA)

Scientific classification
- Kingdom: Plantae
- Clade: Embryophytes
- Clade: Tracheophytes
- Clade: Spermatophytes
- Clade: Angiosperms
- Clade: Eudicots
- Clade: Asterids
- Order: Asterales
- Family: Argophyllaceae
- Genus: Argophyllum
- Species: A. heterodontum

Binomial name
- Argophyllum heterodontum A.R.Bean & P.I.Forst.

Synonyms
- Argophyllum lejourdanii var. cryptophlebum F.M.Bailey; Argophyllum nitidum var. cryptophleba Ewart, Jean White & B.Rees

= Argophyllum heterodontum =

Species of flowering plant

Argophyllum heterodontum is a plant in the Argophyllaceae family endemic to a small part of north eastern Queensland. It has an affinity to A. lejourdanii and was described and named in 2018.

== Description ==
Argophyllum heterodontum is a straggly shrub growing to 2–6 m (6 ft 7 in – 19 ft 8 in) tall. New growth is covered in rusty brown hairs, which become creamy white when more than 10 cm (3.9 in) from the tip. The leaves are held on petioles up to 35 mm (1.4 in) long, are simple, alternate and highly discolorous - the upper sides are green and the lower sides are silvery white. They are elliptic to ovate with toothed margins and 6–10 lateral veins either side of the midrib, and they measure up to 14 cm (5.5 in) long by 5.5 cm (2.2 in) wide.

The inflorescences are panicles produced in the leaf axils - they are covered with dense, matted, woolly hairs, and may reach up to 9 cm (3.5 in) long. The small flowers are actinomorphic (i.e. with multiple lines of symmetry) and have both pistils and stamens. They have 5 fused greenish sepals with lobes about 1.5 mm (0.06 in) long, and 5 white petals about 3.5 mm (0.14 in) long. The 5 stamens are about 1.5 mm (0.06 in) long, as is the style.

The fruit is a capsule about 4 mm (0.16 in) long and 5 mm (0.20 in) diameter.

== Taxonomy ==
This species was first described, along with a number of other new species in the genus, in 2018 by the Australian botanists Anthony Bean and Paul Forster. Their paper, titled "A taxonomic revision of Argophyllum J.R.Forst. & G.Forst. (Argophyllaceae) in Australia", was published in the Journal Austrobaileya. The type specimen was collected by Forster in 2003 at Walshs Pyramid, about 20 km (12 mi) south of Cairns.

=== Etymology ===
The genus name Argophyllum is derived from Ancient Greek Árgos meaning white or shining, and phúllon meaning leaf. It refers to the white colouration of the underside of the leaves. The species epithet heterodontum is from héteros meaning different, and odóntos meaning tooth. It refers to the variable size of the teeth on the leaf margin.

== Distribution and habitat ==
A. heterodontum is restricted to a very small area of the Wet Tropics of Queensland, mostly in the area of Walsh's Pyramid, and with a disjunct population around Butchers Creek Falls to the south-west. It inhabits gallery forest and rock outcrops on the margins of rainforest. The Walsh's Pyramid population is on very thin soil derived from granite, while at Butchers Creek they grow on basaltic and metamorphic soils. The total area of occupancy of this species is just 36 km^{2} (14 sq mi). (Note: For a definition of Area of Occupancy see this page at the Atlas of Living Australia)

== Conservation ==
Whilst this species is listed by the Queensland Department of Environment and Science as least concern, Bean and Forster recommended in their paper that it should be given the rating of vulnerable, arguing that it may be affected by burning and weed invasion (while most of the population occurs in National Parks, some occurs on freehold land). At the same time, they also accepted that there is no immediate threat to the species.

As of 24 January 2024, Argophyllum heterodontum has not been assessed by the International Union for Conservation of Nature.
