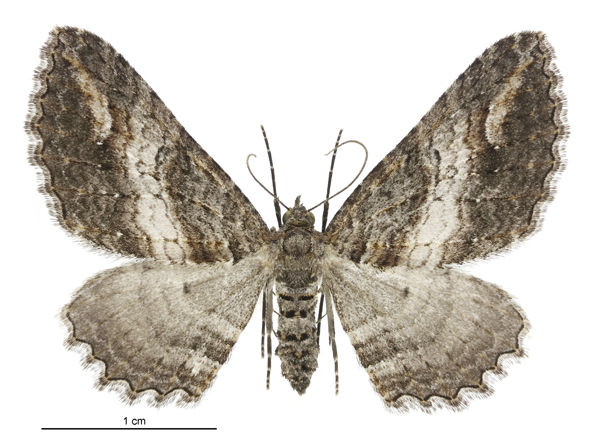
- Female
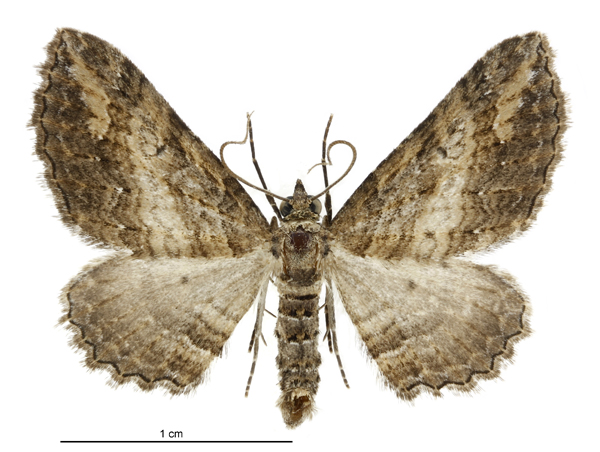
- Male

Scientific classification
- Kingdom: Animalia
- Phylum: Arthropoda
- Class: Insecta
- Order: Lepidoptera
- Family: Geometridae
- Genus: Horisme
- Species: H. suppressaria

Binomial name
- Horisme suppressaria (Walker, 1863)

Synonyms
- Phibalapteryx suppressaria Walker, 1863; Xanthorhoe suppressaria (Walker, 1863); Hydriomena paucita Howes, 1942

= Horisme suppressaria =

Species of moth

Horisme suppressaria is a moth of the family Geometridae. This species was first described by Francis Walker. Currently the taxonomy of this species is uncertain and as a result this species is also known as Horisme (s.l.) suppressaria. The species is endemic to New Zealand and has been observed in both the North and South Islands. The larval hosts of H. suppressaria are species in the genus Corokia including Corokia cotoneaster.

== Taxonomy ==
This species was first described by Francis Walker in 1863 using specimens collected in Nelson by T. R. Oxley and originally named Phibalapteryx suppressaria. Edward Meyrick discussed this species under this name in 1885. In 1917 Meyrick placed this species in the genus Xanthorhoe. George Hudson discussed this species under that name in his 1928 book The butterflies and moths of New Zealand. In 1942 thinking he was describing a new species, George Howes described this species as Hydriomena? paucita. Prout discussed this species, hypothesising that the species was misplaced in the genus Xanthorhoe and that it should be placed in either Euphyia or Horisme. In 1979 J. D. Holloway discussed this species under the name Horisme suppressaria. J. S. Dugdale also discussed this species under that name in 1988 and at the same time synonymised Hydriomena paucita into this species. As a result of this uncertainly and the possibility that this species belongs to another genus, this species is also currently known as Horisme (s.l.) suppressaria. The female lectotype is held at the Natural History Museum, London.

== Description ==
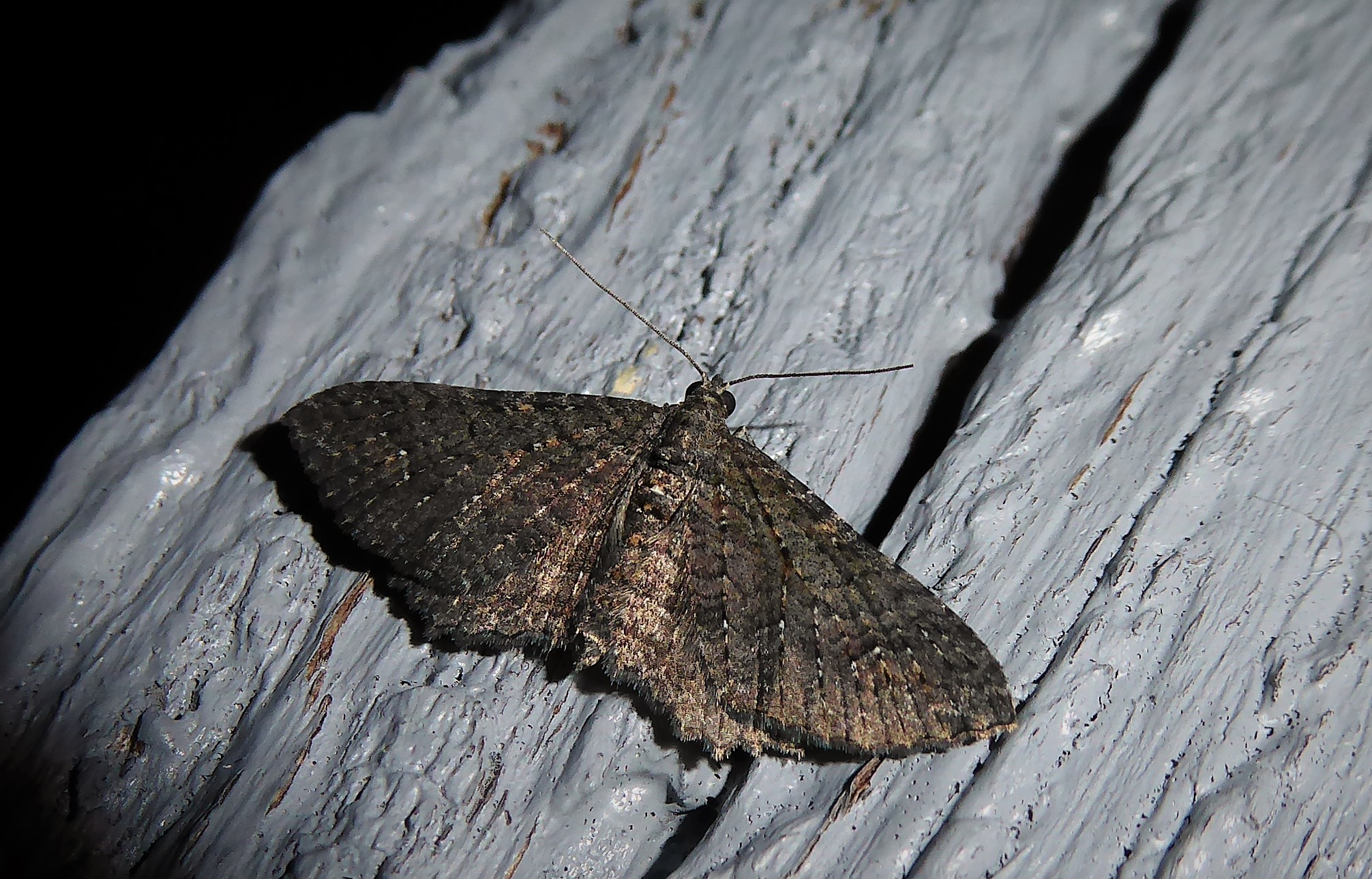
H. suppressaria, dark form

Walker described the adult female of this species as follows:

Female. Blackish cinereous, a little paler beneath. Palpi porrect, compressed, fringed, subrostriform, much shorter than the breadth of the head; third joint very short. Wings elongate, moderately broad; marginal festoon black; exterior border slightly notched. Fore wings acute, with many black oblique indistinct slightly denticulated lines; an indistinct ferruginous band near the base, an oblique ferruginous subapical streak, and a pale cinereous diffuse middle band; exterior border slightly convex, very oblique. Hindwings with a few indistinct lines. Length of the body 5 lines; of the wings 14 lines.

This species is variable in colour with some specimens being a darker shade than others.

== Distribution ==
This species is endemic New Zealand. It has been observed in the North and South Islands.

== Behaviour ==
Larvae have been observed in February and adults have been observed on the wing in October, January and February.

== Host species ==
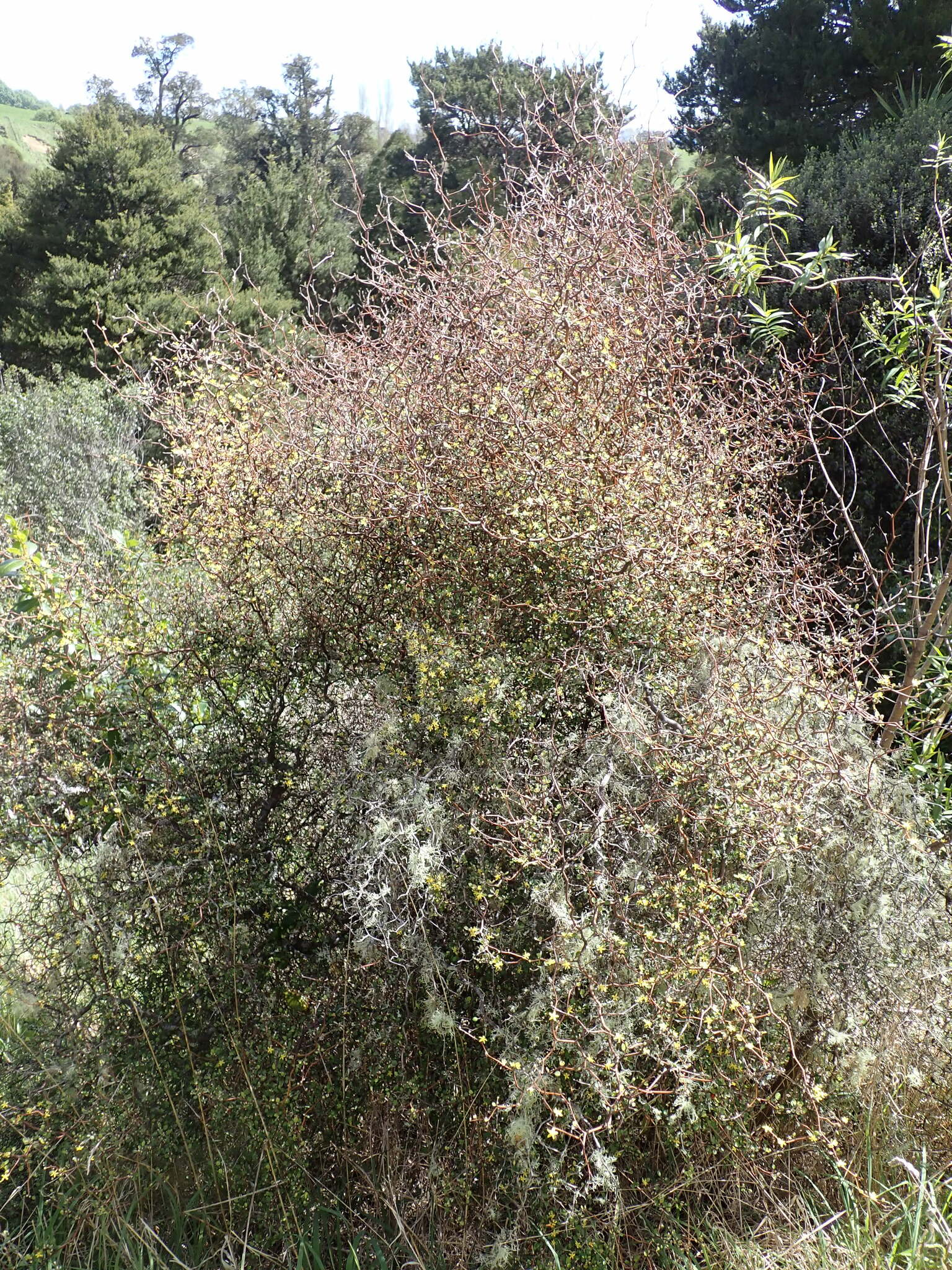
Larval host C. cotoneaster.

The larval hosts of H. suppressaria are species in the genus Corokia including Corokia cotoneaster.
