= A. iridescens =

A. iridescens may refer to:

- Abacetus iridescens, a ground beetle
- Acrossocheilus iridescens, a freshwater cyprinid fish native to China, Laos, and Vietnam
- Amphorella iridescens, a land snail found in Madeira
- Arbelodes iridescens, a moth found in South Africa
- Archiminolia iridescens, a sea snail found off Japan
- Argophyllum iridescens, a plant found in Australia
- Argyripnus iridescens, a marine fish found in the Southwest Pacific
- Atractus iridescens, the iridescent ground snake, found in Colombia and Ecuador
- Aylostera iridescens, a synonym of Aylostera pygmaea, a cactus native to Bolivia and Argentina
