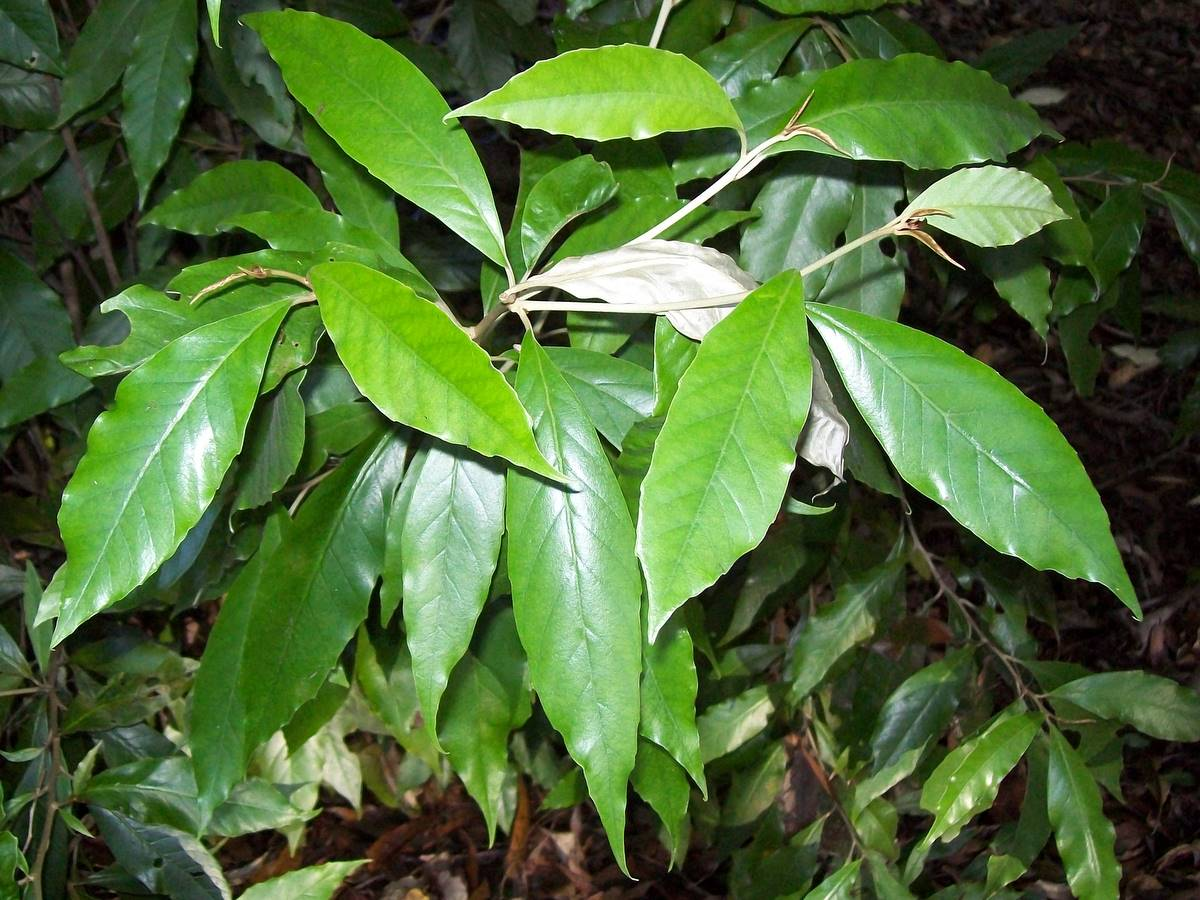

Scientific classification
- Kingdom: Plantae
- Clade: Tracheophytes
- Clade: Angiosperms
- Clade: Eudicots
- Clade: Asterids
- Order: Asterales
- Family: Argophyllaceae
- Genus: Argophyllum
- Species: A. nullumense

Binomial name
- Argophyllum nullumense R.T.Baker

= Argophyllum nullumense =

Silver leaf

Species of flowering plant

Argophyllum nullumense, the silver leaf, is a shrub or small tree found in eastern Australia. It is a rare plant with a Rare or Threatened Australian Plants (ROTAP) rating of 3RCa

The generic name comes from the Greek, meaning "bright leaf", referring to the silvery white under-side of the leaves. The original specimen was collected from Mount Nullum, near Murwillumbah.

It grows from near Nimbin in the south to Mackay, Queensland. Most often seen on the Mount Warning caldera, growing in warm temperate rainforest based on the relatively infertile rhyolite based soils.

Growing to 8 metres tall and a stem diameter of 15 cm. The plant often branches close to the ground. Yellow flowers form on terminal panicles from December to January. The fruiting capsule matures from May to September. Around 30 very small seeds per capsule. Germination from fresh seed is relatively swift and reliable.

The species was first described in 1899 by Richard Thomas Baker.
