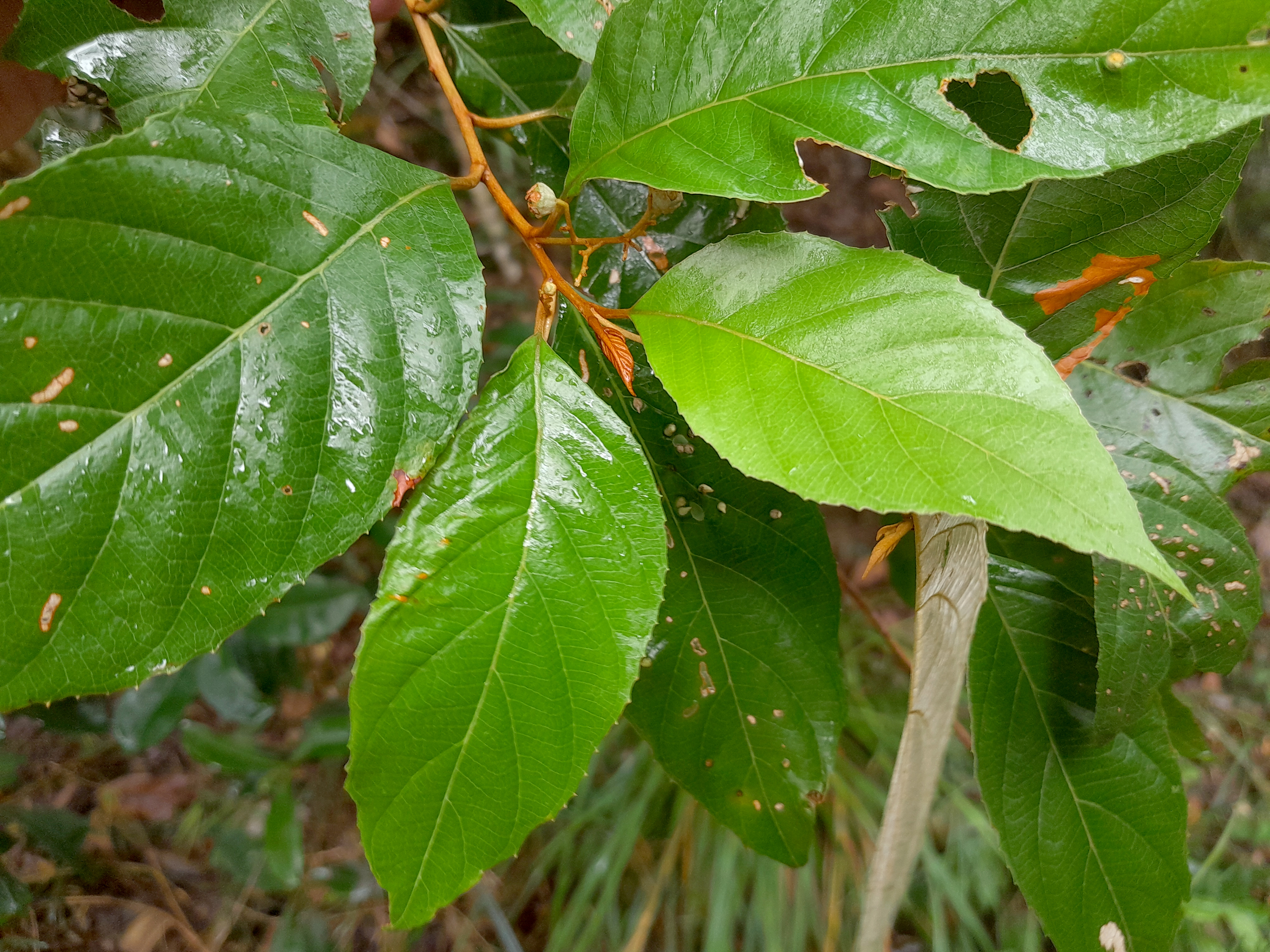
- Foliage

Conservation status
- Least Concern (NCA)

Scientific classification
- Kingdom: Plantae
- Clade: Embryophytes
- Clade: Tracheophytes
- Clade: Spermatophytes
- Clade: Angiosperms
- Clade: Eudicots
- Clade: Asterids
- Order: Asterales
- Family: Argophyllaceae
- Genus: Argophyllum
- Species: A. curtum

Binomial name
- Argophyllum curtum A.R.Bean & P.I.Forst.
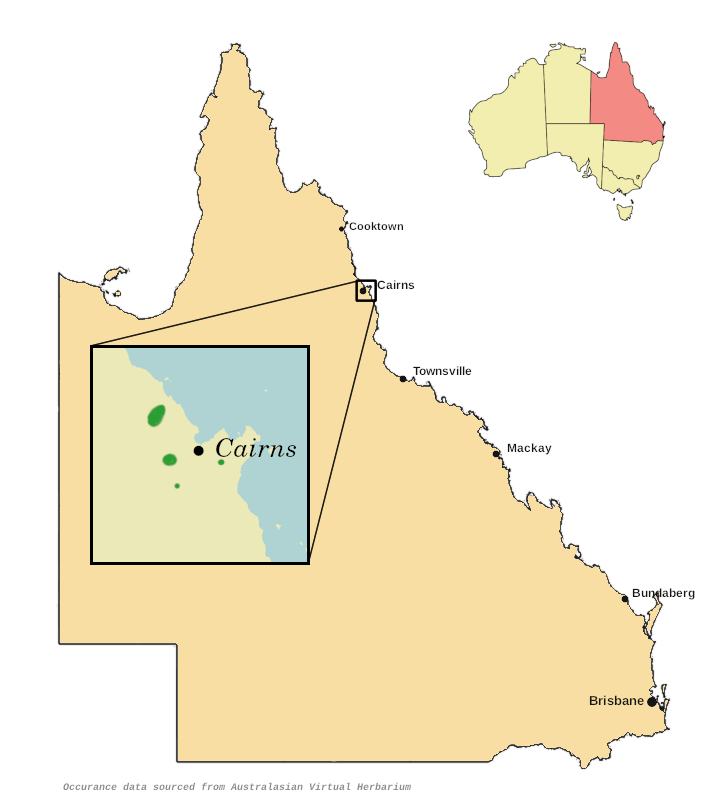

= Argophyllum curtum =

Species of flowering plant

Argophyllum curtum is a species of plant in the Argophyllaceae family that is endemic to a small part of north eastern Queensland, Australia. It was described and named in 2018 and has the conservation status of least-concern.

== Description ==
Argophyllum curtum is an evergreen shrub growing up to 5 m (16 ft) tall. The new growth is rusty-brown in colour due to a dense covering of brown hairs. The leaves are dark green and hairless above and silvery below, and they measure up to 17 cm (6.7 in) long by 7 cm (2.8 in) wide. They are arranged alternately on the branches, attached by a petiole measuring up to 2.8 cm (1.1 in) long. They have six to nine lateral veins on either side of the midrib. The leaf margins (edges) are finely toothed with between 23 and 38 teeth on each edge, the largest of which are just 1 mm (0.04 in) long.

The inflorescences are produced from the leaf axils, may be up to 9 cm (3.5 in) long and are densely covered in hairs. Flowers are white with 5 petals, measuring about 1 cm (0.4 in) across.

The fruit is a capsule up to 3.5 mm (0.14 in) long and 5.5 mm (0.22 in) diameter.

=== Phenology ===
Flowering has been observed from May to October, and fruit appear from June to November.

== Taxonomy ==
In 2018 the Australian botanists Anthony Bean and Paul Forster conducted a review of the Australian members of the genus Argophyllum, with the result that 7 new species – including A. curtum – were described. Their paper, titled "A taxonomic revision of Argophyllum J.R.Forst. & G.Forst. (Argophyllaceae) in Australia", was published in the Queensland Herbarium's journal Austrobaileya. The type specimen was collected in 2005 near Cairns by Forster.

=== Etymology ===
The genus name Argophyllum is derived from Ancient Greek Árgos meaning 'white' or 'shining', and phúllon meaning 'leaf'. It refers to the white colouration of the underside of the leaves. The species epithet curtum is from the Latin curtus, meaning 'short', and refers to the very small teeth on the margins of the leaves.

== Distribution and habitat ==
A. curtum is restricted to a small area of the Wet Tropics of Queensland between Kuranda and Edmonton near Cairns. There are 5, possibly 6, populations in that area (one that was previously reported has not been relocated since). It is found in open forest and on the margins of streams in complex notophyll rainforest, usually on granitic alluvial soils. The altitudinal range is between 120 and 630 m (390 and 2,070 ft).

== Conservation ==
The taxon authors conceded that there are no immediate threats to this species, but also noted that the available habitat is small and potentially subject to detrimental forces. They suggested that a vulnerable status be applied to the species, however the Queensland Department of Environment and Science has assessed it as least concern. As of 26 May 2026, it has not been assessed by the International Union for Conservation of Nature (IUCN).

== Gallery ==
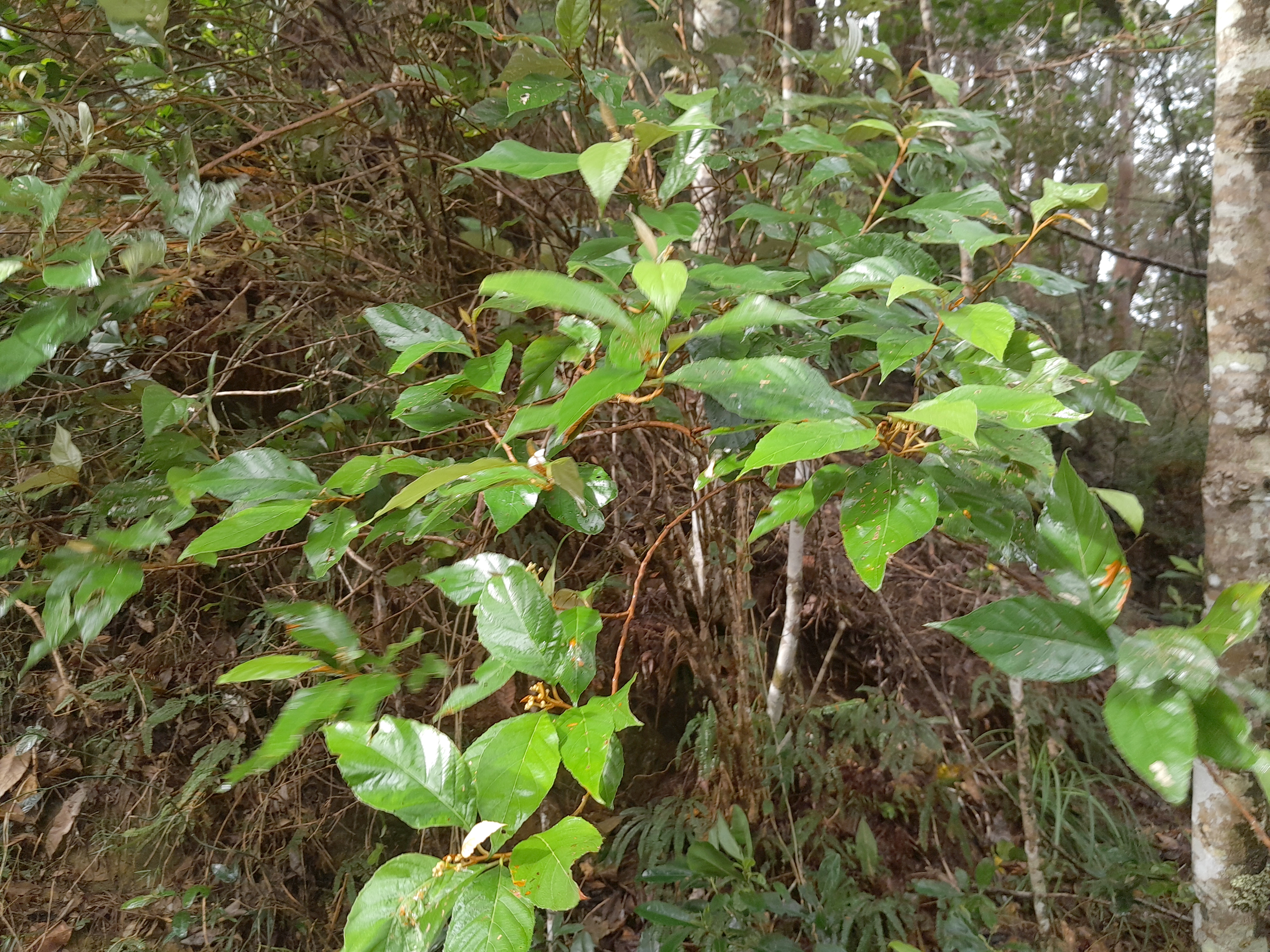
Habit

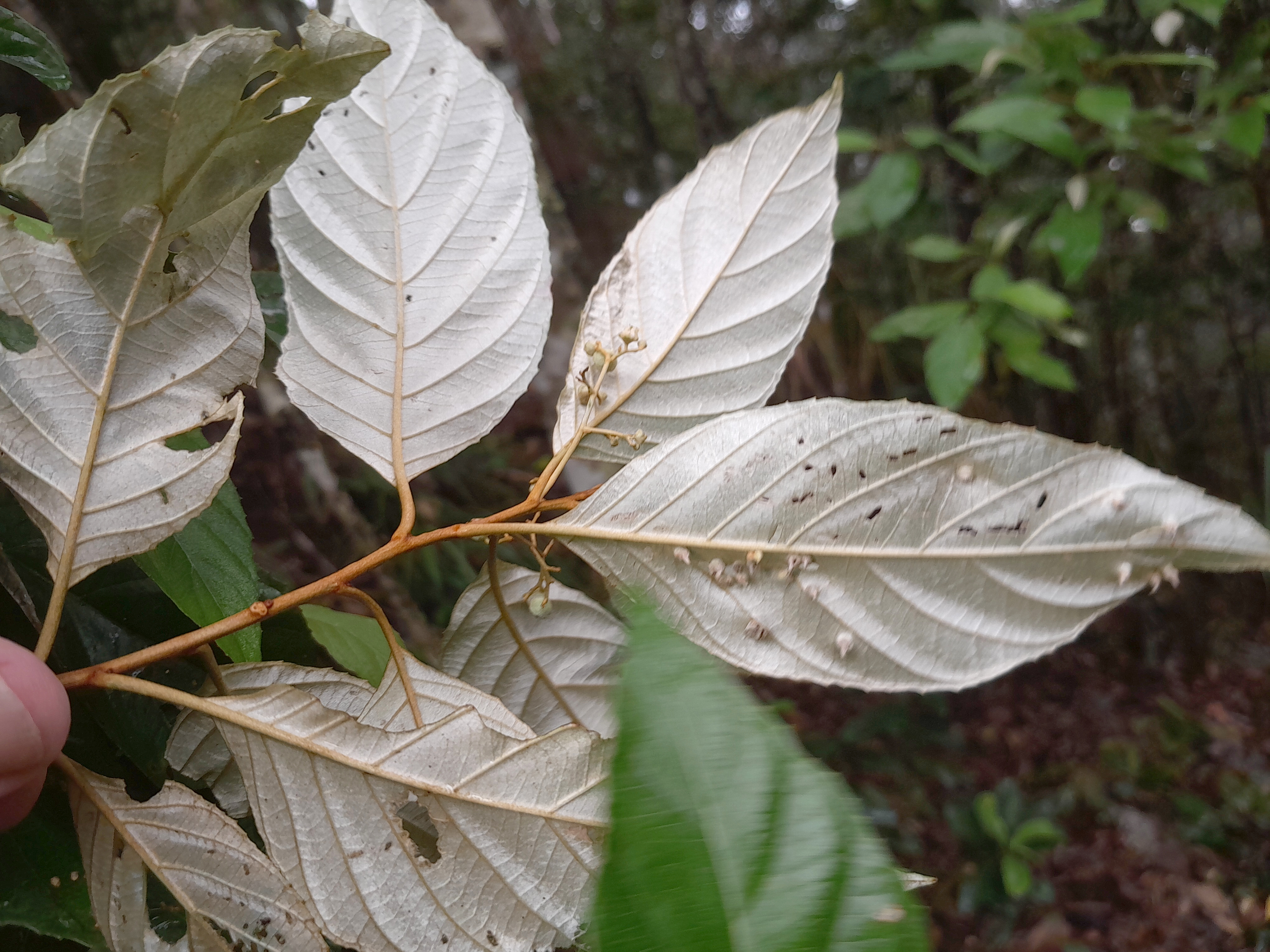
Silvery underside of leaves

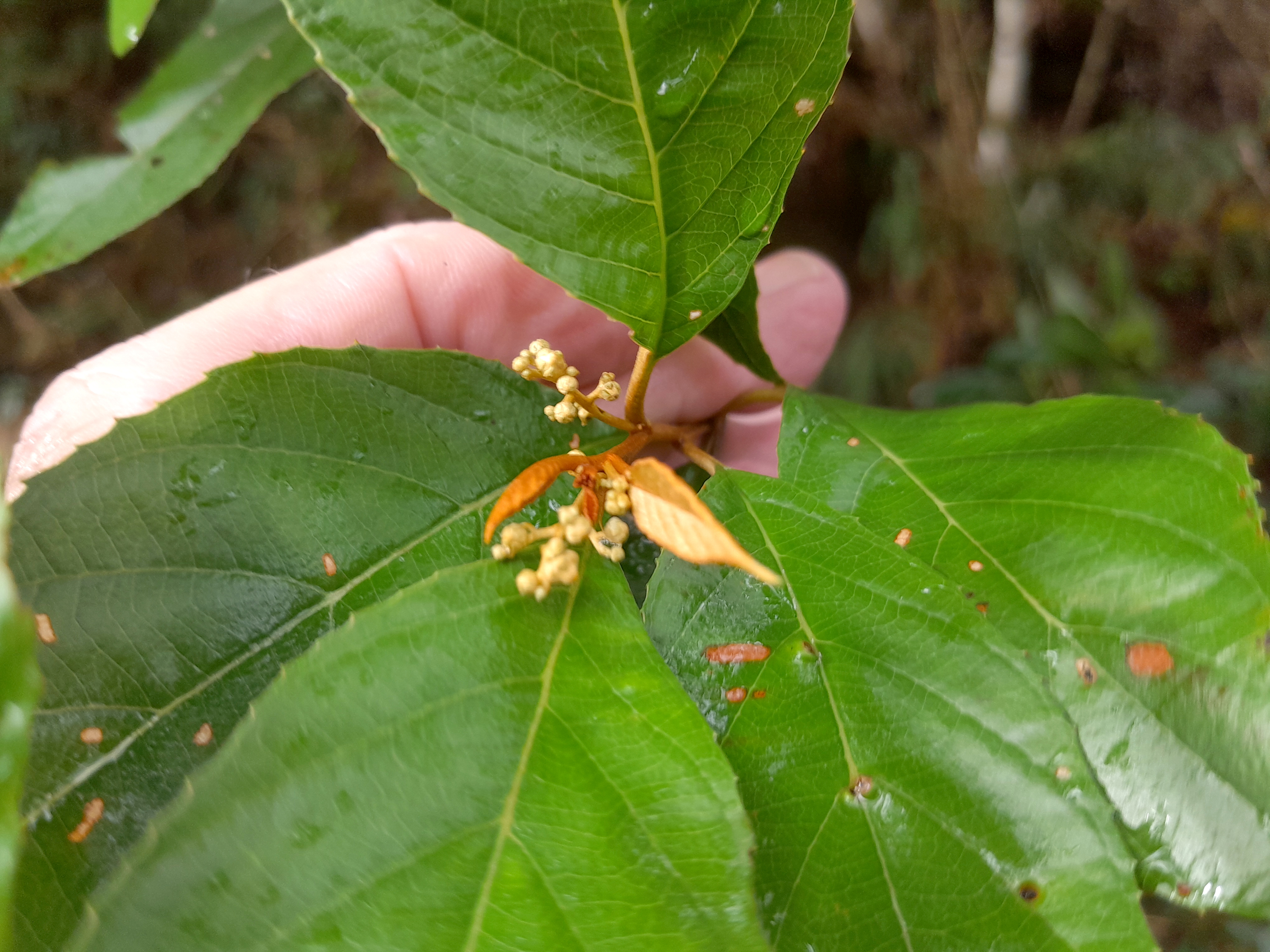
Flower buds and rusty coloured new growth

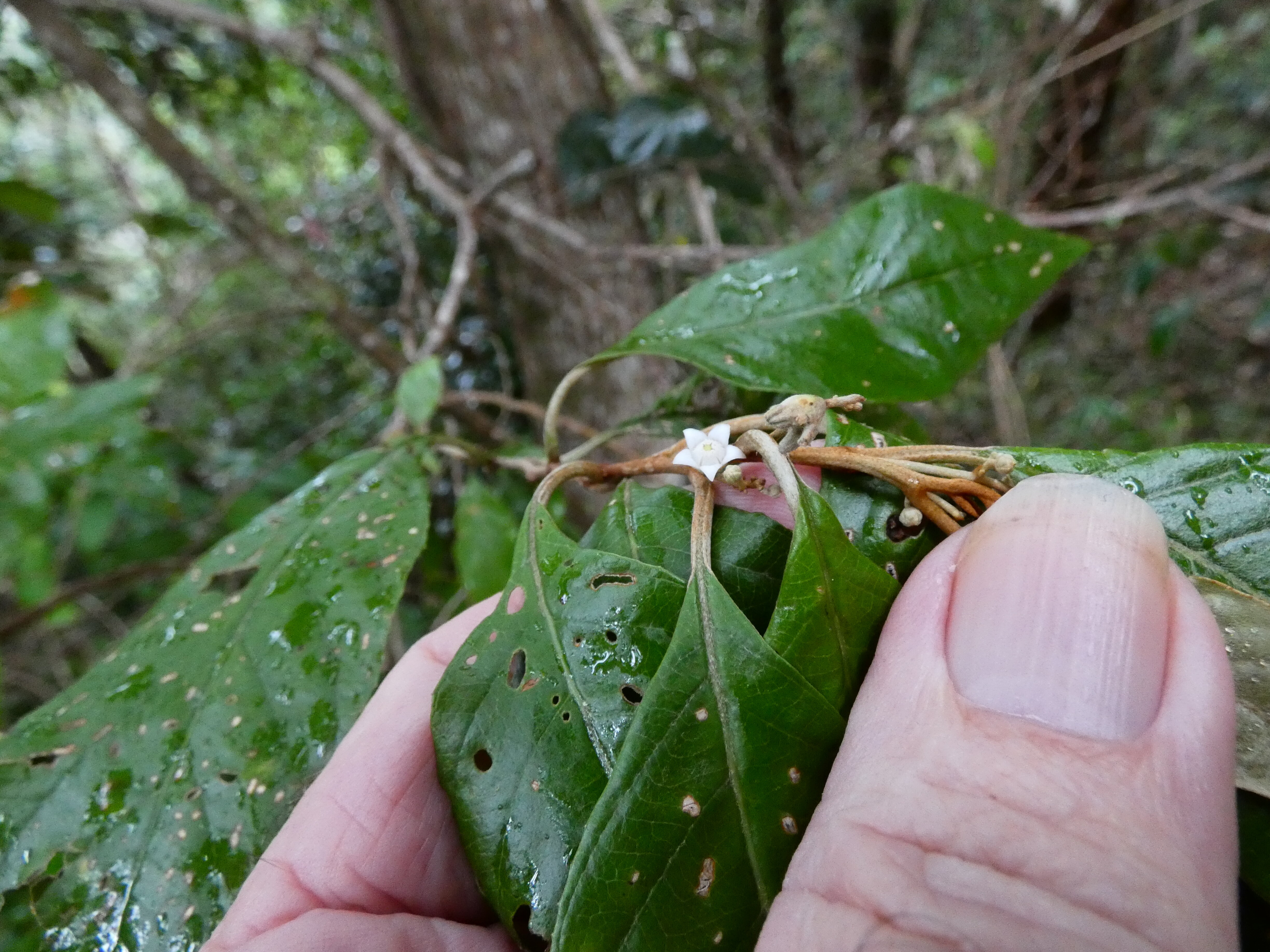
Flower

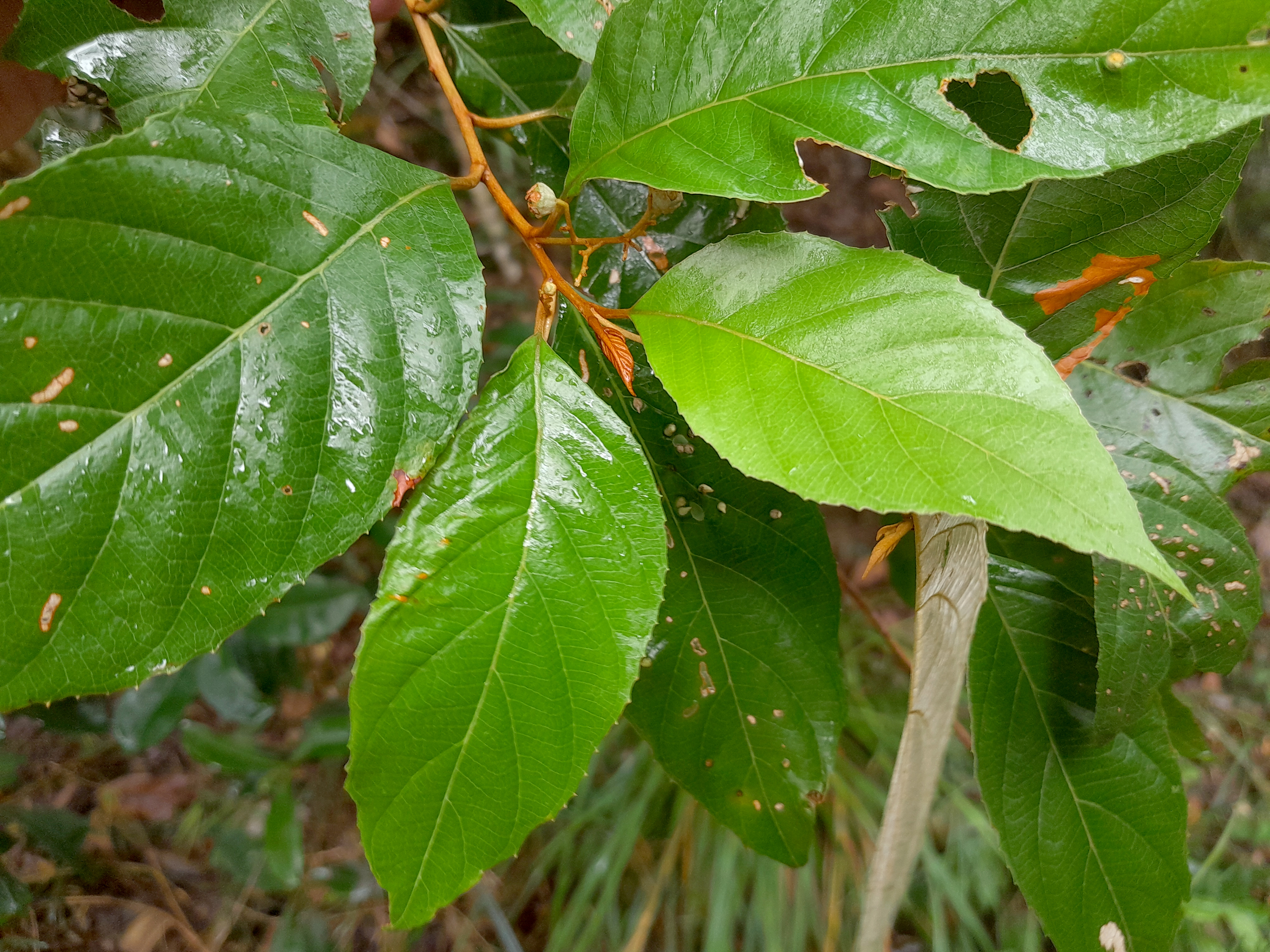
Capsular fruit
