= Argophyllum loxotrichum =

Conservation status
- Least Concern (NCA)

Scientific classification
- Kingdom: Plantae
- Clade: Embryophytes
- Clade: Tracheophytes
- Clade: Spermatophytes
- Clade: Angiosperms
- Clade: Eudicots
- Clade: Asterids
- Order: Asterales
- Family: Argophyllaceae
- Genus: Argophyllum
- Species: A. loxotrichum

Binomial name
- Argophyllum loxotrichum A.R.Bean & P.I.Forst.

Species of flowering plant

Argophyllum loxotrichum is a plant in the Argophyllaceae family endemic to a small part of north eastern Queensland, Australia. It was described and named in 2018.

== Taxonomy ==
This species was first described, along with a number of other new species in this genus, in 2018 by the Australian botanists Anthony Bean and Paul Forster who published it in the Journal Austrobaileya. The type specimen was collected in 1951 near Wallaman Falls by Stanley Thatcher Blake.

=== Etymology ===
The genus name Argophyllum is derived from Ancient Greek Árgos meaning white or shining, and phúllon meaning leaf. It refers to the white colouration of the underside of the leaves. The species epithet loxotrichum is created from the Greek loxós, (meaning slanted, diagonal, oblique), and trícha (meaning hair), and is a reference to the Y-shaped hairs on the upper leaf surface—one of the diagnostic characteristics that separates this species from the similar A. lejourdanii.

== Distribution and habitat ==
A. loxotrichum is endemic to north eastern Queensland, but occurs in two disjunct populations that are more than 200 km (120 mi) apart. The southern group is west of Ingham while the northern one occurs from about Cairns to Mossman. The southern population is found in grassy woodlands or in the ecotone between that and rainforest but the northern population inhabits stunted well-developed rainforest. It has been observed at elevations from 100 to 1,060 m (330 to 3,480 ft) but occurs predominately at around 500 m, and it grows on a variety of soil types.

== Conservation ==
This species is listed by the Queensland Department of Environment and Science as least concern. As of 26 August 2021, it has not been assessed by the IUCN.
