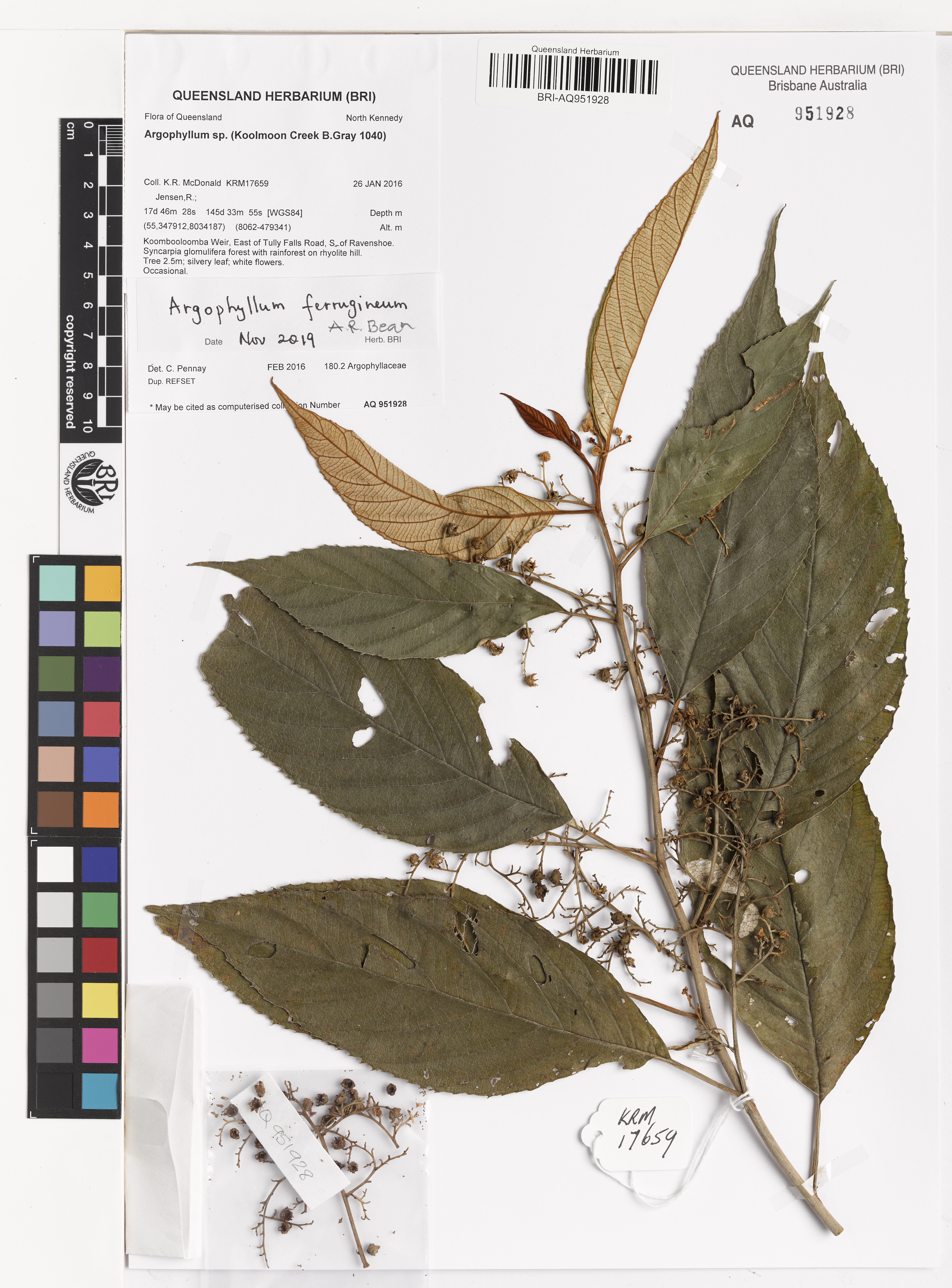
- Herbarium specimen

Conservation status
- Least Concern (NCA)

Scientific classification
- Kingdom: Plantae
- Clade: Tracheophytes
- Clade: Angiosperms
- Clade: Eudicots
- Clade: Asterids
- Order: Asterales
- Family: Argophyllaceae
- Genus: Argophyllum
- Species: A. ferrugineum

Binomial name
- Argophyllum ferrugineum A.R.Bean & P.I.Forst.

= Argophyllum ferrugineum =

Species of flowering plant

Argophyllum ferrugineum is a plant in the Argophyllaceae family endemic to a small part of northeastern Queensland, Australia. It was described and named in 2018 and has the conservation status of Least Concern

== Taxonomy ==
This species was first described, along with a number of other new species in this genus, in 2018 by the Australian botanists Anthony Bean and Paul Forster who published it in the Journal Austrobaileya. The type specimen was collected in 1995 near Tully Falls by Forster.

=== Etymology ===
The genus name Argophyllum is derived from Ancient Greek Árgos meaning white or shining, and phúllon meaning leaf. It refers to the white colouration of the underside of the leaves. The species epithet ferrugineum is from the Latin ferrūgineus meaning rust-coloured, referring to the colour of the veins on the undersurface of the leaves.

== Distribution and habitat ==
A. ferrugineum is restricted to a small area of the Wet Tropics of Queensland, mostly in the area of Tully Falls and Koolmoon Creek and with a disjunct population around Kirrama, west of Cardwell. It inhabits open forest and the edges of rainforest, usually along stream margins, on shallow rhyolite soils.

== Conservation ==
This species is listed by the Queensland Department of Environment and Science as least concern. As of 29 August 2021, it has not been assessed by the IUCN.
