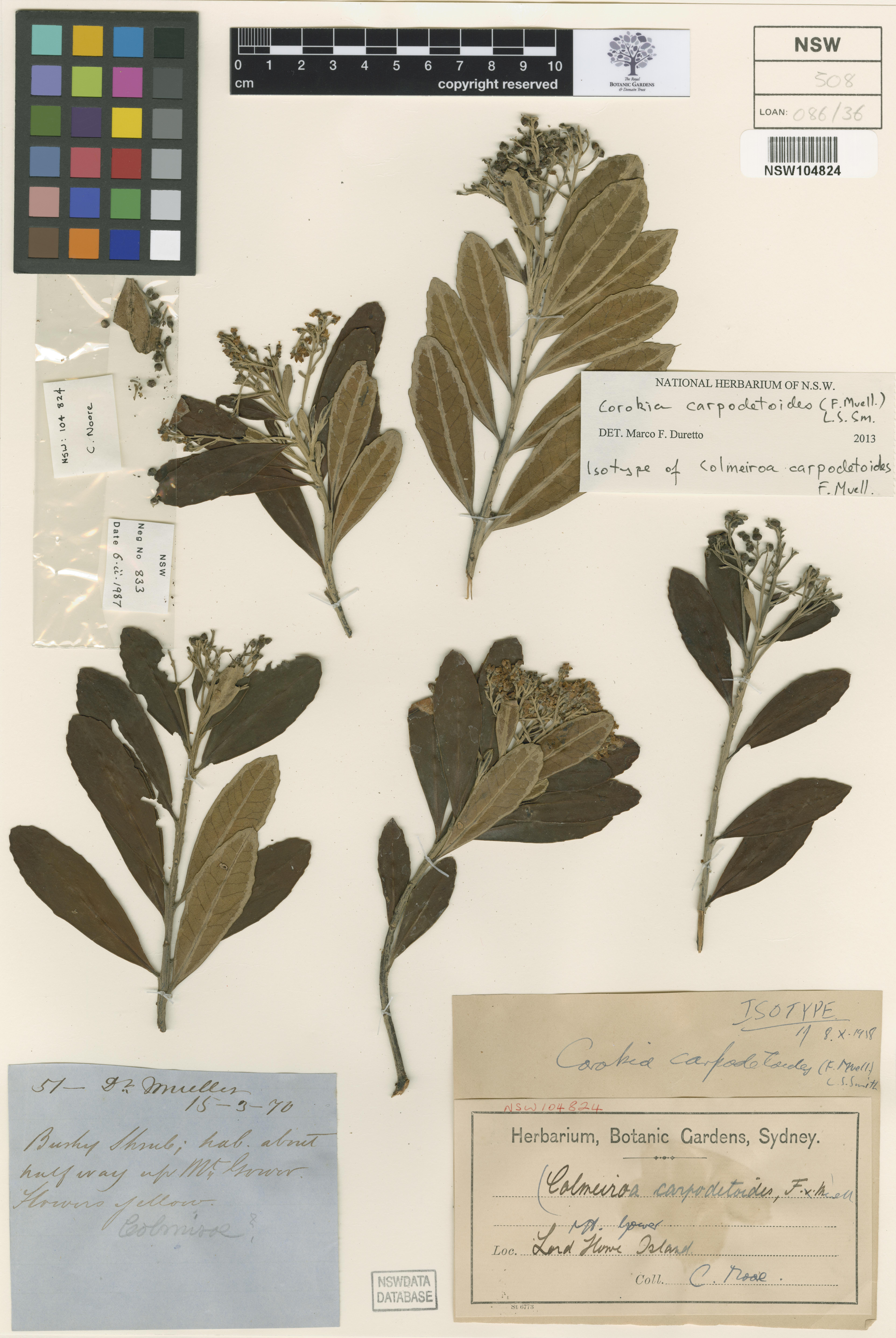

Scientific classification
- Kingdom: Plantae
- Clade: Tracheophytes
- Clade: Angiosperms
- Clade: Eudicots
- Clade: Asterids
- Order: Asterales
- Family: Argophyllaceae
- Genus: Corokia
- Species: C. carpodetoides

Binomial name
- Corokia carpodetoides (F.Muell.) L.S.Sm. (1958)

Synonyms
- Colmeiroa carpodetoides F.Muell. (1871); Paracorokia carpodetoides (F.Muell.) M.Král (1966)

= Corokia carpodetoides =

Species of plant endemic to Australia

Corokia carpodetoides, simply known locally as corokia, is a flowering plant in the Argophyllaceae family. The specific epithet derives from a resemblance to the genus Carpodetus, with the addition of the Latin suffix -oides ('resembling').

== Description ==
It is a shrub, usually growing to about 2 m (6.6 ft) in height, but occasionally up to a tree-like 5 m (16 ft). The young stems have a covering of short, matted hairs. Its narrowly oblanceolate to narrowly elliptic leaves, 2–6 cm (0.8–2.4 in) long and 1–2 cm (0.4–0.8 in) wide, are crowded towards the ends of the branches. The terminal, corymbose inflorescences bear many small yellow flowers. The ovoid fruits are single-seeded and about 3 mm long, becoming brown and dry. The main flowering season is December to January.

== Distribution and habitat ==
The tree is endemic to Australia’s subtropical Lord Howe Island in the Tasman Sea. It is locally common at higher elevations on Mounts Lidgbird and Gower at the southern end of the island.
