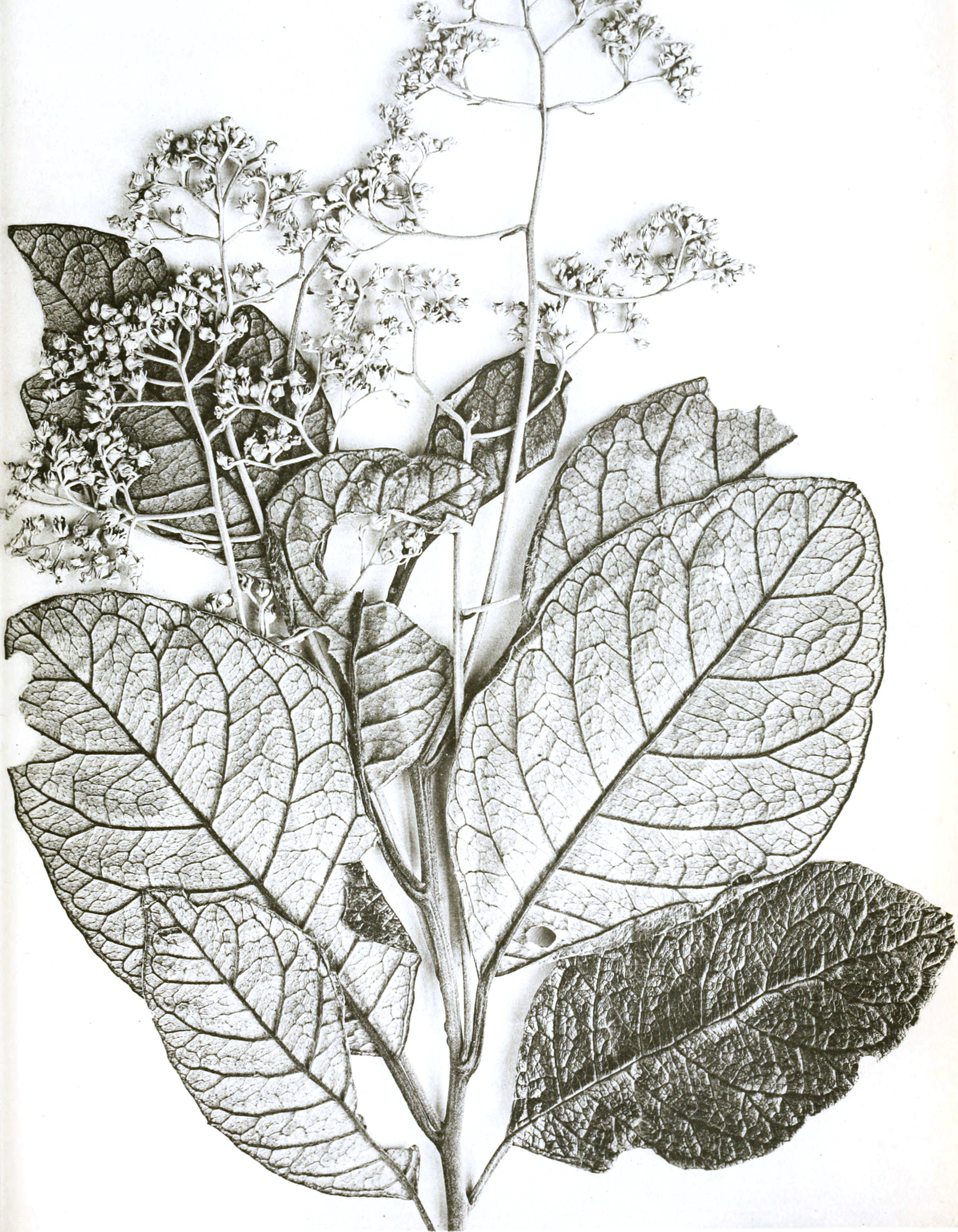

Scientific classification
- Kingdom: Plantae
- Clade: Tracheophytes
- Clade: Angiosperms
- Clade: Eudicots
- Clade: Asterids
- Order: Asterales
- Family: Argophyllaceae
- Genus: Argophyllum
- Species: A. laxum

Binomial name
- Argophyllum laxum Schltr., 1906

= Argophyllum laxum =

Species of flowering plant

Argophyllum laxum is a species of shrub that is endemic to the south of Grande Terre, New Caledonia, where it occurs in dense rainforests and maquis.
