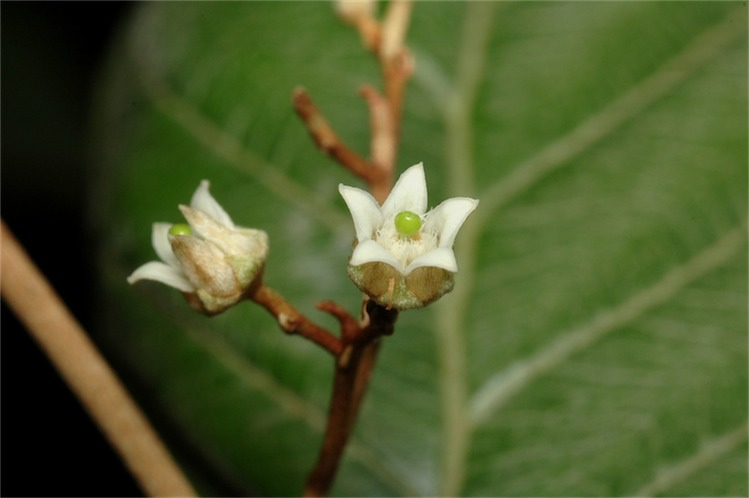
- Flower

Conservation status
- Least Concern (NCA)

Scientific classification
- Kingdom: Plantae
- Clade: Tracheophytes
- Clade: Angiosperms
- Clade: Eudicots
- Clade: Asterids
- Order: Asterales
- Family: Argophyllaceae
- Genus: Argophyllum
- Species: A. lejourdanii

Binomial name
- Argophyllum lejourdanii A.R.Bean & P.I.Forst.

= Argophyllum lejourdanii =

Species of flowering plant

Argophyllum lejourdanii is a plant in the Argophyllaceae family endemic to a part of north eastern Queensland, Australia. It was described and named in 1863.

== Taxonomy ==
This species was first described (as A. lejourdani) in 1863 by the German-born Australian botanist Ferdinand von Mueller who published it in his work Fragmenta Phytographiae Australiae. In a 1900 review published in The Queensland Flora, Frederick Manson Bailey described a new subspecies L. l. var. cryptophleba and respelled the species epithet with an extra "i", making it lejourdanii, presumably as a correction of the Latin grammar. More than a hundred years later, Anthony Bean and Paul Forster conducted a wide-scale review of the genus in which they redefined A. lejourdanii and described seven new species—including promoting A. l. var. cryptophleba to species status as Argophyllum cryptophlebum. They publishing their findings in the Journal Austrobaileya in 2018.

The type specimen for this species was collected in 1863 in the Kennedy District of north Queensland by John Dallachy.

=== Etymology ===
The genus name Argophyllum is derived from Ancient Greek Árgos meaning white or shining, and phúllon meaning leaf. It refers to the white colouration of the underside of the leaves. The species epithet lejourdanii is named for Alfred Lejourdan who was one of Mueller's correspondents.

== Distribution and habitat ==
A. lejourdanii is endemic to north eastern Queensland, from Murray Falls near Cardwell north to Mount Elliot south of Townsville, at elevations ranging from 100 to 600 m (330 to 1,970 ft). It usually inhabits open forest but is also found on the edges of rainforest, near rocky outcrops, and along stream margins.

== Conservation ==
This species is listed by the Queensland Department of Environment and Science as least concern. As of 26 August 2021, it has not been assessed by the IUCN.
