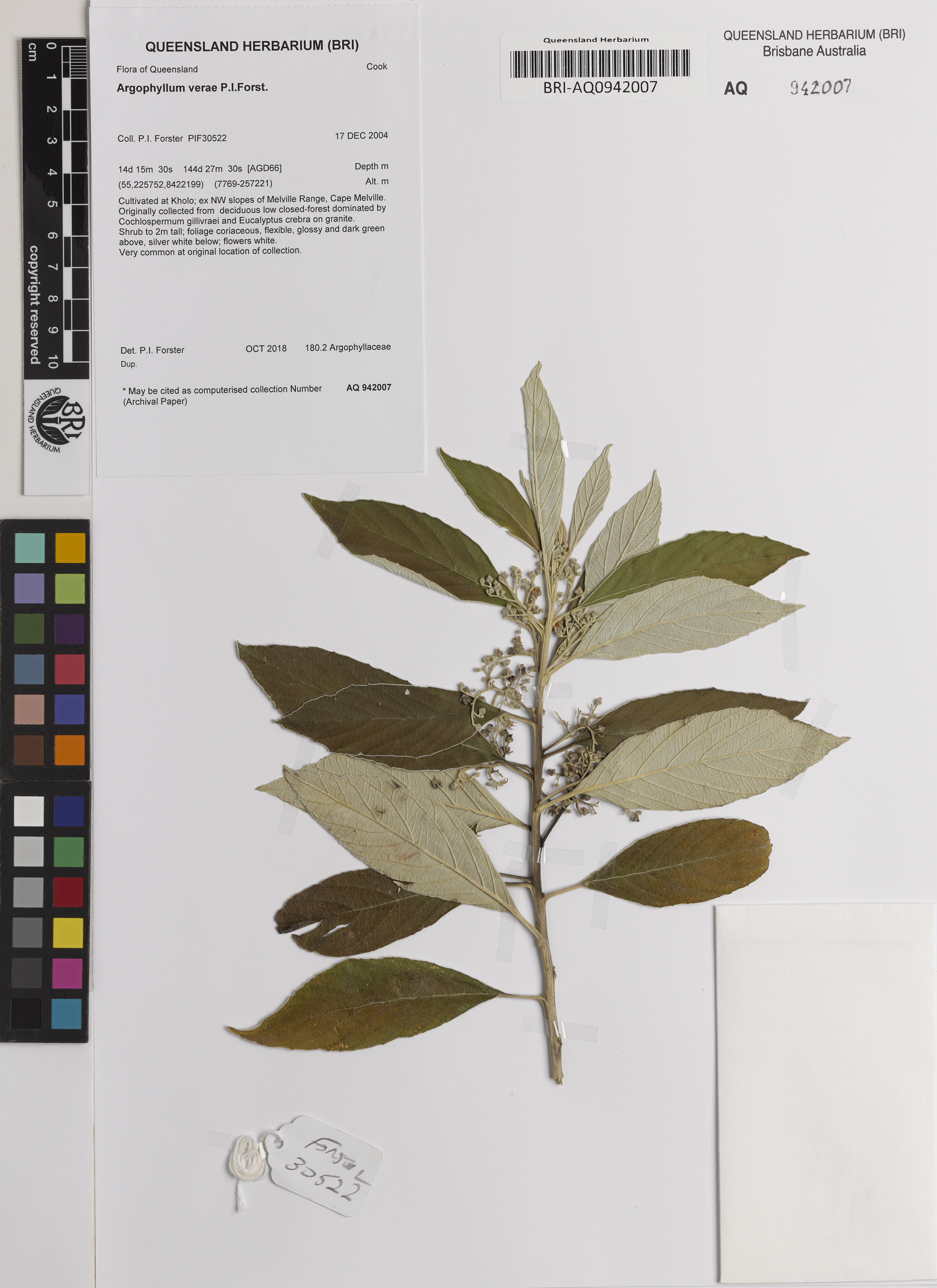
- Herbarium sheet

Conservation status
- Vulnerable (NCA)

Scientific classification
- Kingdom: Plantae
- Clade: Tracheophytes
- Clade: Angiosperms
- Clade: Eudicots
- Clade: Asterids
- Order: Asterales
- Family: Argophyllaceae
- Genus: Argophyllum
- Species: A. verae

Binomial name
- Argophyllum verae P.I.Forst.

= Argophyllum verae =

Species of flowering plant

Argophyllum verae is a species of plant in the family Argophyllaceae endemic to Cape York Peninsula in Queensland, Australia. It is a small shrub growing in rocky conditions on forest margins. It was first described in 1990 and has been given the conservation status of vulnerable.

== Description ==
=== Stem and foliage ===
Argophyllum verae is a perennial shrub to 3 m (9.8 ft) tall, with a dense covering of white hairs on the stems. Leaves are alternate and broadly elliptic. The underside of the leaves are densely covered in white silky hairs, making them appear glossy white.

=== Flowers ===
The flowers are borne on paniculate inflorescences arising in the leaf axils. Individual flowers are about 4 mm (0.16 in) diameter, with five petals about 2.3 mm (0.09 in) long and five sepals about 2.5 mm (0.10 in) long. They have four fused ovaries and two styles. Most parts of the inflorescence are hairy.

=== Fruit ===
The fruit is a densely hairy capsule containing numerous seeds about 0.5 mm (0.02 in) long.

== Taxonomy ==
The species was described by Australian botanist Paul Irwin Forster after collecting specimens of the plant during an exploration of the area near Moreton Telegraph Station at the top of Cape York Peninsula. The description was published in the journal Austrobaileya in 1990.

=== Etymology ===
The species epithet verae was chosen by Forster in honour of Vera Scarth-Johnson, a renowned Queensland botanical artist and collector.

== Distribution and habitat ==
Argophyllum verae is known from only a small number of collections (34 as of October 2025) in the northern half of Cape York Peninsula. It occurs in landscapes dominated by sandstone cliffs and gorges, adjacent to areas of rainforest and eucalypt forest.

== Conservation ==
This species is listed as vulnerable under the Queensland Government's Nature Conservation Act. As of October 2025, it has not been assessed by the International Union for Conservation of Nature (IUCN).
