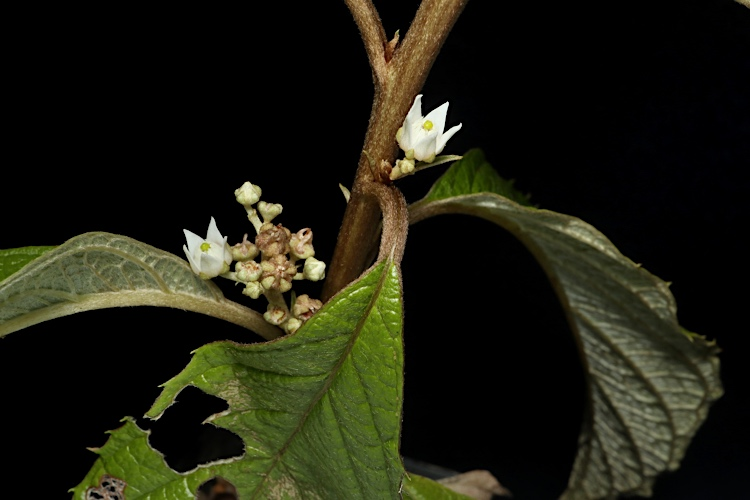
- FLowers

Conservation status
- Least Concern (NCA)

Scientific classification
- Kingdom: Plantae
- Clade: Embryophytes
- Clade: Tracheophytes
- Clade: Spermatophytes
- Clade: Angiosperms
- Clade: Eudicots
- Clade: Asterids
- Order: Asterales
- Family: Argophyllaceae
- Genus: Argophyllum
- Species: A. palumense

Binomial name
- Argophyllum palumense A.R.Bean & P.I.Forst.
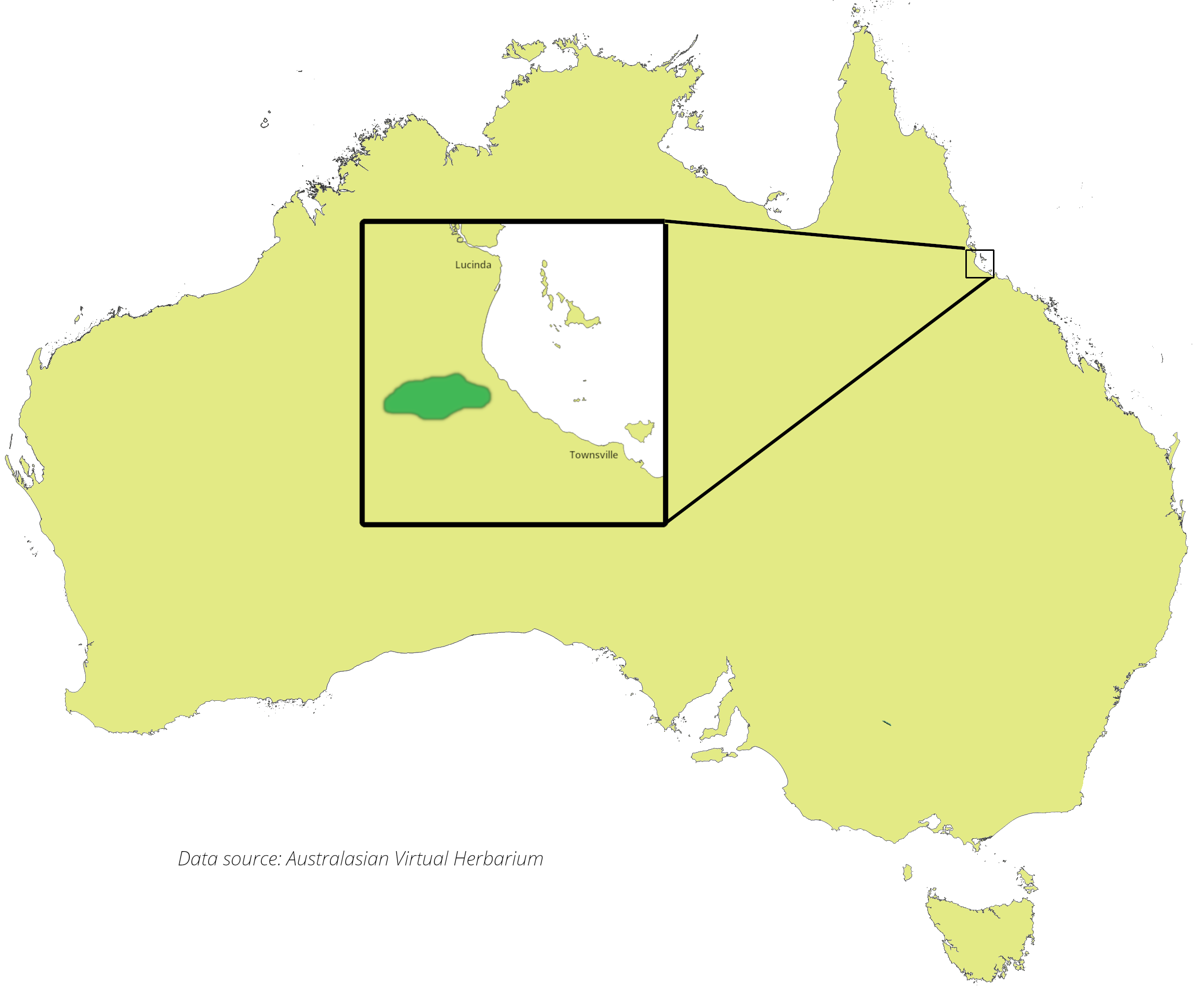

= Argophyllum palumense =

Species of flowering plant

Argophyllum palumense is a plant in the Argophyllaceae family endemic to a small part of north eastern Queensland, Australia. It was described and named in 2018.

== Description ==
Argophyllum palumense is an evergreen shrub or small tree growing up to 6 m (20 ft) tall. The new growth is creamy-white in colour due to a dense covering of pale hairs. The leaves are dark green and sparsely hairy above and silvery below, and they measure up to 18 cm (7.1 in) long by 6 cm (2.4 in) wide. They are arranged alternately on petioles measuring from 2 to 3 cm (0.79 to 1.18 in) long and have 6 to 8 lateral veins on either side of the midrib. The leaf margins (edges) are dentate with up to 60 teeth on each edge. The teeth alternate long and short, with the largest measuring about 3 mm (0.12 in) long.

The much-branched inflorescences are produced from the leaf axils, may be up to 11 cm (4.3 in) long and are densely covered in hairs. Flowers are white with 5 petals, measuring about 1 cm (0.39 in) across.

The fruit is a capsule up to 3.2 mm (0.13 in) long and 4 mm (0.16 in) diameter.

== Taxonomy ==
In 2018 the Australian botanists Anthony Bean and Paul Forster published a review of the Australian members of the genus Argophyllum, with the result that 7 new species – including A. palumense – were described. Their paper, titled "A taxonomic revision of Argophyllum J.R.Forst. & G.Forst. (Argophyllaceae) in Australia", was published in the Queensland Herbarium's journal Austrobaileya. The type specimen was collected in 2009 in the Mount Zero-Taravale Sanctuary by Forster.

=== Etymology ===
The genus name Argophyllum is derived from Ancient Greek Ἄργος (Árgos) meaning white or shining, and φύλλον (phúllon) meaning leaf. It refers to the white colouration of the underside of the leaves. The species epithet palumense refers to the location where this species is found, i.e. in and near to the Paluma Range National Park.

== Distribution and habitat ==
A. palumense is endemic to southern parts of the Wet Tropics of Queensland in mountainous terrain of the Paluma Range National Park, north east of Townsville. It grows on creek banks and hillsides in wet sclerophyll forest, at elevations from 500 to 900 m (1,640 to 2,950 ft), and on soils derived from granite.

== Conservation ==
The taxon authors conceded that there are no immediate threats to this species, but also noted that the available habitat is small and potentially subject to detrimental forces. They suggested that a vulnerable status be applied to the species, however the Queensland Department of Environment and Science has assessed it as least concern. As of 5 November 2023, it has not been assessed by the International Union for Conservation of Nature (IUCN).

== Gallery ==
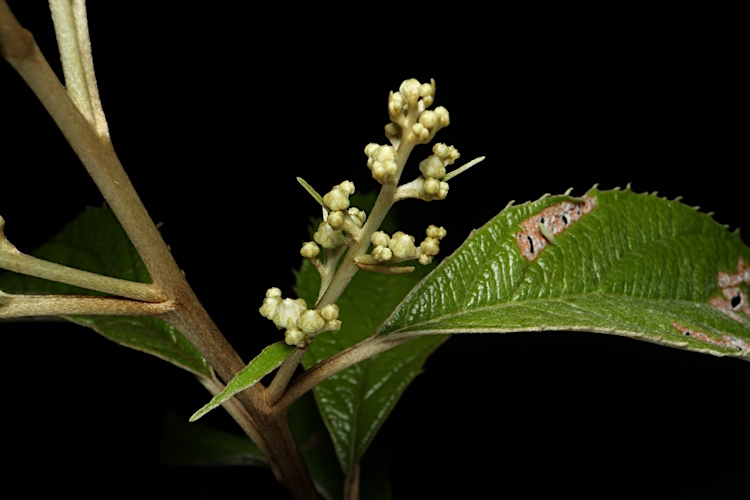
Flower buds

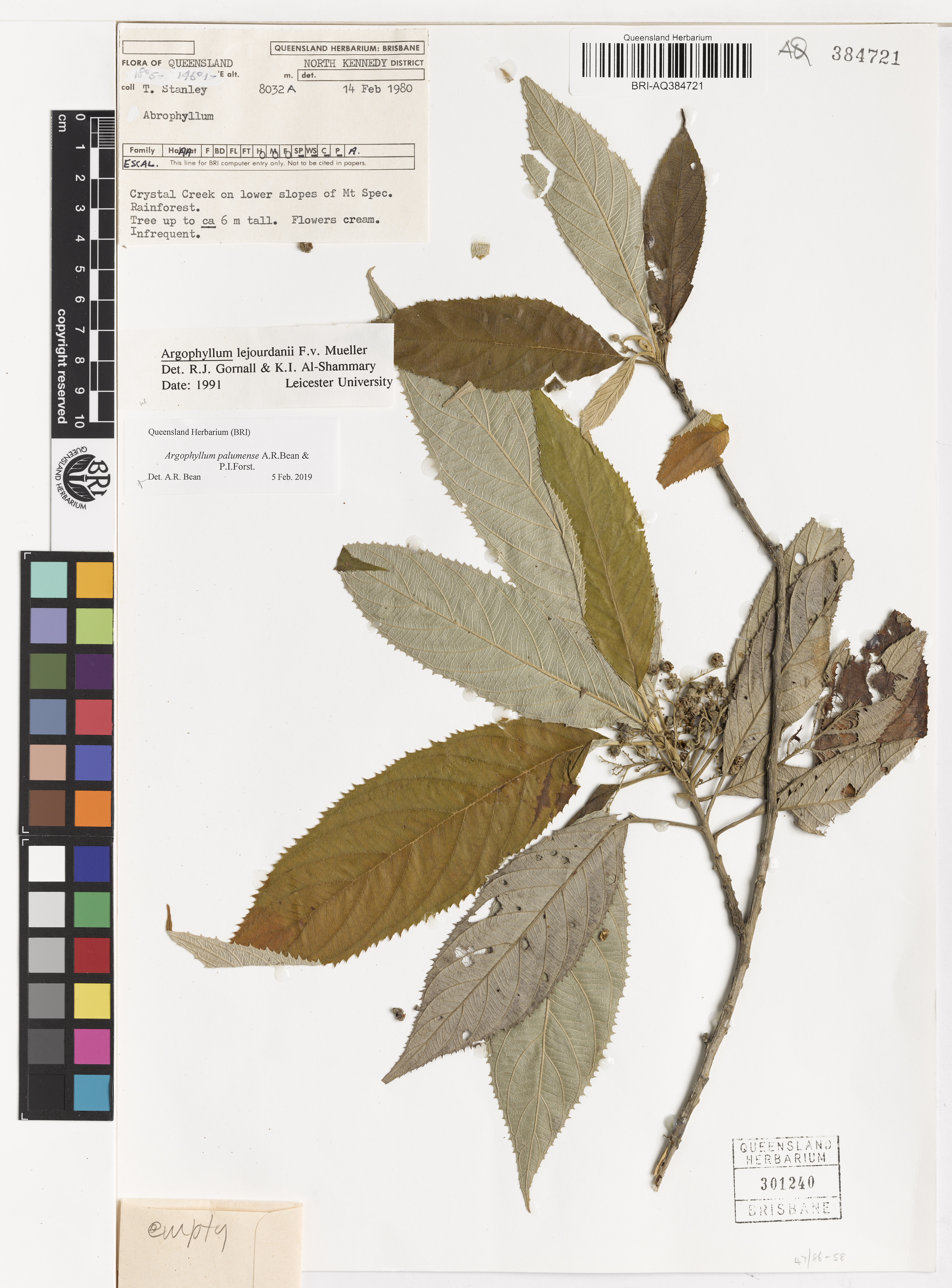
Herbarium specimen
