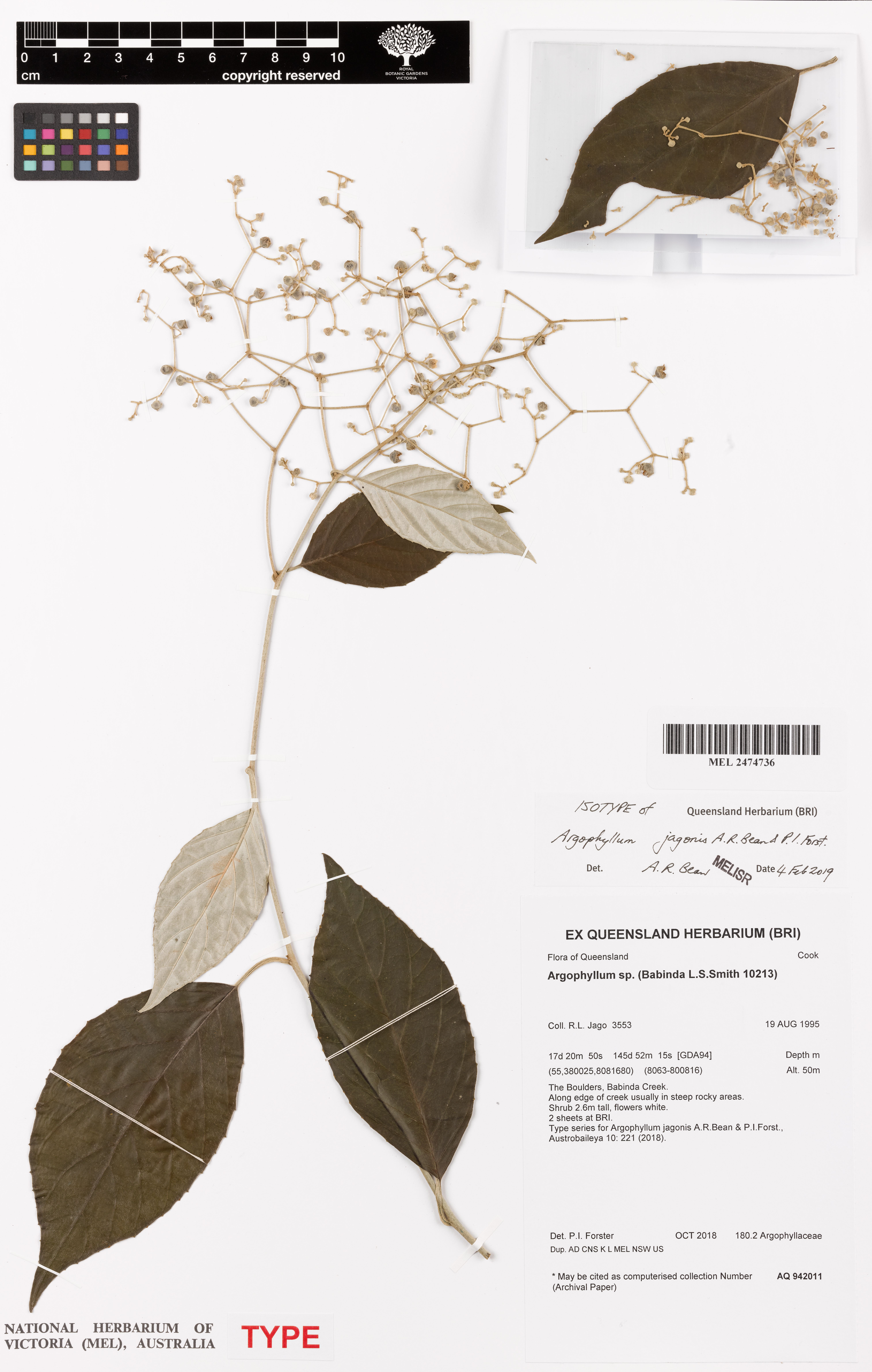
- Herbarium specimen

Conservation status
- Least Concern (NCA)

Scientific classification
- Kingdom: Plantae
- Clade: Tracheophytes
- Clade: Angiosperms
- Clade: Eudicots
- Clade: Asterids
- Order: Asterales
- Family: Argophyllaceae
- Genus: Argophyllum
- Species: A. jagonis

Binomial name
- Argophyllum jagonis A.R.Bean

= Argophyllum jagonis =

Species of flowering plant

Argophyllum jagonis is a species of plant in the family Argophyllaceae native to the Wet Tropics bioregion of Queensland, Australia. It is a shrub to about 3 m (9.8 ft) tall which inhabits stream banks in rainforest in the area from Edmonton to Innisfail.
