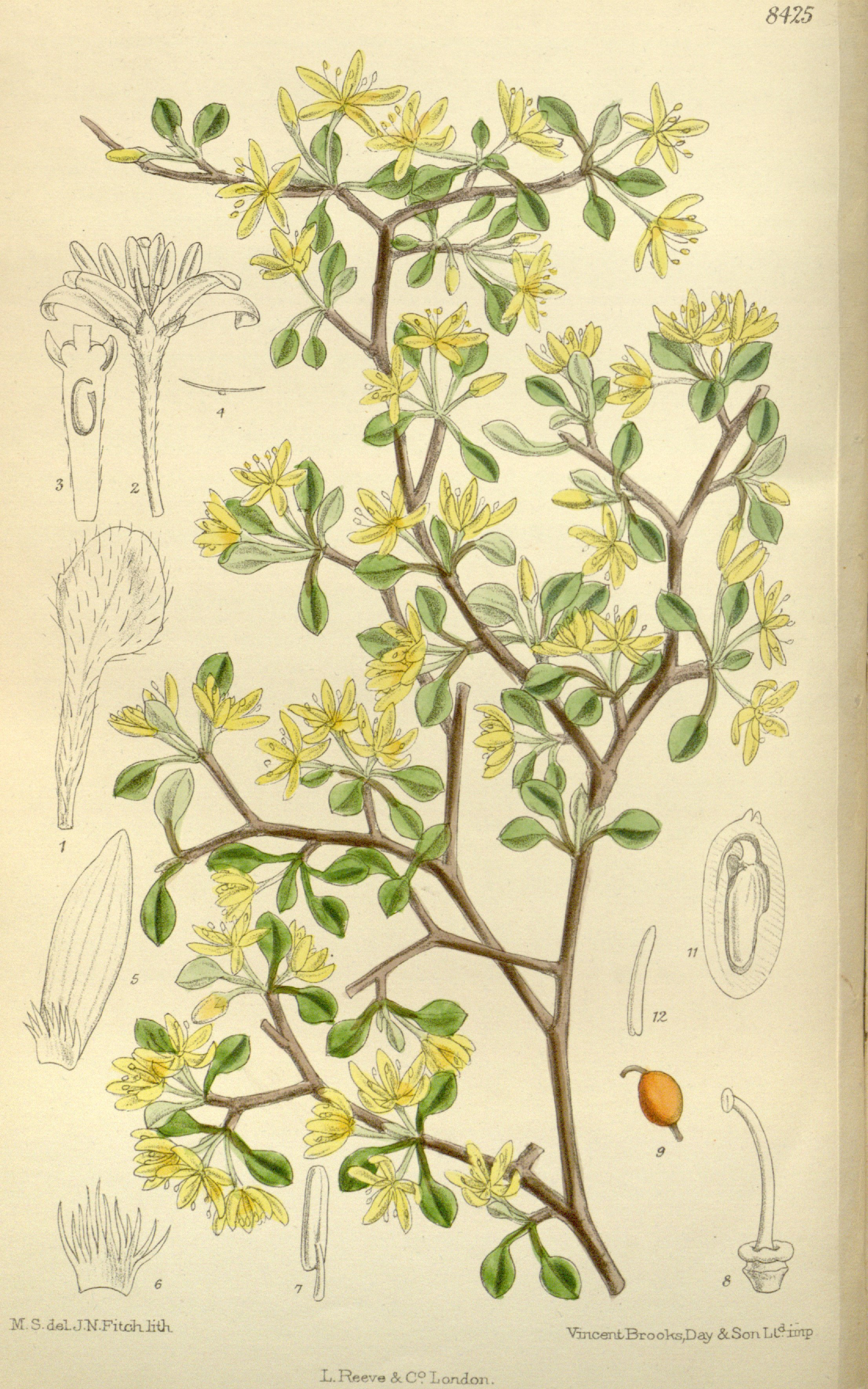

Scientific classification
- Kingdom: Plantae
- Clade: Tracheophytes
- Clade: Angiosperms
- Clade: Eudicots
- Clade: Asterids
- Order: Asterales
- Family: Argophyllaceae
- Genus: Corokia
- Species: C. cotoneaster

Binomial name
- Corokia cotoneaster Raoul (1846)

= Corokia cotoneaster =

Species of flowering plant

Corokia cotoneaster is a flowering plant in the family Argophyllaceae was described by Étienne Fiacre Louis Raoul in 1846. This plant is commonly known as the wire-netting bush, korokio, or korokia-tarango. The word "koriko" comes from the Māori language.

== Identifications ==
Corokia cotoneaster is a highly branched shrub with a strongly divaricating habit with rough dark-coloured bark, usually growing to about 3 m in height. Common variable shrubs with thin gray "zig-zag" twigs that contain small white clusters underneath with dented or rounded edges and on flat, black petioles. Yellow flowers, star-shaped and red fruits. The leaves are variable, depending on altitude and to the degree of exposure to wind, and are obvo-cuneate to obovate-oblong in shape, 2–15 cm long and 1–10 cm wide. The leaves of juveniles are long and spathulate with 3 lobes. Flowers are borne in leaf axils or terminally in groups of 2 to 4 flowers with bright yellow petals. The main flowering season is December to January.

== Gallery ==
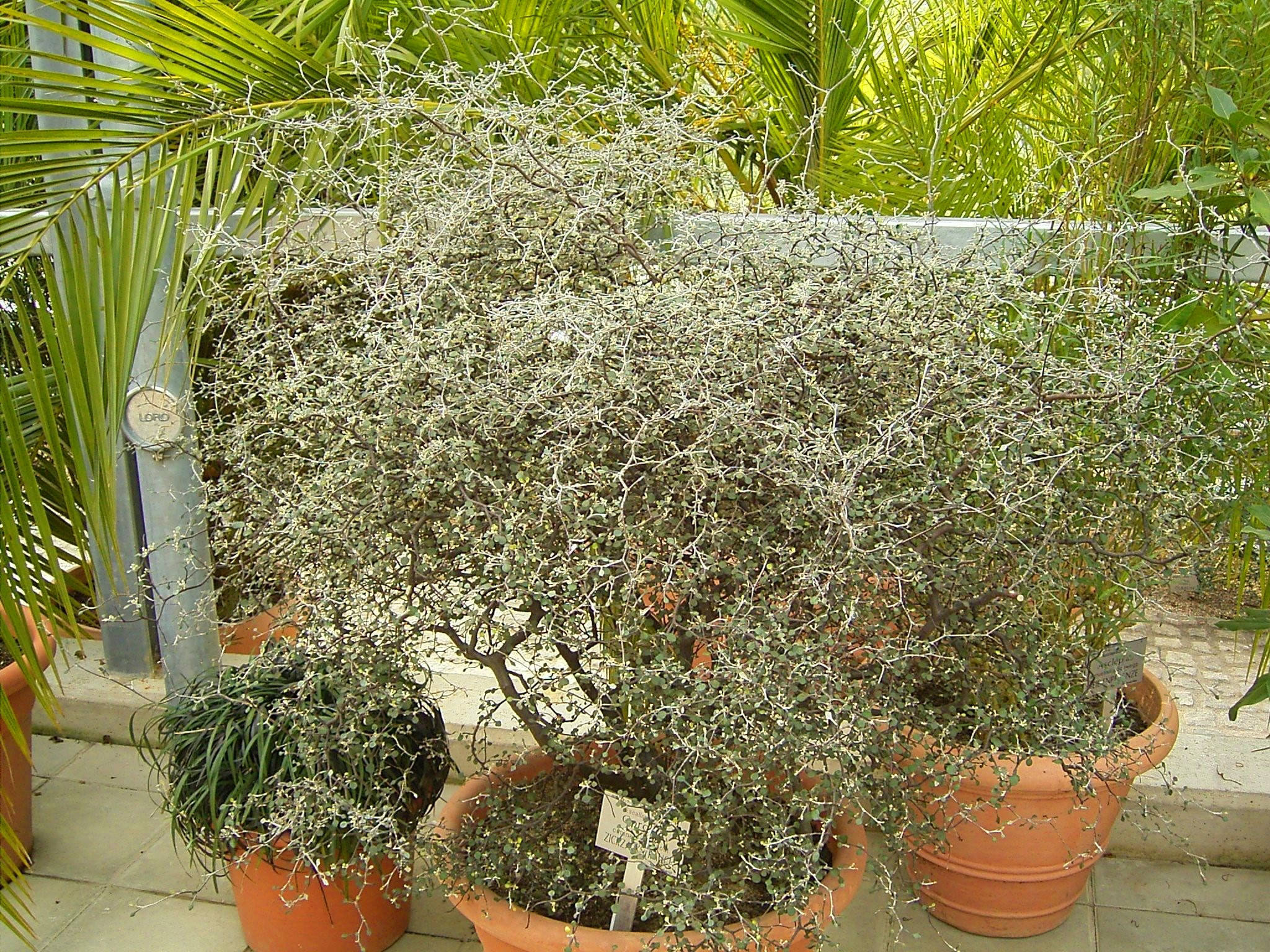

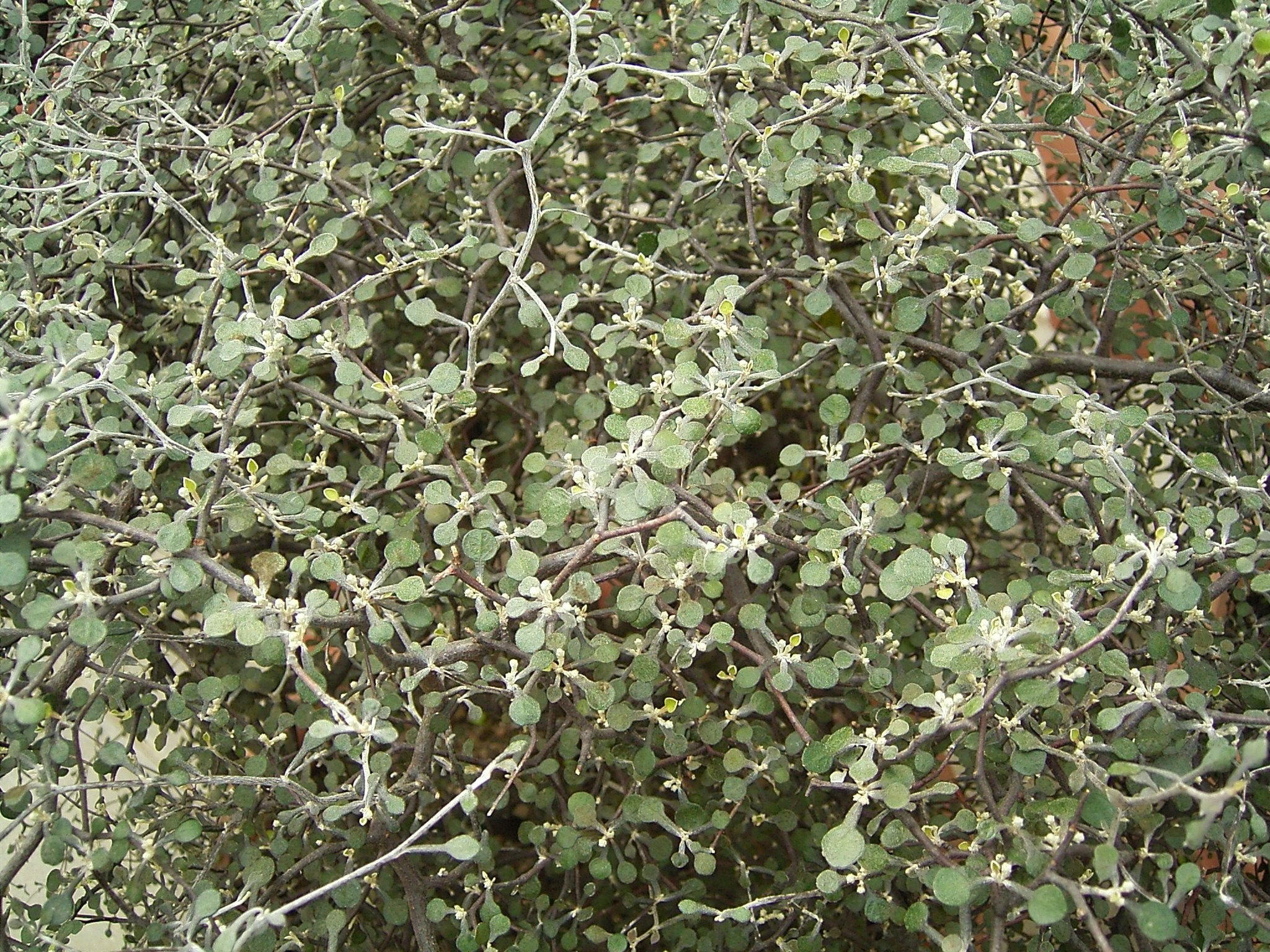

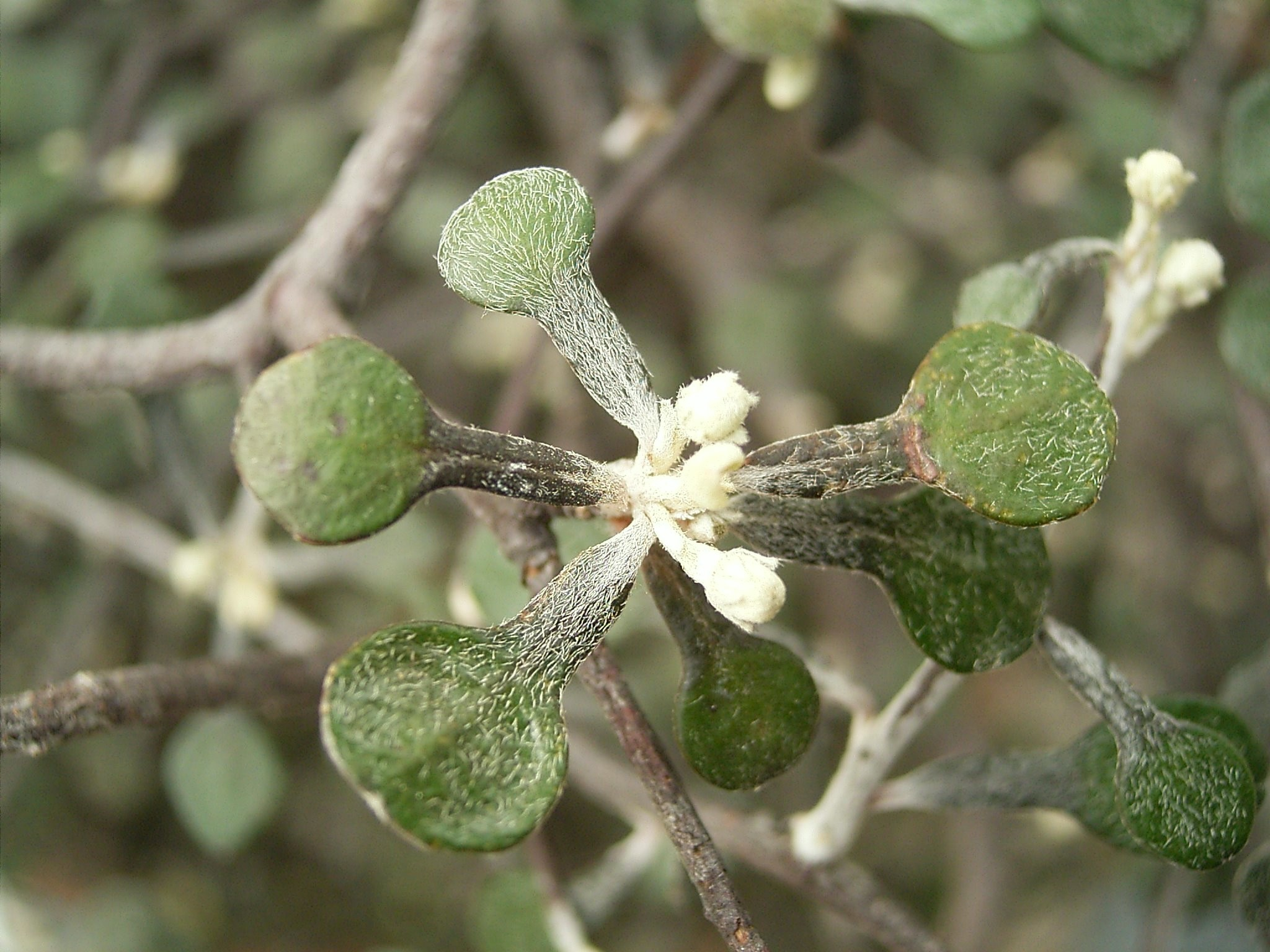

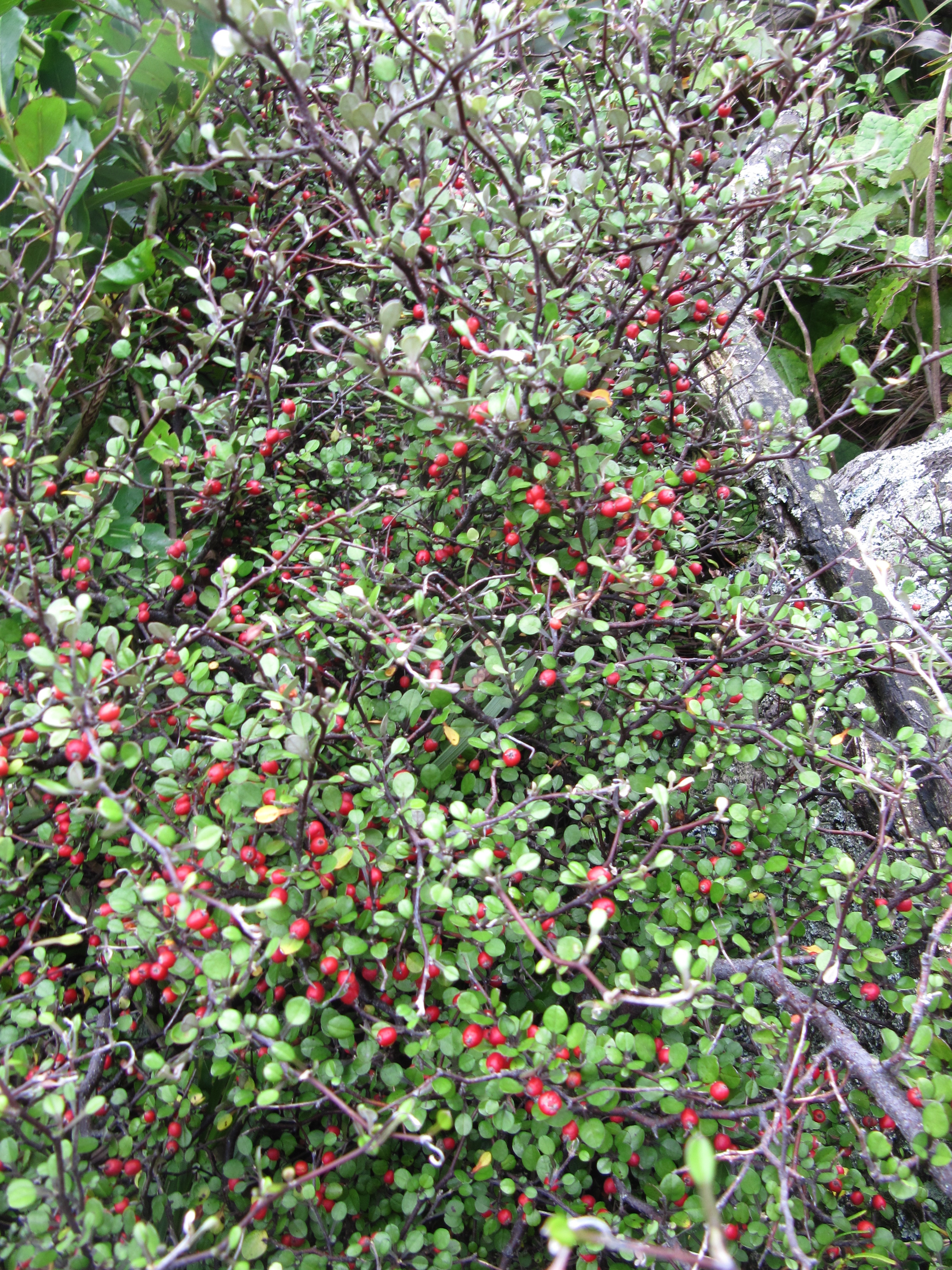

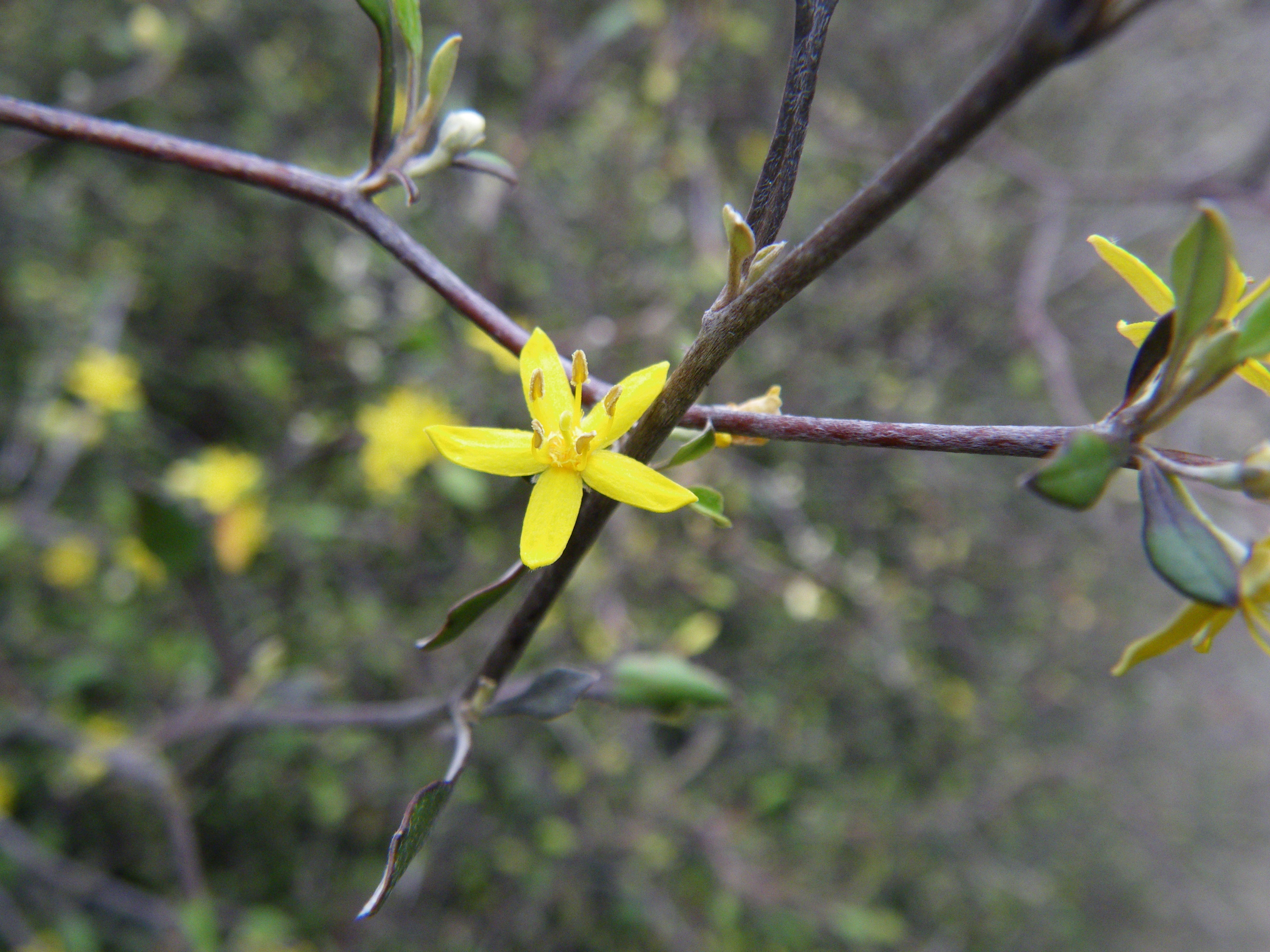
