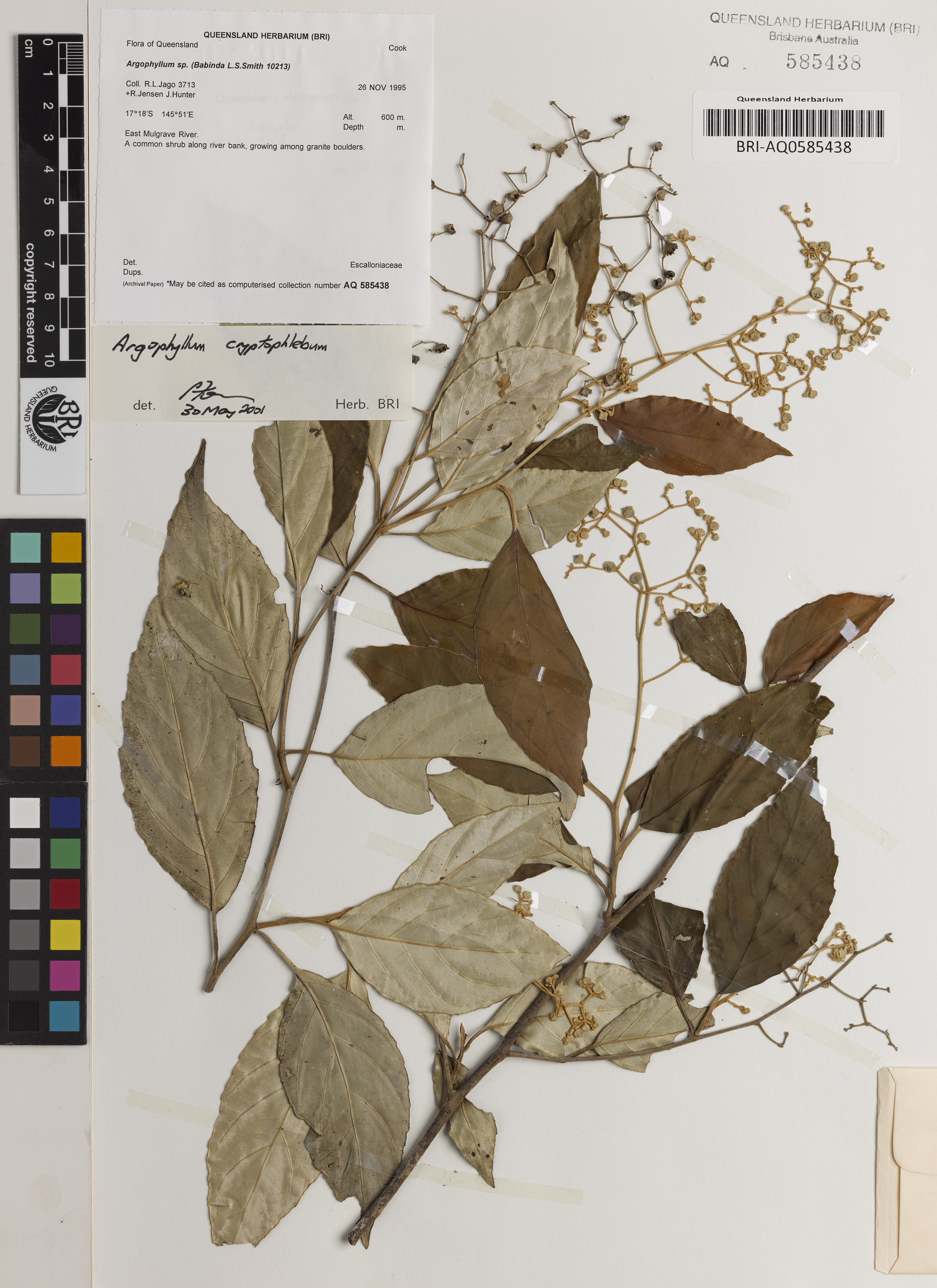
- Specimen held at Queensland Herbarium

Conservation status
- Near Threatened (NCA)

Scientific classification
- Kingdom: Plantae
- Clade: Tracheophytes
- Clade: Angiosperms
- Clade: Eudicots
- Clade: Asterids
- Order: Asterales
- Family: Argophyllaceae
- Genus: Argophyllum
- Species: A. cryptophlebum

Binomial name
- Argophyllum cryptophlebum Zemann
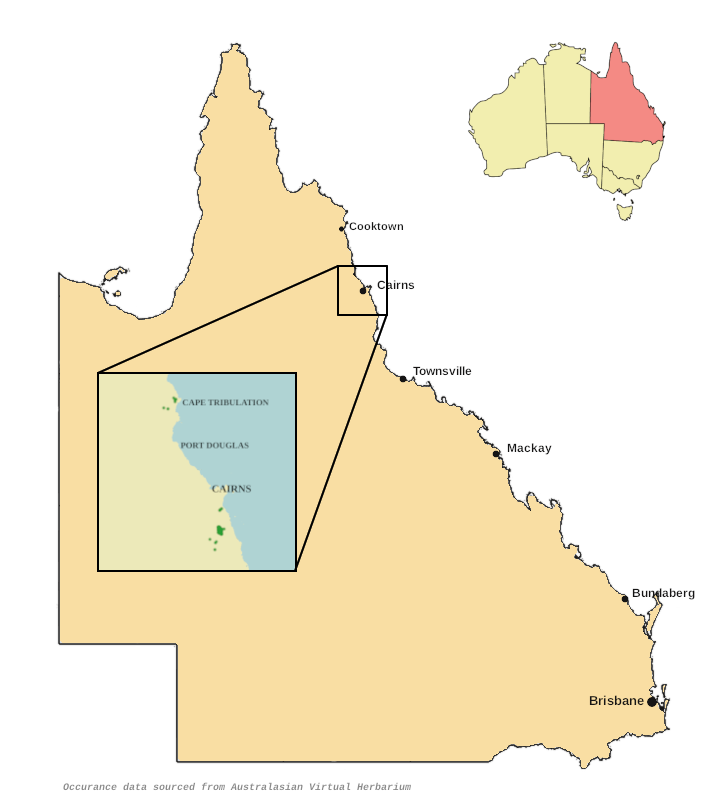

Synonyms
- Argophyllum nitidum var. fulvum F.M.Bailey

= Argophyllum cryptophlebum =

Species of flowering plant

Argophyllum cryptophlebum is a plant in the Argophyllaceae family of the order Asterales, which is endemic to a small part of north eastern Queensland. It was described and named in 1907.

== Description ==
Argophyllum cryptophlebum is an evergreen shrub growing up to 7 m (23 ft) tall. The new growth is rusty-brown in colour due to a dense covering of hairs. The leaves are dark green and hairless above and silvery below, and they measure up to 13 cm (5.1 in) long by 6 cm (2.4 in) wide. They are arranged alternately, and held on petioles measuring from 1.3 to 3.8 cm (0.51 to 1.50 in) long. They each have 6 to 9 lateral veins on either side of the midrib, and the leaf blades are broadly elliptic to broadly ovate in shape. The leaf margins (edges) are finely toothed with between 7 and 14 teeth on either edge measuring up to 0.8 mm (0.031 in) long.

The inflorescence is produced terminally, is much branched and densely hairy, and measures up to 12 cm (4.7 in) long. Flowers are white with petals about 2.5 mm (0.098 in) long. The fruit is a capsule about 3.5 mm (0.14 in) long and 4 mm (0.16 in) wide.

=== Phenology ===
Flowering has been recorded from July to December, and fruit have been observed from March to December.

== Taxonomy ==
This species was first described in 1900 by the Australian botanist Frederick Manson Bailey as Argophyllum nitidum var. fulvum. His description was based on material collected on the slopes of Mount Bellenden Ker in 1887 by W.A. Sayer, and it was published in his work The Queensland Flora. In 1907 the species was given its current combination by the Austrian botanist Margarete Zemann.

In a 2018 paper by botanists Anthony Russell Bean and Paul Irwin Forster, the genus Argophyllum in Australia was reviewed and the combination Argophyllum cryptophlebum was maintained. A lectotype for the species was also nominated in the paper.

=== Etymology ===
The genus name Argophyllum is constructed from the Ancient Greek words Ἄργος (argós), meaning bright or shining, and φύλλον (phúllon), meaning leaf. It refers to the shiny undersides of the leaves of the genus. The species epithet cryptophlebum is also from Ancient Greek words, namely κρυπτός (krúptō), meaning hidden, and φλέψ (phléps), meaning vein. It is unclear what Zemann was referring to but it is likely to be the obscure tertiary venation.

== Distribution and habitat ==
This species is found in very small areas within the Wet Tropics of northeastern Queensland, north and south of Cairns. It has strict requirements of high rainfall (above 3,000 mm (120 in) p.a.), altitude above 600 m (2,000 ft), and soils derived from granite. Correspondingly it is only found in two localities: the Cape Tribulation area (approximately 95 km (59 mi) north of Cairns, and in the high coastal ranges immediately south of Cairns. In both localities it grows in and on the margins of highland rainforest and alongside creeks. The species' area of occupancy is calculated to be just 88 km^{2} (34 sq mi).

== Conservation ==
This species is listed by the Queensland Department of Environment and Science as near threatened. As of 19 January 2024, it has not been assessed by the International Union for Conservation of Nature (IUCN).

== Gallery ==
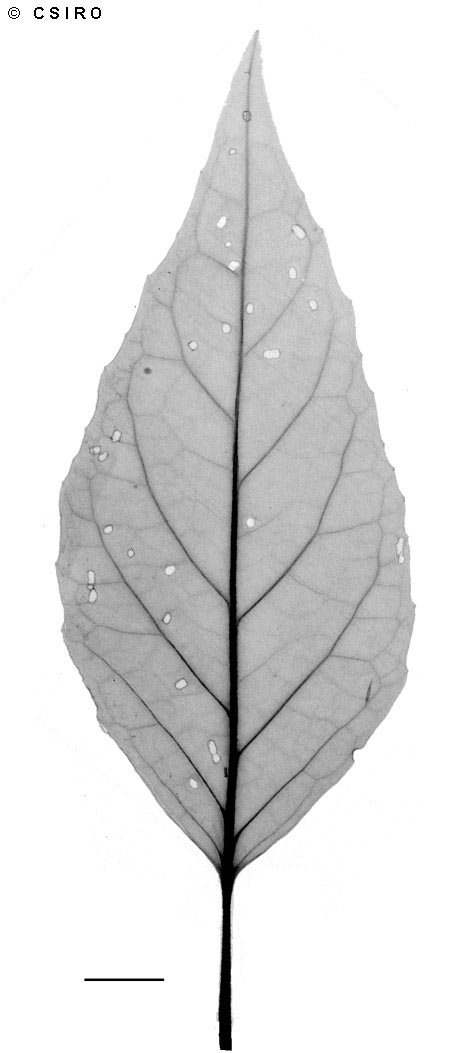
X-ray of leaf

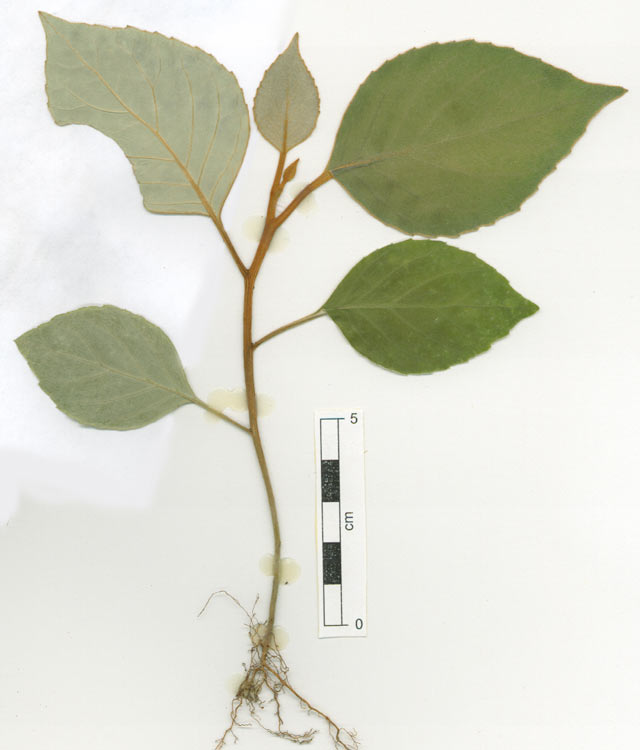
Seedling
