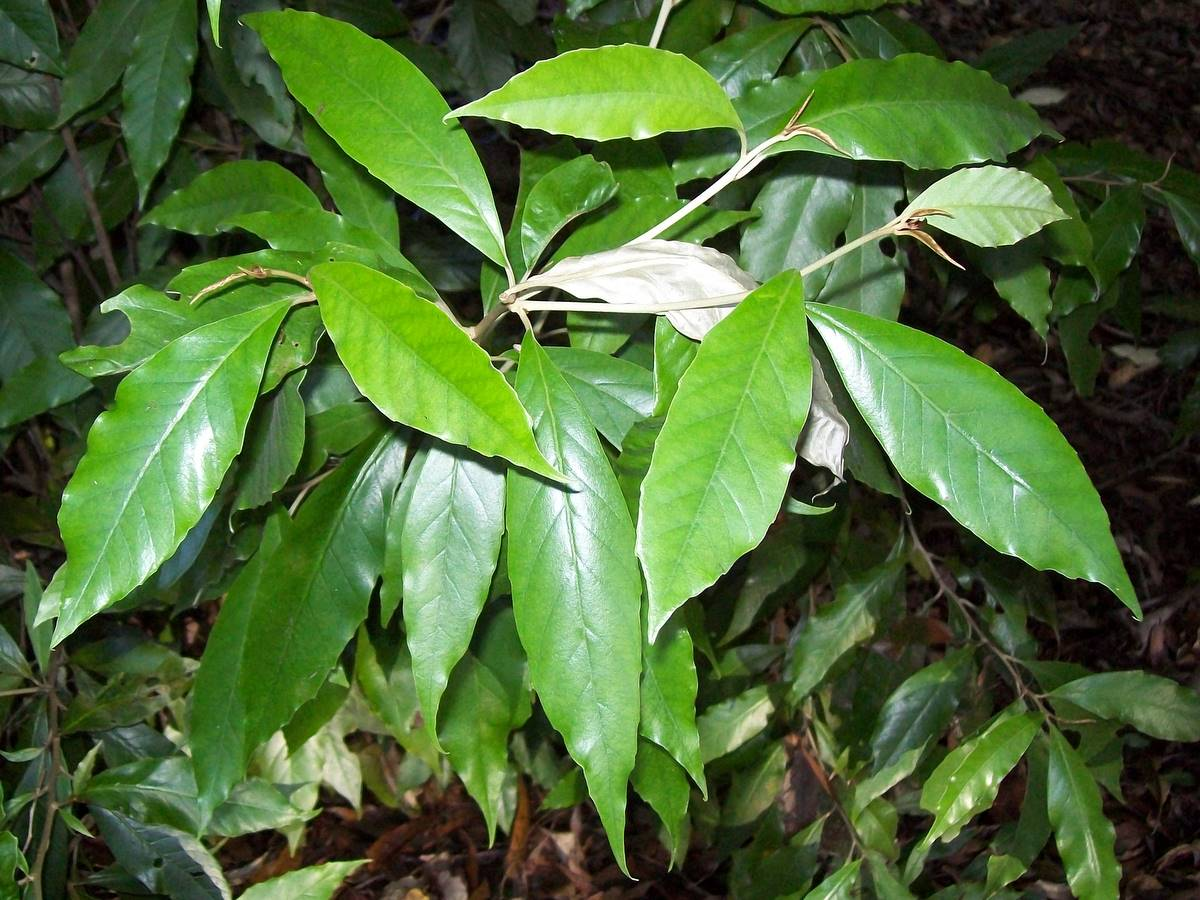
- Argophyllum nullumense

Scientific classification
- Kingdom: Plantae
- Clade: Embryophytes
- Clade: Tracheophytes
- Clade: Angiosperms
- Clade: Eudicots
- Clade: Asterids
- Order: Asterales
- Family: Argophyllaceae
- Genus: Argophyllum; J.R.Forst. & G.Forst.

Species
- See text

= Argophyllum =

Genus of flowering plants

Argophyllum is a genus in the Argophyllaceae family comprising eighteen species of shrubs and small trees. They feature alternate, simple leaves, often silvery white underneath. They appear in Australia and New Caledonia, where several species are nickel hyperaccumulators.

== Species ==
- Argophyllum brevipetalum (New Caledonia)
- Argophyllum cryptophlebum (Australia)
- Argophyllum curtum (Australia)
- Argophyllum ellipticum (New Caledonia)
- Argophyllum ferrugineum (Australia)
- Argophyllum grunowii (New Caledonia)
- Argophyllum heterodontum (Australia)
- Argophyllum iridescens (Australia)
- Argophyllum jagonis (Australia)
- Argophyllum laxum (New Caledonia)
- Argophyllum lejourdanii (Australia)
- Argophyllum loxotrichum (Australia)
- Argophyllum montanum (New Caledonia)
- Argophyllum nitidum (New Caledonia)
- Argophyllum nullumense (Australia)
- Argophyllum palumense (Australia)
- Argophyllum riparium (New Caledonia)
- Argophyllum verae (Australia)
- Argophyllum vernicosum (New Caledonia)
