= Argophyllum iridescens =

Conservation status
- Least Concern (NCA)

Scientific classification
- Kingdom: Plantae
- Clade: Embryophytes
- Clade: Tracheophytes
- Clade: Spermatophytes
- Clade: Angiosperms
- Clade: Eudicots
- Clade: Asterids
- Order: Asterales
- Family: Argophyllaceae
- Genus: Argophyllum
- Species: A. iridescens

Binomial name
- Argophyllum iridescens A.R.Bean & P.I.Forst.

Species of flowering plant

Argophyllum iridescens is a plant in the Argophyllaceae family endemic to a small part of north eastern Queensland, Australia. It was described and named in 2018.

== Taxonomy ==
This species was first described, along with a number of other new species in this genus, in 2018 by the Australian botanists Anthony Bean and Paul Forster who published it in the Journal Austrobaileya. The type specimen was collected by Forster in 1999 at Mount Hedly, near Rossville, Queensland.

=== Etymology ===
The genus name Argophyllum is derived from Ancient Greek Árgos meaning white or shining, and phúllon meaning leaf. It refers to the white colouration of the underside of the leaves. The species epithet iridescens is from the Latin iridēscēns (iridescent), referring to very shiny undersurface of the leaves.

== Distribution and habitat ==
A. iridescens is restricted to two small disjunct populations in the Wet Tropics of Queensland. The more northerly population occurs around Mount Hedly, south of Cooktown; the other is in the vicinity of Noah Creek, between the Daintree River and Cape Tribulation. It inhabits granite outcrops on the margins of rainforest at elevations between 400 and 500 m (1,310 and 1,640 ft).

== Conservation ==
This species is listed by the Queensland Department of Environment and Science as least concern. As of 30 August 2021, it has not been assessed by the IUCN.
