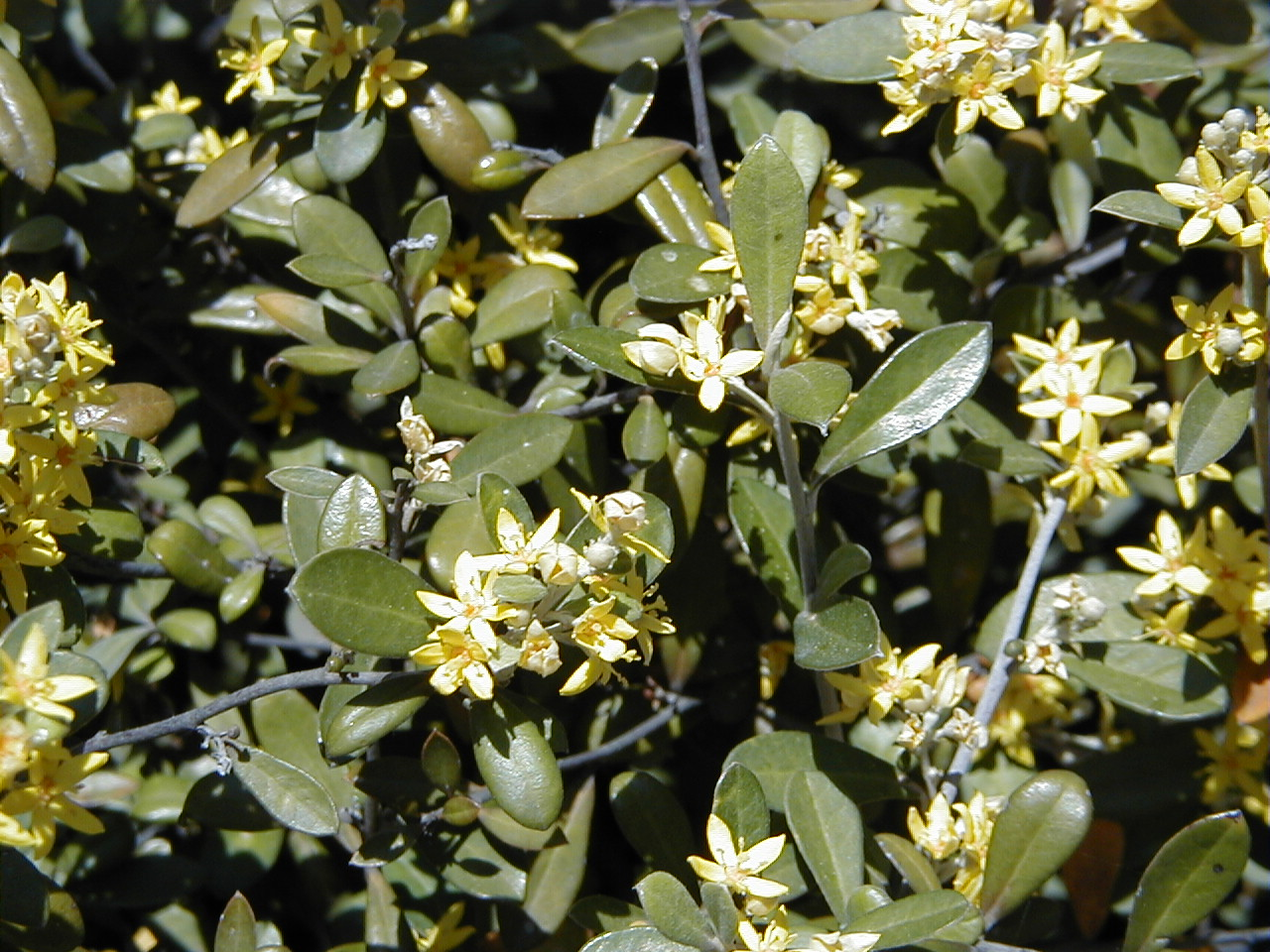
- Corokia x virgata

Scientific classification
- Kingdom: Plantae
- Clade: Embryophytes
- Clade: Tracheophytes
- Clade: Spermatophytes
- Clade: Angiosperms
- Clade: Eudicots
- Clade: Asterids
- Order: Asterales
- Family: Argophyllaceae
- Genus: Corokia; A.Cunn.

Species
- See text

= Corokia =

Genus of flowering plants

Corokia is a genus in the Argophyllaceae family. The genus was first described in 1839. It comprises six species native to New Zealand, Australia and Rapa Iti. Corokia species are shrubs or small trees with zigzagging (divaricating) branches. Corokia cotoneaster is commonly known as wire-netting bush. The stems of the shrubs are dark when mature, covered with downy or silky hairs (tomentum) when young. In spring, they produce clusters of small, star-shaped yellow blossoms. The berries are red or yellow. The shrubs prefer forests and rocky areas, sun or light shade, reasonably well drained soil, and moderate watering.

== Species ==
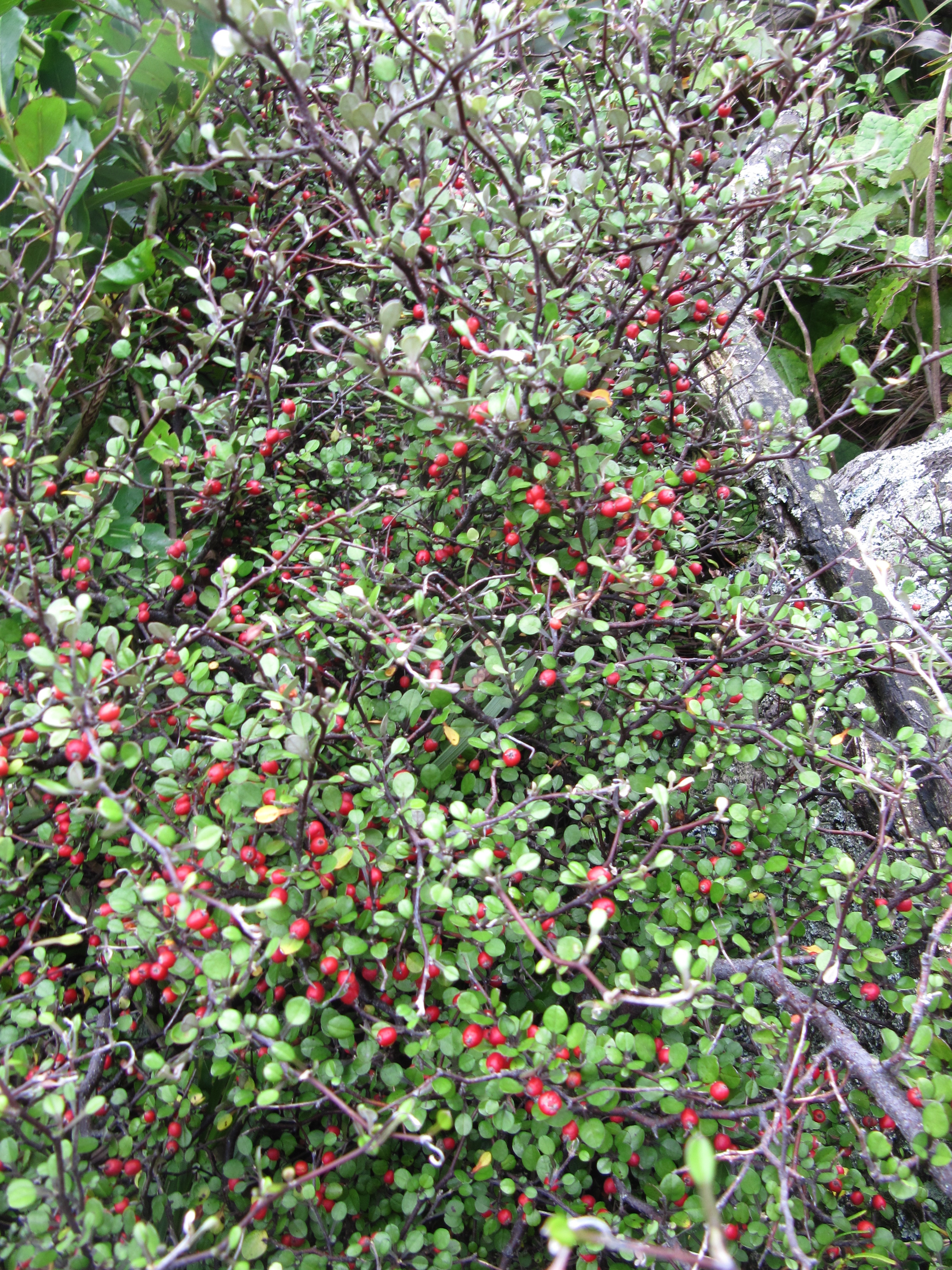
Corokia cotoneaster berries beside the track into Te Toto Gorge, Raglan, New Zealand in March

Species found in the genus include:

- Corokia buddleioides A.Cunn. (New Zealand, North Island)
- Corokia carpodetoides ( F.Muell. ) L.S.Sm. (Lord Howe Island)
- Corokia collenettei Riley (Rapa Iti)
- Corokia cotoneaster Raoul (New Zealand)
- Corokia macrocarpa Kirk (Chatham Islands)
- Corokia whiteana L.S.Sm. (Australia, New South Wales)
