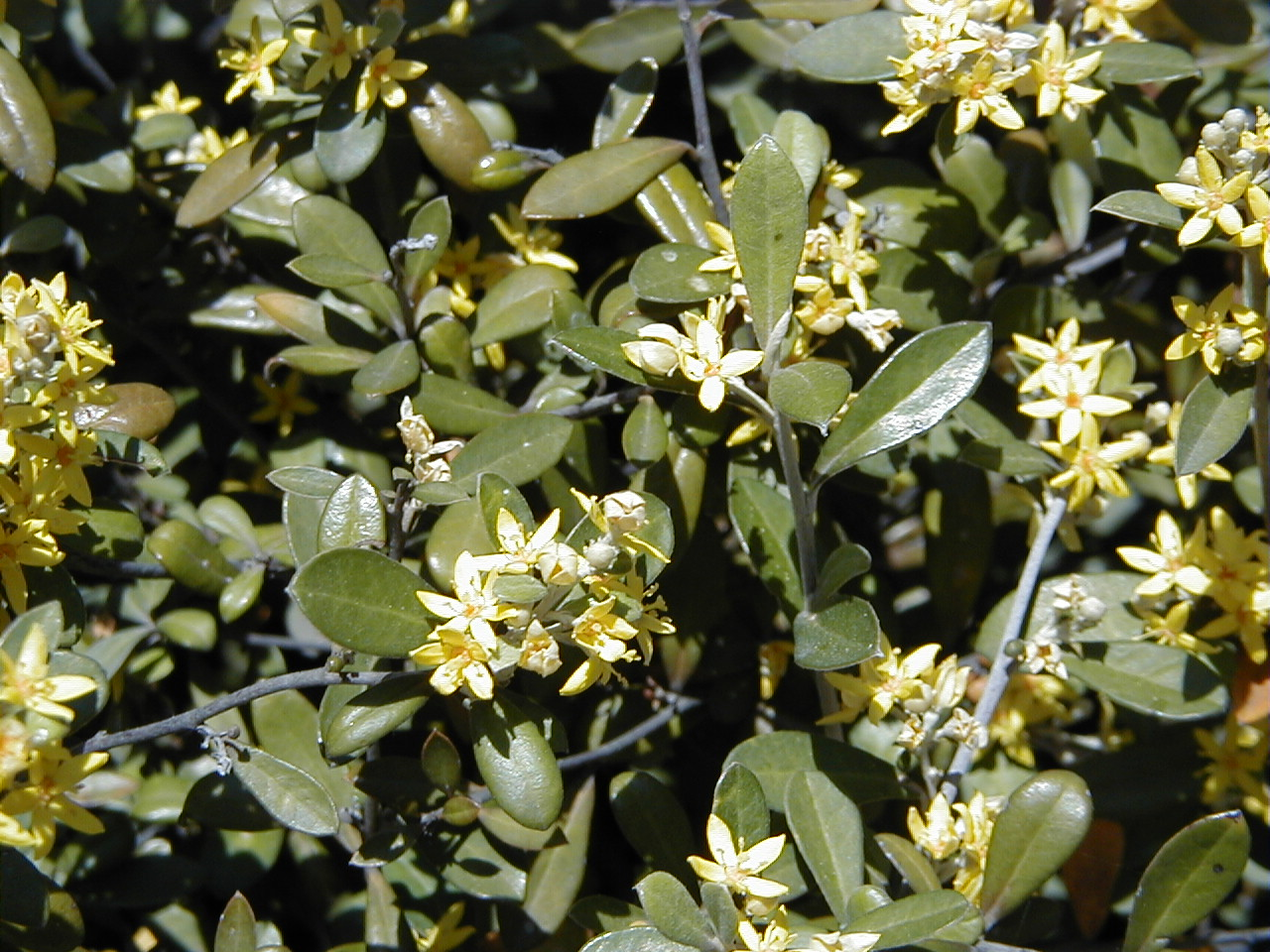
- Corokia virgata

Scientific classification
- Kingdom: Plantae
- Clade: Tracheophytes
- Clade: Angiosperms
- Clade: Eudicots
- Clade: Asterids
- Order: Asterales
- Family: Argophyllaceae (Engl.) Takht.

Genera
- Argophyllum; Corokia

= Argophyllaceae =

Family of flowering plants

Argophyllaceae is a family of shrubs or small trees belonging to the order Asterales. The family includes c. 24 species in two genera, Argophyllum and Corokia. Members of the family are native to eastern Australia, New Zealand, Lord Howe Island, New Caledonia, and Rapa Iti.
