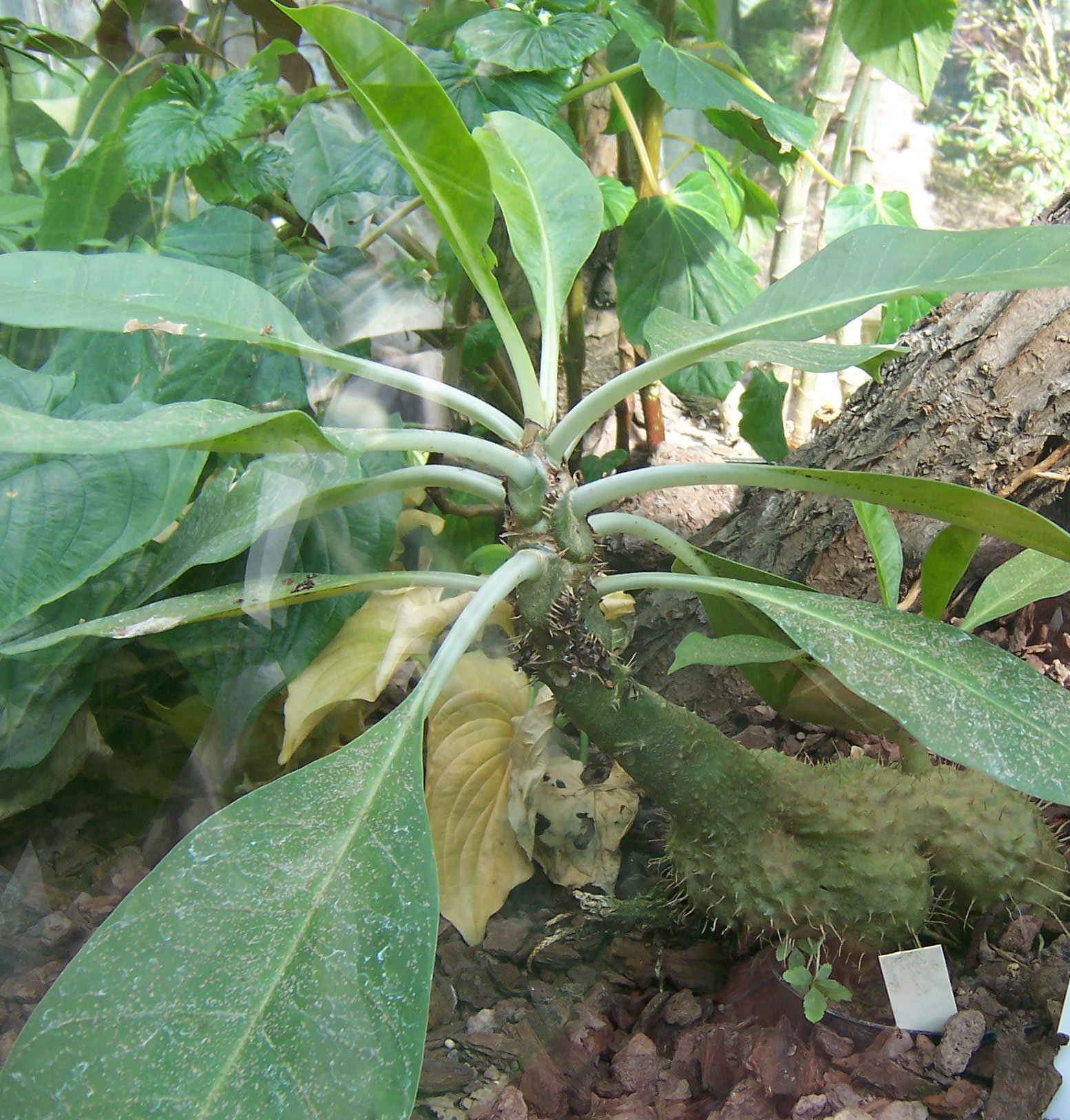
- Myrmecodia platytyrea

Scientific classification
- Kingdom: Plantae
- Clade: Tracheophytes
- Clade: Angiosperms
- Clade: Eudicots
- Clade: Asterids
- Order: Gentianales
- Family: Rubiaceae
- Subfamily: Rubioideae
- Tribe: Psychotrieae
- Genus: Myrmecodia; Jack

Species
- See text

Synonyms
- Bantiala Dauphinot; Epidendroides Sol.

= Myrmecodia =

Genus of epiphytes

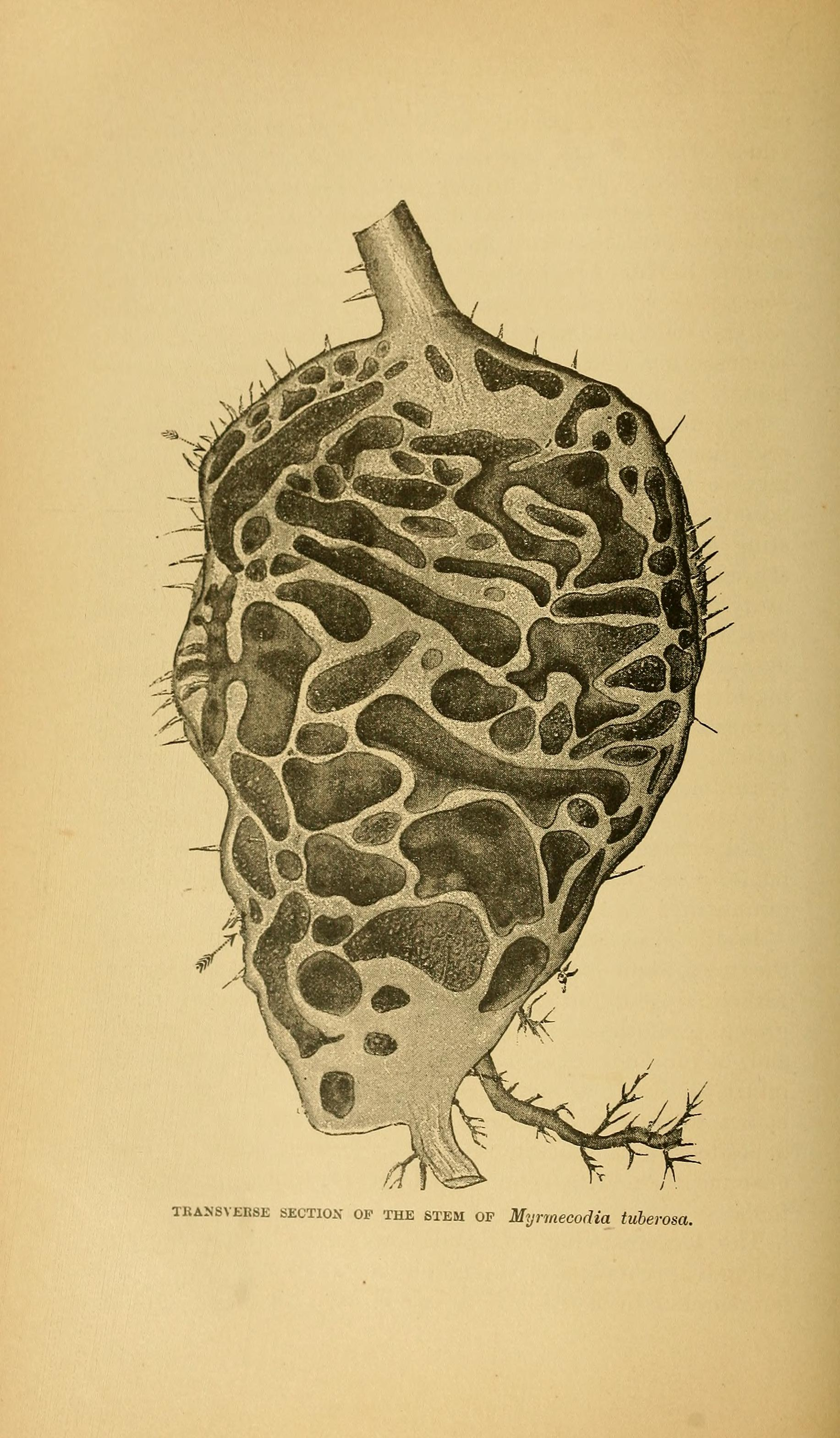
An illustration of the inner chambers of a Myrmecodia plant

Myrmecodia is a genus of epiphytic plants, present in Indochina, Malesia, Papuasia, and Queensland, Australia. It is one of five ant-plant genera in the family Rubiaceae, the others being Anthorrhiza, Hydnophytum, Myrmephytum, and Squamellaria.

Myrmecophytes, or ant plants, live in a mutualistic association with a colony of ants. These plants possess structural adaptations that provide ants with food and/or shelter. Myrmecodia are also classified as epiphytes. The term epiphytic derives from the Greek epi- (meaning 'upon') and phyton (meaning 'plant'). Epiphytic plants are sometimes called "air plants" because they do not root in soil. An epiphyte is a plant that grows harmlessly upon another plant and derives its nutrition and water supply from the air and debris found in its immediate environment. Epiphytes are a non-parasitic type of plant and differ from parasitic organisms in that this type of plant only relies on its host for physical support and does not necessarily have a negative effect on the host plant.

== Structure and evolutionary adaptation ==
Amongst the array of Myrmecodia plants and myrmecolphilious epiphytes, a vast diversity exists with plants that all have similar evolutionary adaptions. Structures such as modified rhizomes, stems, and leaves, which have evolved to naturally produce systems of tunnels and caverns within its various modified organs. In the case of Rubiaceous tuberous antplants such as Myrmecodia plants, which rank highest in number and diversity among the antplants, all have very large, tuberous, modified stems containing many chambers. This adaptation is to house colonies of ants, which live within the readymade chambers naturally grown by the plant.

The tuber begins its growth with the swelling of the seedling hypocotyl. Later, the cavities are formed when cork-generating meristems arise in the inner parenchymatous tissue forming a cork-like wall, cutting off various shaped and sized enclosures. The contents of these then die and dry off, leaving the chambers empty. Future ant inhabitants may clean out remnants of dead tissue but do not primarily excavate—this has been shown by the existence of chambers in plants to which ants never had access. It has been found that ants are not required for Myrmecodia to form the caudex, or tuberous inner chambers—they exist naturally in Myrmecodia with or without a population of ants.

Cavities are found to be randomly but normally distributed within tubers, with no observable pattern or structure. Cavities are connected to the outer surface of the plant by small holes, which are naturally occurring and not created by ants. Hollow, smooth-walled tunnels form within the caudex with external entrance holes, providing an above-ground home for ant colonies. These holes function both as ventilation for both the plant's living tissues as well as the ants, and serve as passageways in and out of the plant.

Myrmecodia species from the family Rubiaceae have the most highly specialized inner chambers, divided into smooth-walled chambers, which are used by ants for nurseries, and rough-walled chambers, used for waste disposal, insect prey remains, and bodies of dead ants from the colony. The caverns with smooth walls have no observable nutrition uptake ability through their walls. Rough-walled chambers, on the other hand, are able to absorb nutrients. In an experiment done with india ink and water, the mixture was placed in both smooth and rough-walled chambers. The mixture was absorbed readily through the protrusions in the rough-walled chamber, but even after sitting on the smooth-walled chamber surface for 20 hours, no absorption was observed. The protrusions that make the walls rough are inward facing modified root structures that make nutritional uptake through the plant's rough-walled chambers possible.

The cavities are also a measure of fitness—a plant with more cavity area means that it has a lighter tuber. This is advantageous because in most cases, although the plants are grown in situ, the tubers become too heavy and fall off of the tree they germinate on, eventually dying on the ground. This suggests that there is a strong selection against heavy or massive tubers.

From the alveoli emerge small white flowers which can self-pollinate to yield a bright orange, fleshy berry filled with up to six small seeds. Seed dispersal is by birds, that often deposit droppings on the branches and trunks of trees they land on. In this they resemble various parasitic plants such as the mistletoes in families such as Loranthaceae, Santalaceae, and Misodendraceae, but Myrmecodia species are unrelated to the true parasites, being in the coffee and gardenia family Rubiaceae.

Myrmecodia plants produce small, juicy fruits from their one or two leaves and flowers per plant. Seeds will be dispersed following the ingestion and passing of the seed as waste product by a bird, or more commonly, ants will remove the seeds from the fruit by chewing on the fruit. If a bird does get to the seed first, the ants will retrieve the seeds from the ground below, return the seeds to the nesting spot, and plant them on their substrate to continue growing their colony with more housing. The seeds are hardy—able to withstand passage through a gut, desiccation for multiple months, and germinate upon wetting.

== Nutrients ==
Myrmecodia plants grow in tree branches and on trunks. In nature, Myrmecodia tubers often grow hanging downward on bare branches without significant amounts of substrate, and thus depend upon symbiosis for most nutriment. The plants store food and water in a greyish brown caudex that swells and grows spines over time. The thick, unbranched stems are covered in clypeoli and alveoli which also grow spines and are densely filled with dry bracts.

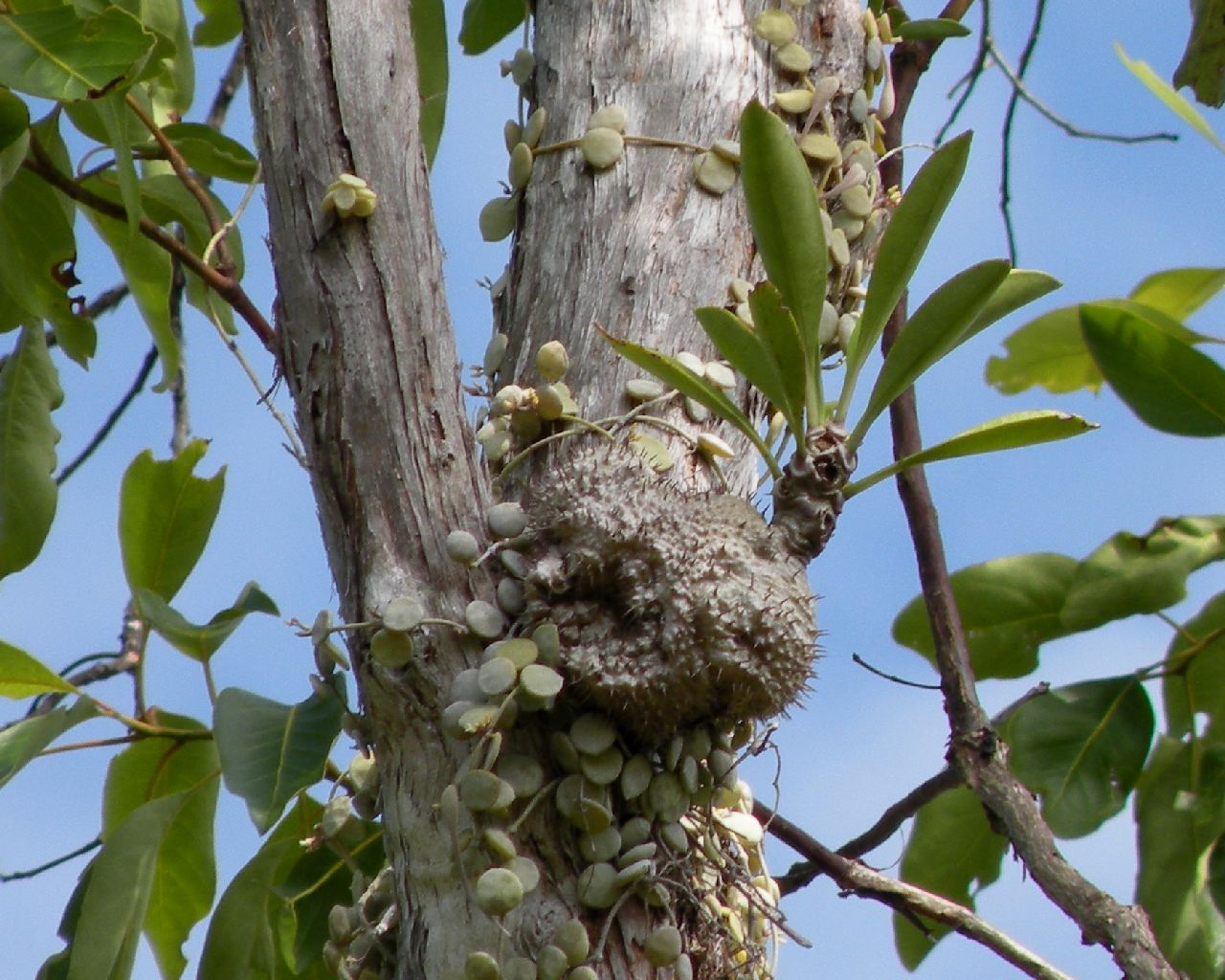
Myrmecodia beccarii growing on Lophostemom suaveolens

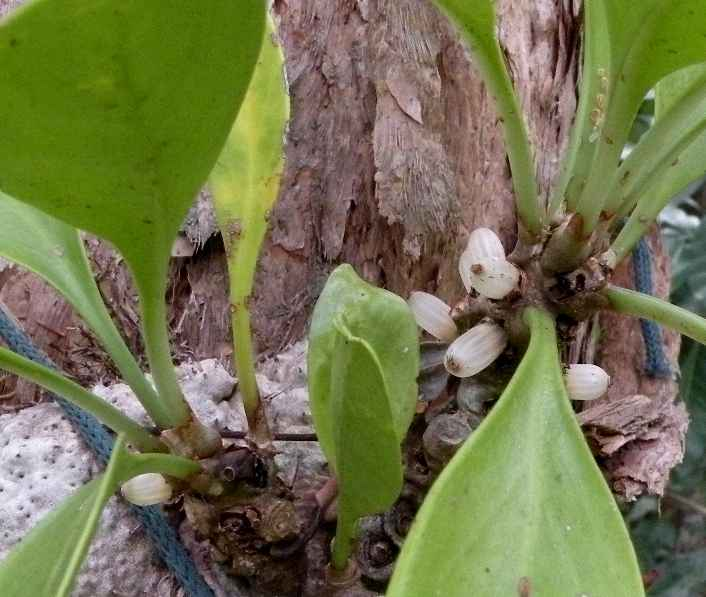
Fruits of Myrmecodia beccarii

Philidris cordata (formally Iridomyrmex cordatus) is believed to be the most common ant found occupying Myrmecodia species. Ant plants provide habitats for ant colonies high up into the forest canopy, protecting them from the elements, and in exchange, the nutrients from the ants and the debris left by the ants be absorbed in the plant's chambers. The plant in addition is protected, to some extent, from predation, especially by grazing invertebrates such as slugs. These plants also have a built in defense against climbing animals; even a slight tap or brush against the outside of an inhabited plant causes ants to come spilling out. Most species of ants that live within Myrmecodia species have no sting however, but the rush of ants combined with many small bites is enough to startle and warn any potential predator. The most important contribution the ants make to the plants they inhabit is not protection, but feeding the plant itself.

The organic material that the ants contribute to the plant falls into three categories; nest building material (material such as leaves, bark, or other plant matter), ant-created products (such as waste, dead enemies, or the bodies of dead ants), and the final category is food that the ants themselves consume. All of these waste products stored within the rough-walled chambers begin to decompose when moisture is present, and are then broken down by microbial activity and the nutrients are then taken up by intrusive adventitious roots or absorbed through wall linings (rough-walls with root "bumps" lining the chambers). When scientists have examined the contents of the debris chambers, it appears as if the insect parts were placed in the chambers for their nutritional purpose to the plant. For example, disproportionately large numbers of ant heads, containing the most nutritionally dense parts of the ant, are found in large numbers within these chambers.

This symbiosis allows the plants to effectively gather nutrients (via the ants) from a much larger area than the roots ever could cover. The ants operate as a mobile feeding system for the plant which act as an "auxiliary extensive, mobile root system for the plants" that bring it concentrated organic matter high in nutrients.

== Species ==
As of August 2024, Plants of the World Online recognises the following 26 species:

- Myrmecodia alata Becc.
- Myrmecodia albertisii Becc.
- Myrmecodia angustifolia Valeton
- Myrmecodia archboldiana Merr. & L.M.Perry
- Myrmecodia aureospina Huxley & Jebb
- Myrmecodia beccarii Hook.f.
- Myrmecodia brassii Merr. & L.M.Perry
- Myrmecodia erinacea Becc.
- Myrmecodia ferox Huxley & Jebb
- Myrmecodia gracilispina Huxley & Jebb
- Myrmecodia horrida Huxley & Jebb
- Myrmecodia jobiensis Becc.
- Myrmecodia kutubuensis Huxley & Jebb
- Myrmecodia lamii Merr. & L.M.Perry
- Myrmecodia longifolia Valeton
- Myrmecodia longissima Valeton
- Myrmecodia melanacantha Huxley & Jebb
- Myrmecodia oblongata Valeton
- Myrmecodia oksapminensis Huxley & Jebb
- Myrmecodia paradoxa Huxley & Jebb
- Myrmecodia pendens Merr. & L.M.Perry
- Myrmecodia platytyrea Becc.
- Myrmecodia pteroaspida Huxley & Jebb
- Myrmecodia schlechteri Valeton
- Myrmecodia sterrophylla Merr. & L.M.Perry
- Myrmecodia tuberosa Jack
