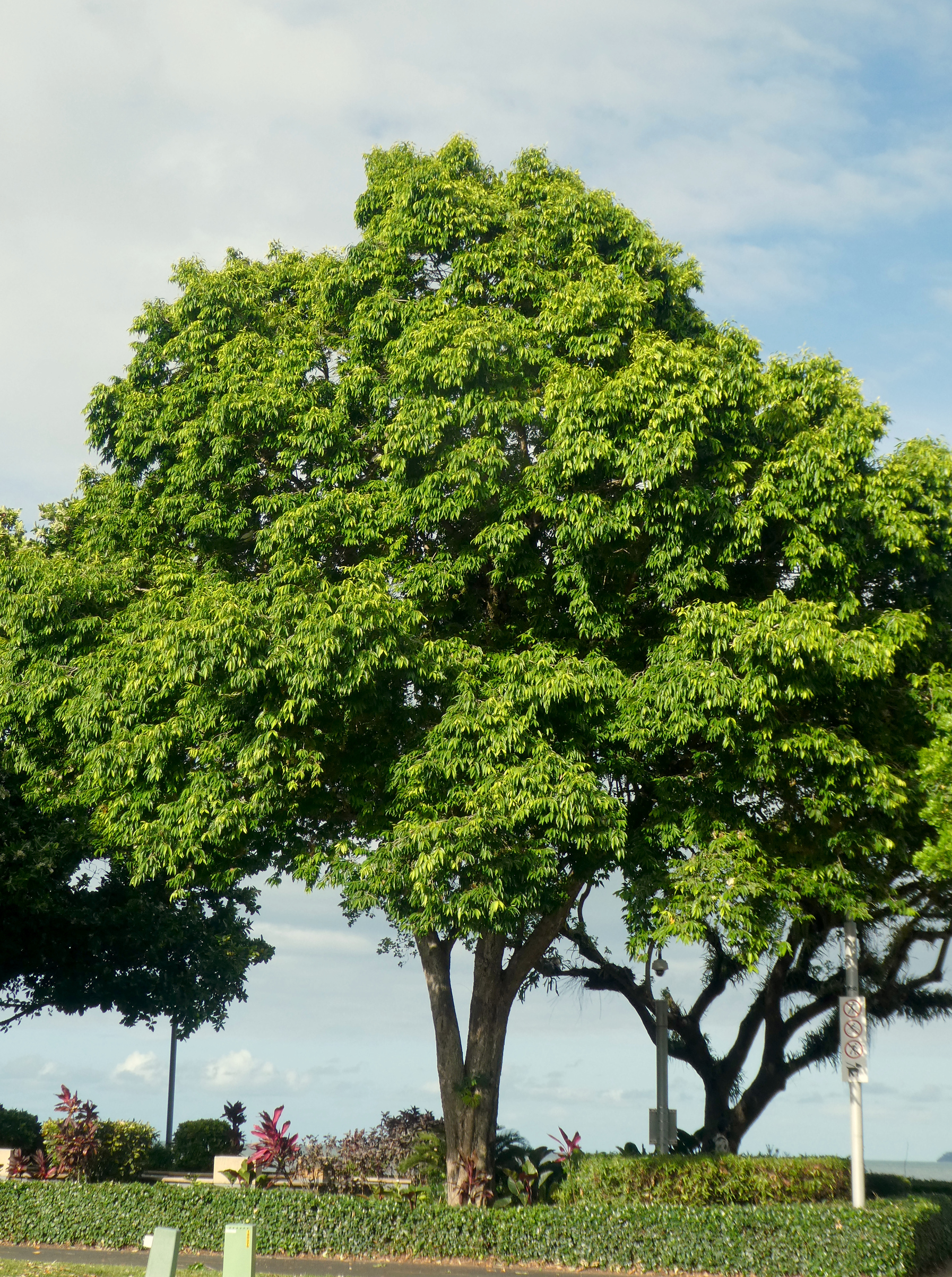
- Growing on the Cairns Esplanade, November 2022

Conservation status
- Least Concern (IUCN 3.1)
- Least Concern (NCA)

Scientific classification
- Kingdom: Plantae
- Clade: Tracheophytes
- Clade: Angiosperms
- Clade: Eudicots
- Clade: Rosids
- Order: Myrtales
- Family: Myrtaceae
- Genus: Syzygium
- Species: S. tierneyanum

Binomial name
- Syzygium tierneyanum (F.Muell.) T.G.Hartley & L.M.Perry
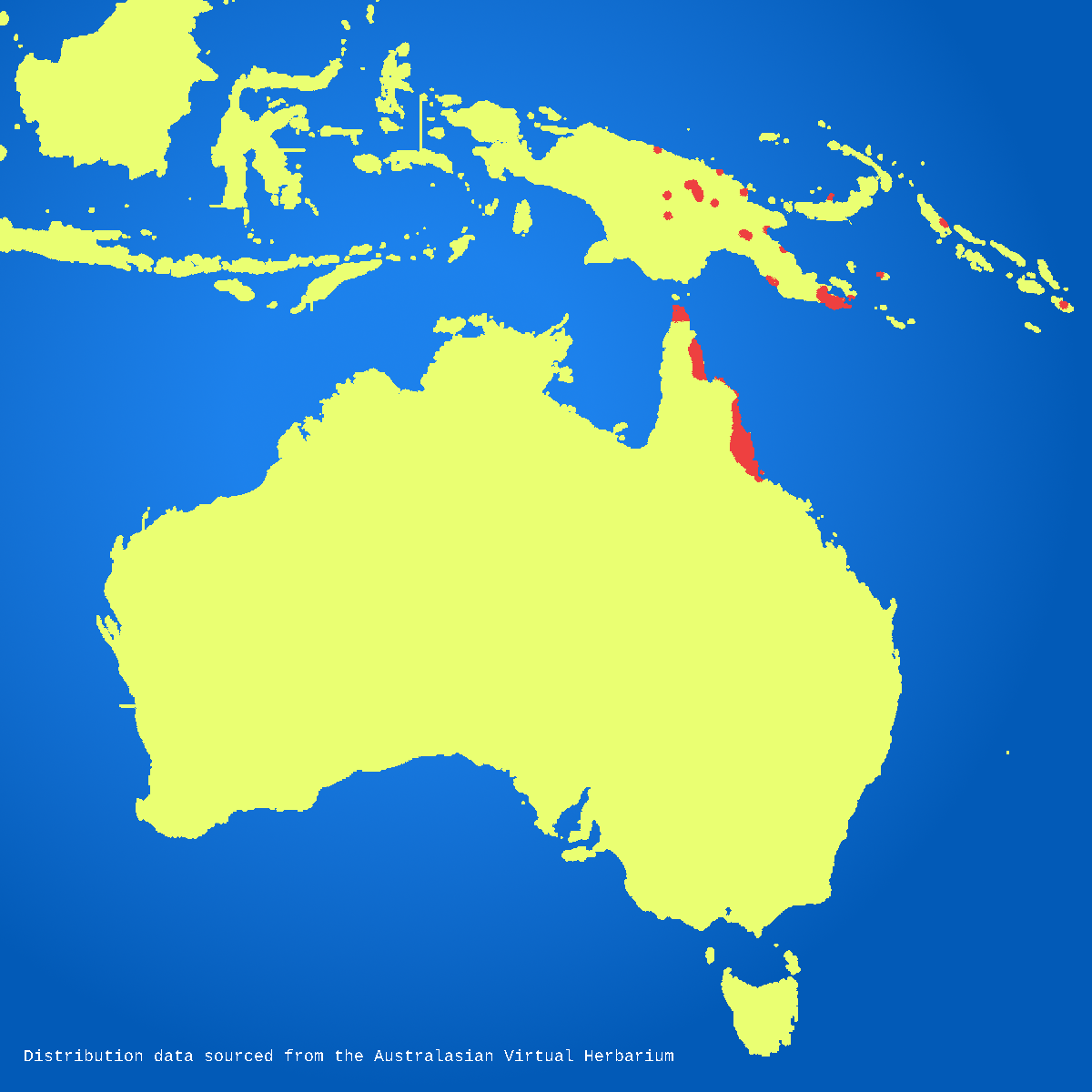

Synonyms
- 7 synonyms: Eugenia tierneyana F.Muell.; Jambosa tierneyana (F.Muell.) Diels; Eugenia theodori-wolfii Domin; Jambosa floribunda Diels; Syzygium floribundum K.Schum. & Lauterb.; Syzygium lauterbachianum Merr. & L.M.Perry; Syzygium lauterbachianum var. phaeophloium Merr. & L.M.Perry

= Syzygium tierneyanum =

River cherry

Species of flowering plant

Syzygium tierneyanum, commonly known as river cherry, water cherry, or Bamaga satinash, is a tree in the family Myrtaceae which is native to New Guinea, the Solomon Islands, Vanuatu and north east Queensland. It often grows along watercourses where it is a facultative rheophyte.

== Description ==
Syzygium tierneyanum is a medium sized spreading tree up to about 20 m (66 ft) in height with grey bark and an open crown. The leaves are arranged in opposite pairs on the twigs and can reach up to 14 cm (5.5 in) long, with well-spaced lateral veins. Numerous small white flowers are produced in the summer and are followed by cream, pink or red edible berries about 3 cm (1.2 in) diameter.

== Taxonomy ==
The river cherry was first described as Eugenia tierneyana in 1865 by Ferdinand von Mueller. It was reviewed and given its current binomial name in 1973 by Thomas Gordon Hartley and Lily May Perry.

== Conservation ==
This species is listed by the Queensland Department of Environment and Science as least concern. As of 13 November 2022, it has not been assessed by the IUCN.

== Cultivation ==
This species has been widely planted as a park and street tree in the city of Cairns, Queensland.

== Gallery ==
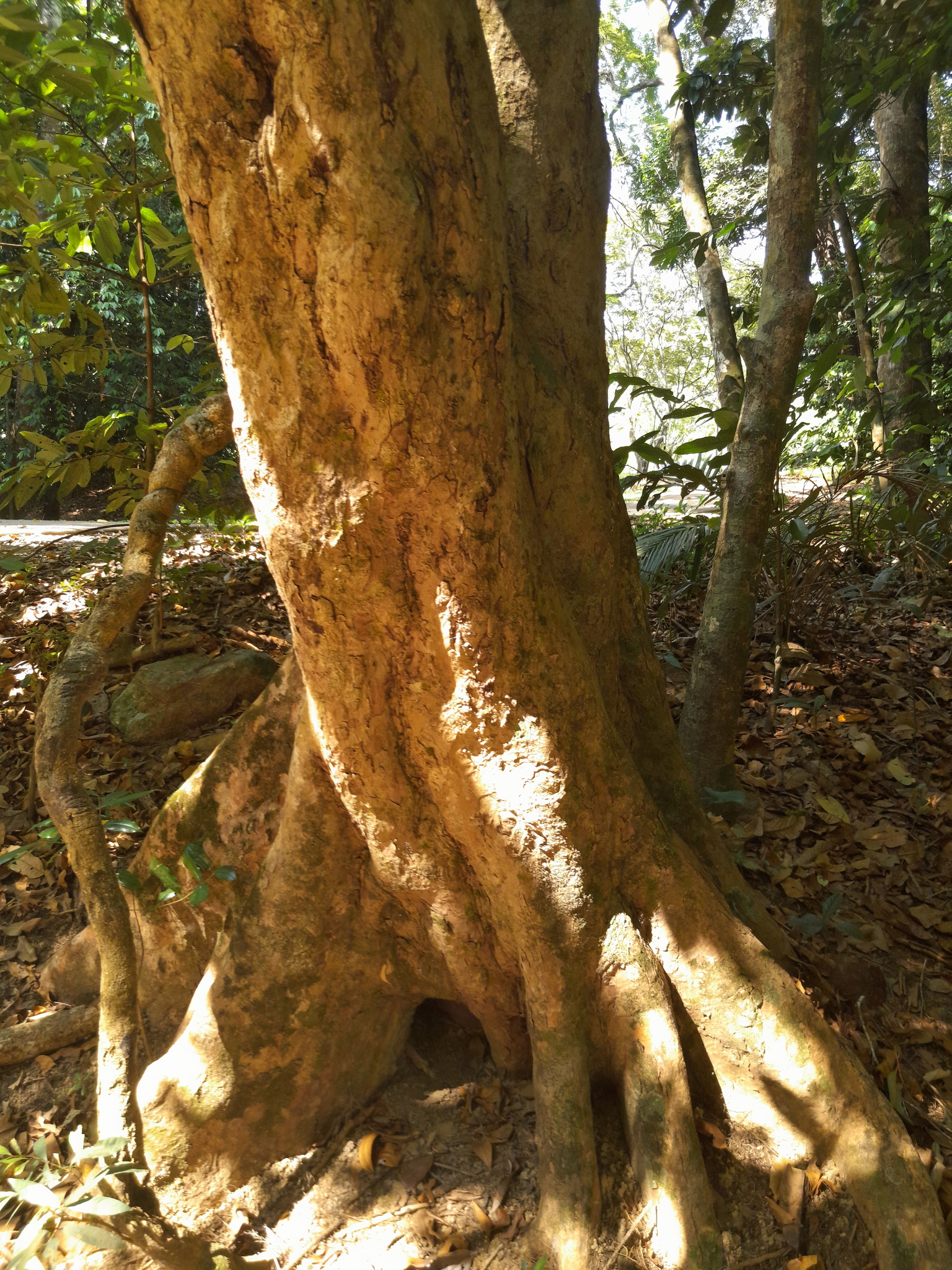
Trunk

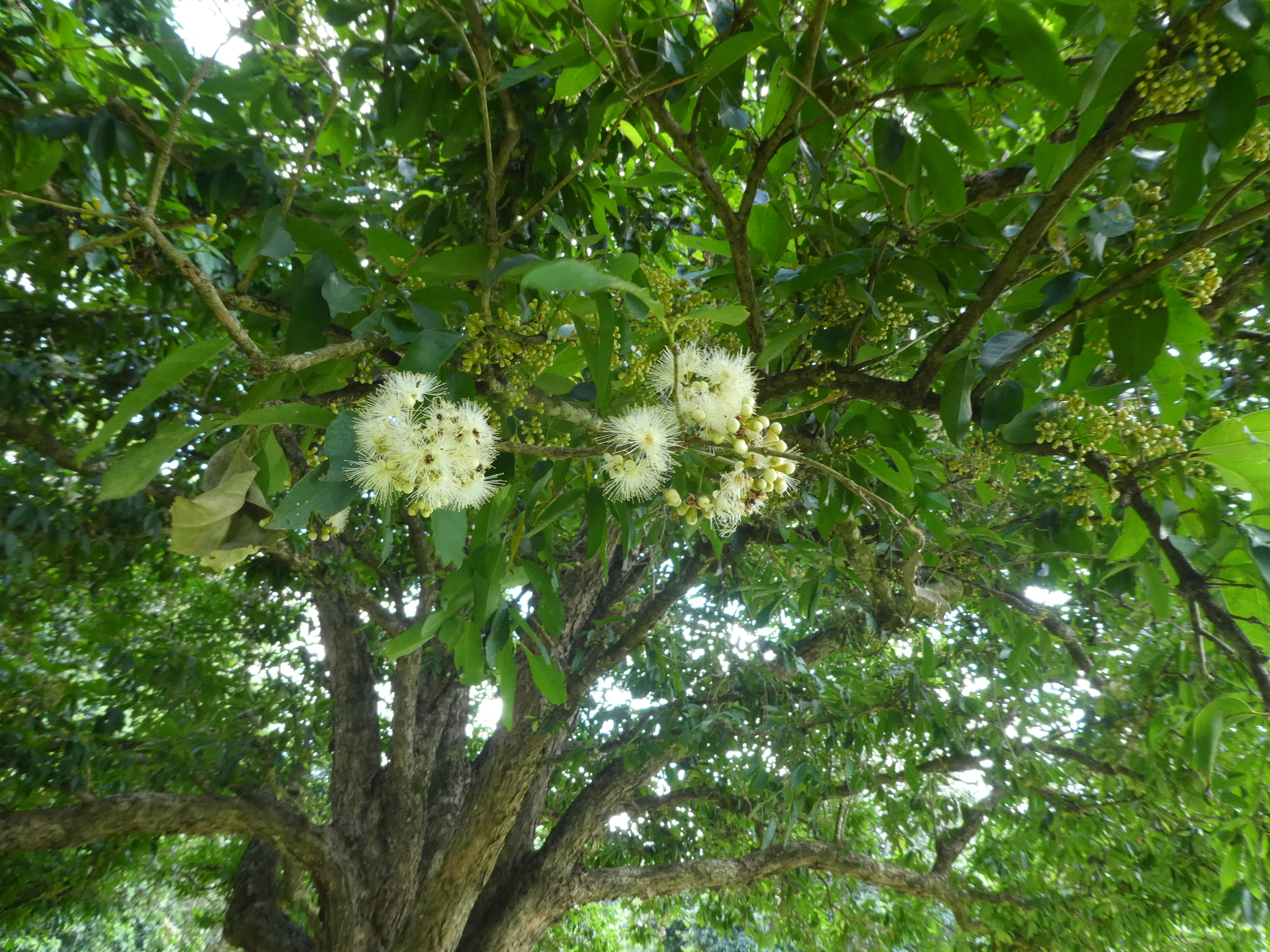
Flowers

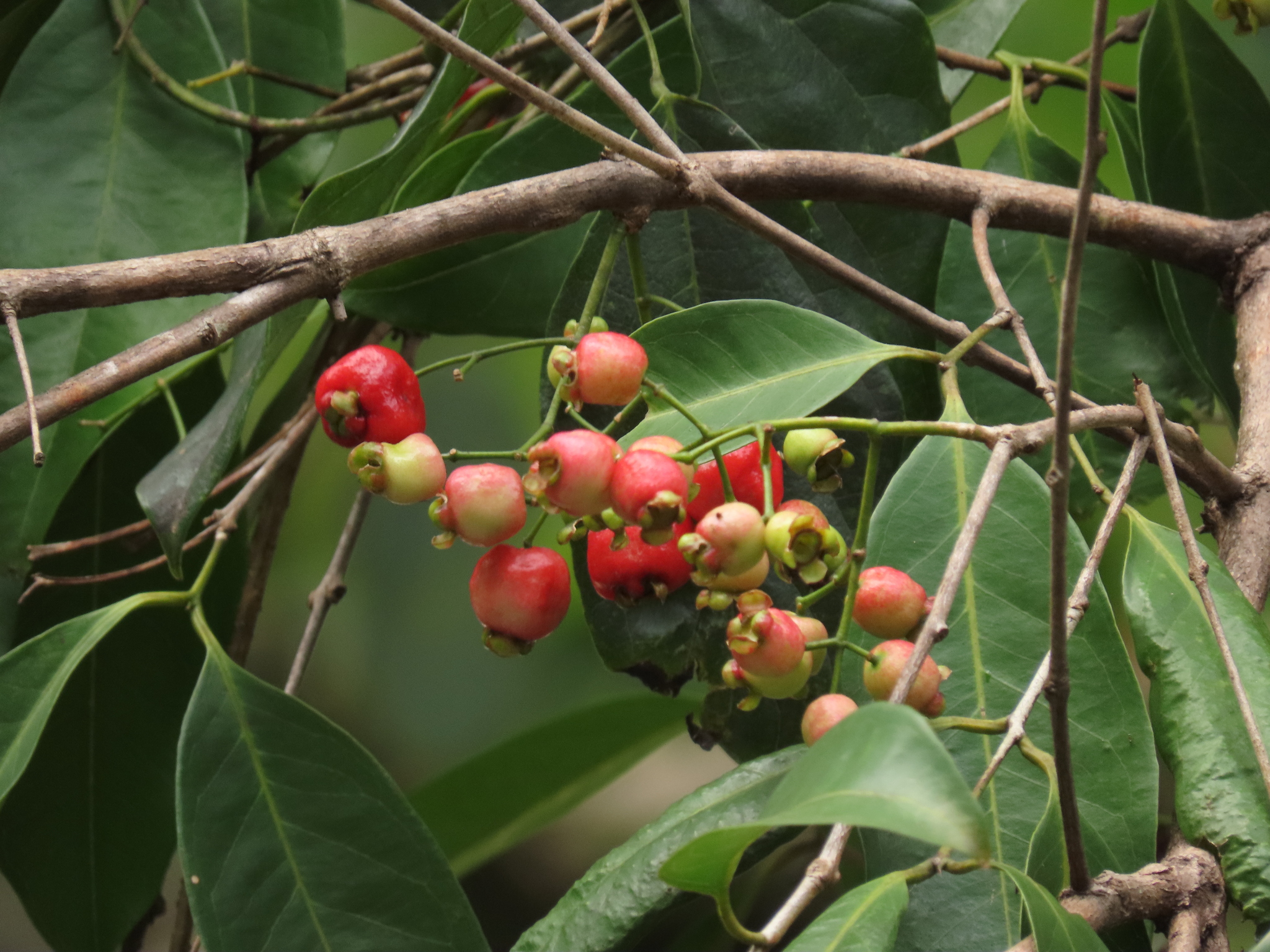
Fruit

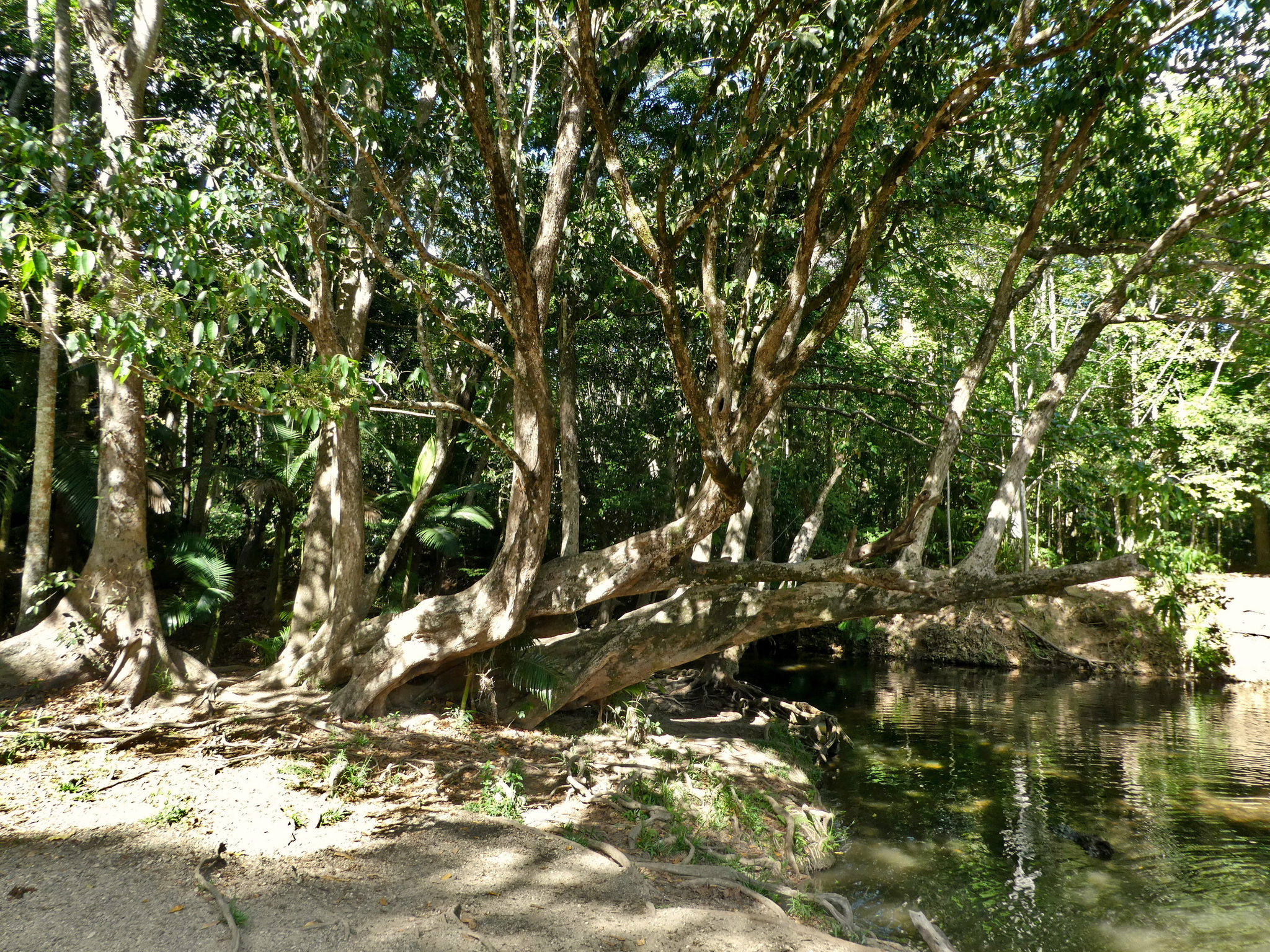
Tree beside Freshwater Creek in Cairns
