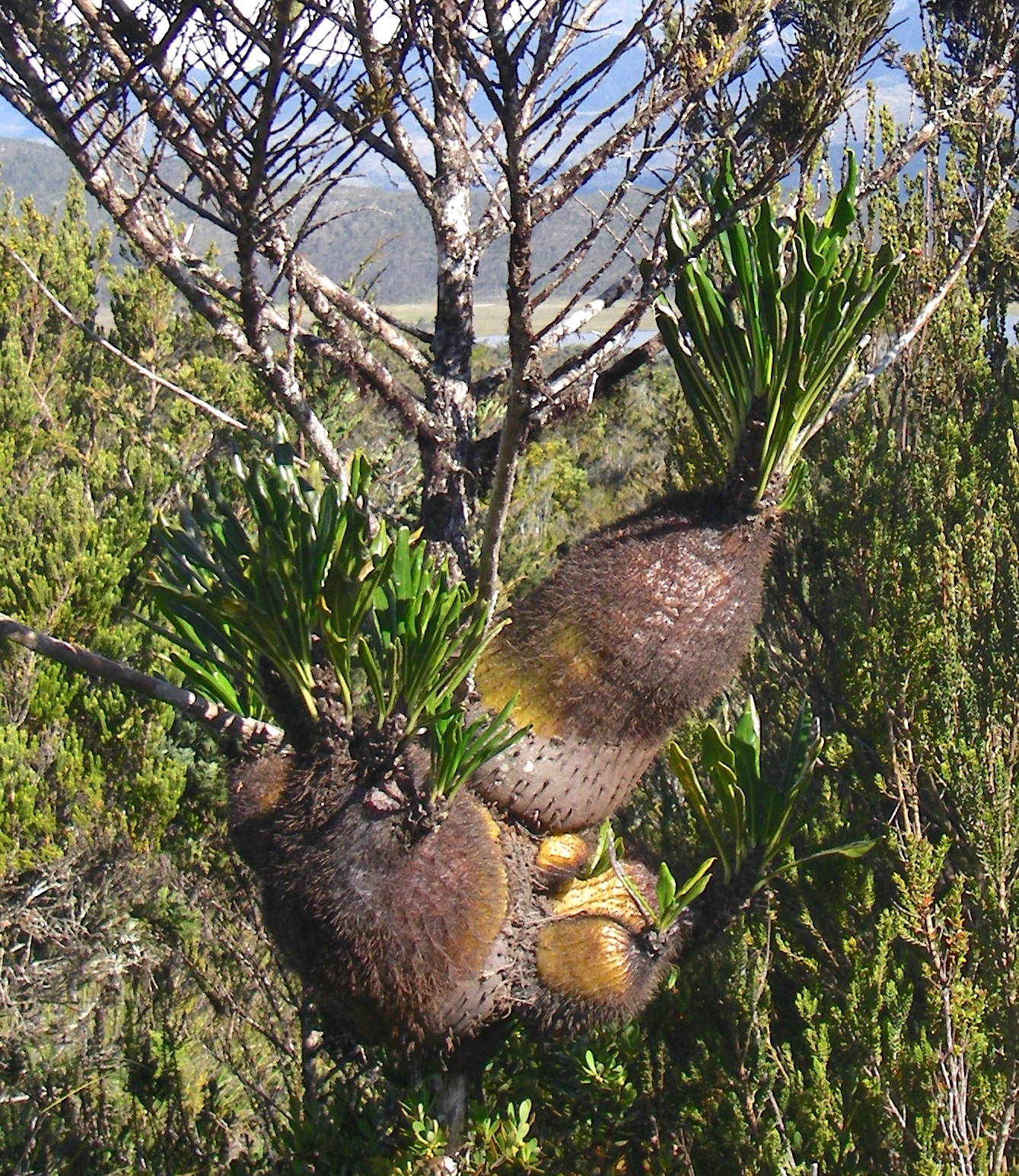

Scientific classification
- Kingdom: Plantae
- Clade: Tracheophytes
- Clade: Angiosperms
- Clade: Eudicots
- Clade: Asterids
- Order: Gentianales
- Family: Rubiaceae
- Genus: Myrmecodia
- Species: M. lamii

Binomial name
- Myrmecodia lamii Merr. & L.M.Perry

= Myrmecodia lamii =

Species of plant

Myrmecodia lamii is a myrmecophilous (ant-loving) epiphytic, or sometimes terrestrial plant in the gardenia family Rubiaceae native to New Guinea. It has a greatly swollen hypocotyl region containing numerous tunnels and chambers utilized by certain species of ants as a colony. This hypocotyl can measure up to 70 cm (28 in) height by up to 45 cm (18 in) wide, by far the largest known hypocotyl. The total height of the plant, including the black and white ringed branches, comes to 120 cm (47 in). The flowers are white or pale blue.The species was described in 1945 by Merrill and Perry. The type specimen was collected by Australian-American botanist Leonard John Brass at Lake Habbema on his 1938-39 expedition to New Guinea. The species was named after Herman Johannes Lam.
