= Styphelia lavarackii =

Scientific classification
- Kingdom: Plantae
- Clade: Tracheophytes
- Clade: Angiosperms
- Clade: Eudicots
- Clade: Asterids
- Order: Ericales
- Family: Ericaceae
- Genus: Styphelia
- Species: S. lavarackii

Binomial name
- Styphelia lavarackii (Pedley) Hislop, Crayn & Puente-Lel.
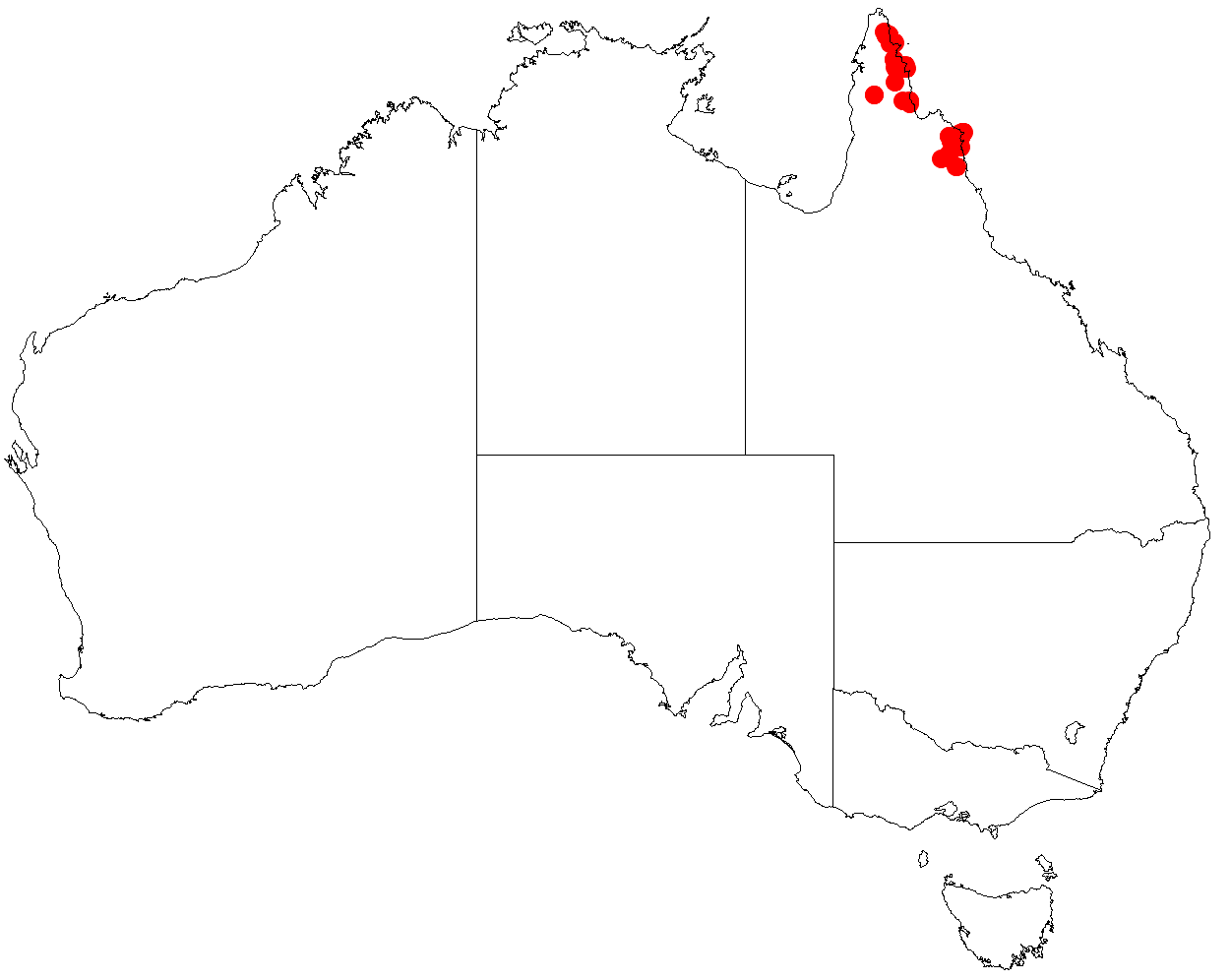
- Occurrence data from AVH

Synonyms
- Leucopogon lavarackii Pedley

Species of shrub

Styphelia lavarackii is a species of flowering plant in the heath family Ericaceae and is endemic to far north Queensland. It is a shrub with many softly hairy branchlets, oblong or elliptic leaves, and white flowers.

== Description ==
Styphelia lavarackii is a shrub with many softly-hairy branchlets, that typically grows to a height of up to 3 m (9.8 ft). Its leaves are oblong, elliptic or lance-shaped with the narrower end towards the base, 11–15 mm (0.43–0.59 in) long and 2–3 mm (0.079–0.118 in) wide with the edges slightly rolled under. The upper surface of the leaves is shiny and the veins are obvious on the lower surface. The flowers are arranged in groups of 2 to 4 in upper leaf axils with bracts about 0.7 mm (0.028 in) long and bracteoles 1.2–1.7 mm (0.047–0.067 in) long. The sepals are 3–4 mm (0.12–0.16 in) long and shorter than the petals, and the petals are white, 5–6 mm (0.20–0.24 in) long and form a tube 2–3 mm (0.079–0.118 in) long. The fruit is an orange-yellow drupe.

== Taxonomy ==
This species was first formally described in 1990 by Leslie Pedley who gave it the name Leucopogon lavarackii in the journal Austrobaileya from specimens collected by Leonard John Brass on Mount Tozer in 1948. In 2020, Michael Hislop, Darren Crayn and Caroline Puente-Lelievre transferred the species to Styphelia as S. lavaracki in Australian Systematic Botany. The specific epithet (lavaracki) honours Peter S. Lavarack.

== Distribution and habitat ==
This styphelia grows on sandy soil on the eastern side of Cape York Peninsula and near Cooktown and Coen.
