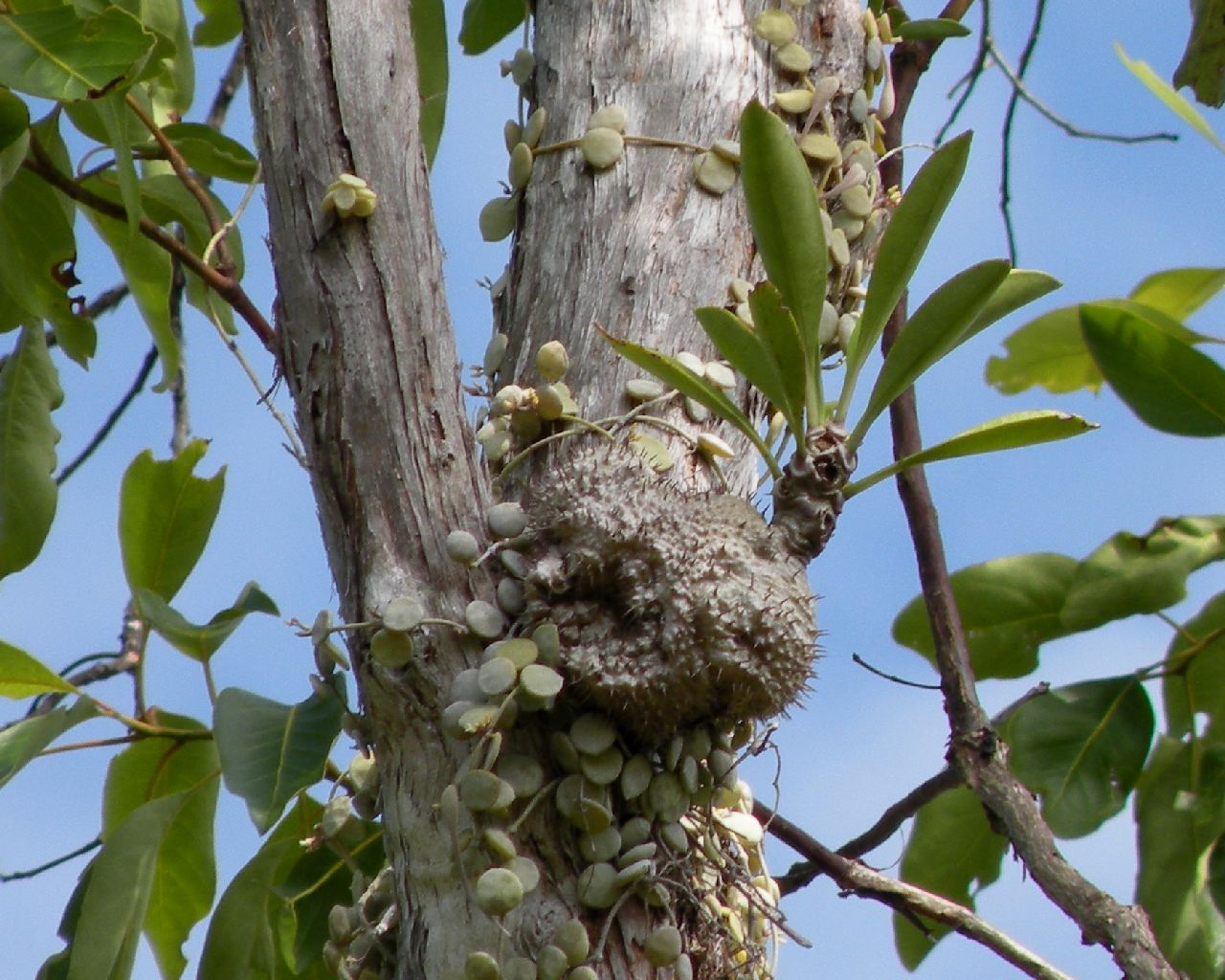
- Myrmecodia beccarii with Dischidia nummularia

Conservation status
- Vulnerable (EPBC Act)
- Vulnerable (NCA)

Scientific classification
- Kingdom: Plantae
- Clade: Tracheophytes
- Clade: Angiosperms
- Clade: Eudicots
- Clade: Asterids
- Order: Gentianales
- Family: Rubiaceae
- Genus: Myrmecodia
- Species: M. beccarii

Binomial name
- Myrmecodia beccarii Hook.f.

Synonyms
- Epidendroides tetrandra Sol.

= Myrmecodia beccarii =

Species of epiphyte

Myrmecodia beccarii is a species plant in the coffee and gardenia family Rubiaceae. It is an epiphyte which grows in Melaleuca trees in the wetlands and mangrove forests of tropical north Queensland, Australia. It is commonly known as ant plant or ant-house plant, as hollows in its tuber are colonised by ants. The species was first described in 1886, and has a conservation status of vulnerable.

== Description ==
The prickly, swollen caudex develops natural hollows which are colonised by the golden ant (Philidris cordata) in a symbiotic arrangement. The ants patrol the plant, removing leaf-eaters, while their excreta is absorbed by the plant for nutrition.

The flowers are white and tubular, to 10 mm, and the fruit is white/translucent containing a single seed. These seeds are transported to other trees by the mistletoebird (Dicaeum hirundinaceum).

== Distribution ==
Myrmecodia beccarii occurs in coastal mangrove forests and paperbark wetlands from the northernmost part of Cape York Peninsula to near Paluma.

== Taxonomy ==
The species was described in 1886 by English botanist Joseph Dalton Hooker, based on a plant collected in the Gulf of Carpentaria and sent to England. Hooker named the new species in honour of Italian botanist Odoardo Beccari.

== Conservation status ==
This species is listed as vulnerable in both the national Species Profile and Threats database and the Queensland Government's WildNet database. As of November 2026, it has not been assessed by the International Union for Conservation of Nature.

== Ecology ==
The Apollo jewel butterfly (Hypochrysops apollo) lays its eggs on the plant, and because they smell like ant's eggs, the ants carry the eggs inside the plant, where they develop to the butterfly stage. Hypochrysops is a genus of "blues", butterflies in the family Lycaenidae, which is notorious for its myrmecophily. Accordingly, it is likely that the larvae that hatch from the eggs feed either on food begged from the ants, or on ant larvae, or possibly both. In either event, the butterfly finally emerges and flies off. This plant has been declared by Australia as a vulnerable species due to invasive species and illegal collecting.

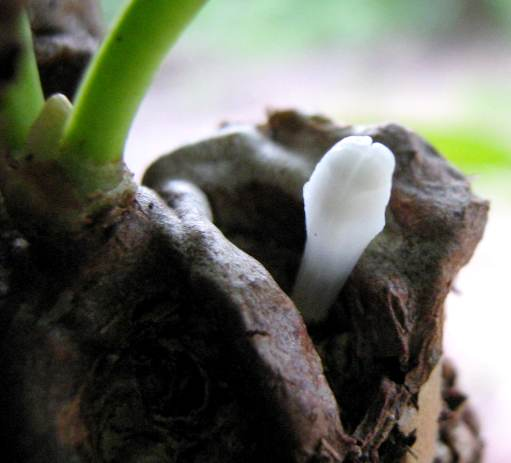
flower

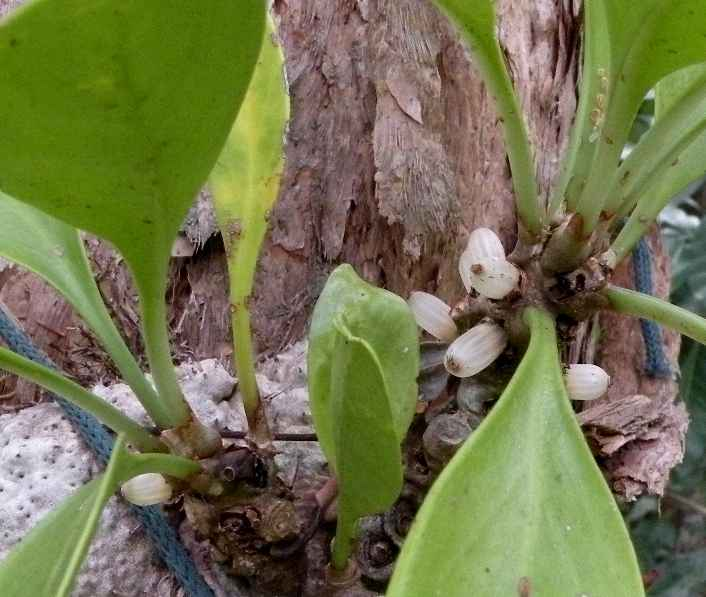
fruiting
