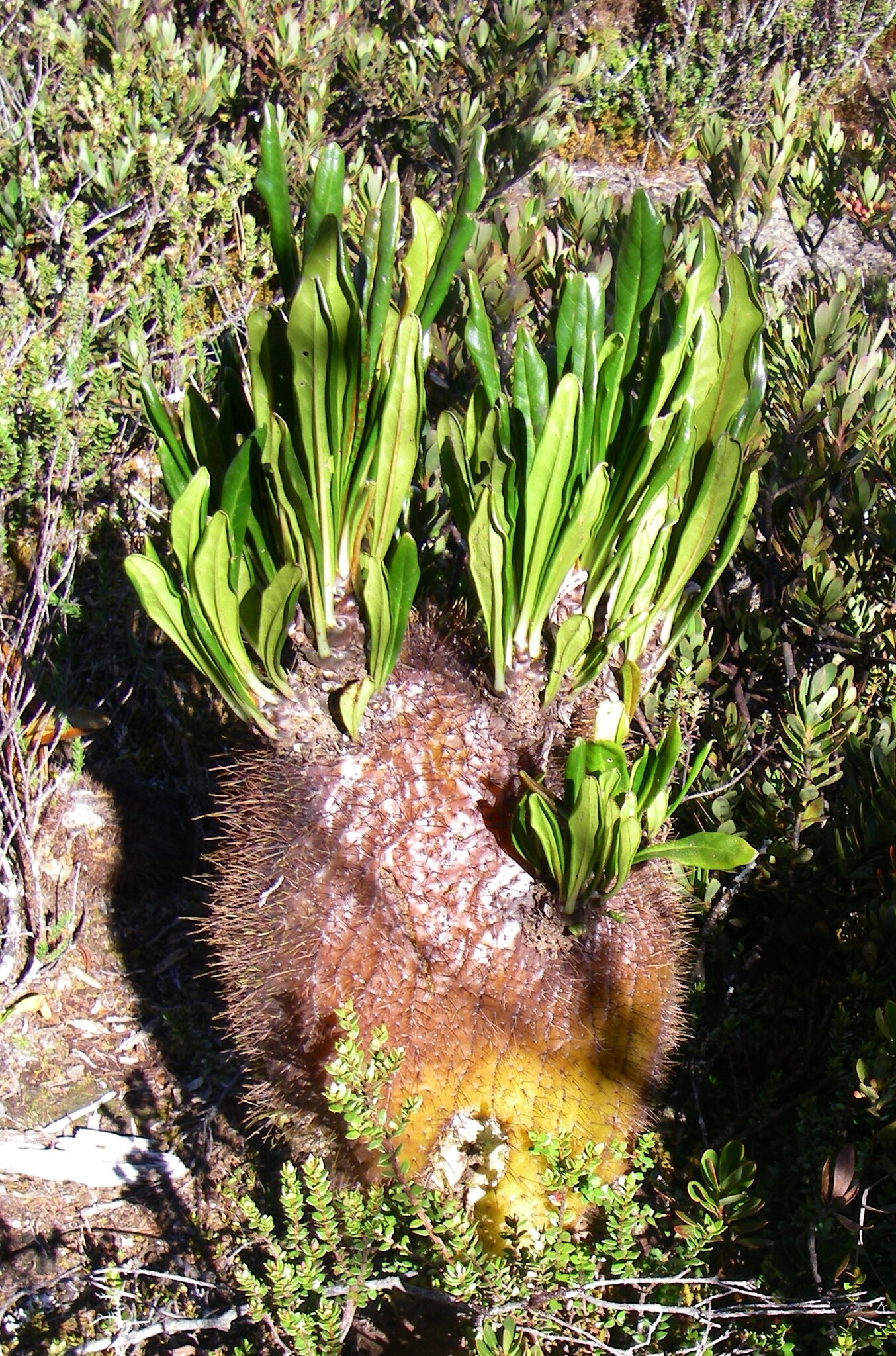

Scientific classification
- Kingdom: Plantae
- Clade: Tracheophytes
- Clade: Angiosperms
- Clade: Eudicots
- Clade: Asterids
- Order: Gentianales
- Family: Rubiaceae
- Genus: Myrmecodia
- Species: M. brassii

Binomial name
- Myrmecodia brassii Merr. & L.M.Perry

= Myrmecodia brassii =

Species of plant

Myrmecodia brassii is a myrmecophilous (ant-loving) epiphytic, or sometimes terrestrial plant in the gardenia family Rubiaceae native to New Guinea. The species was described in 1945 by Merrill and Perry. The type specimen was collected by Australian-American botanist Leonard John Brass at Lake Habbema on his 1938–39 expedition to New Guinea. The species is named after Brass.
