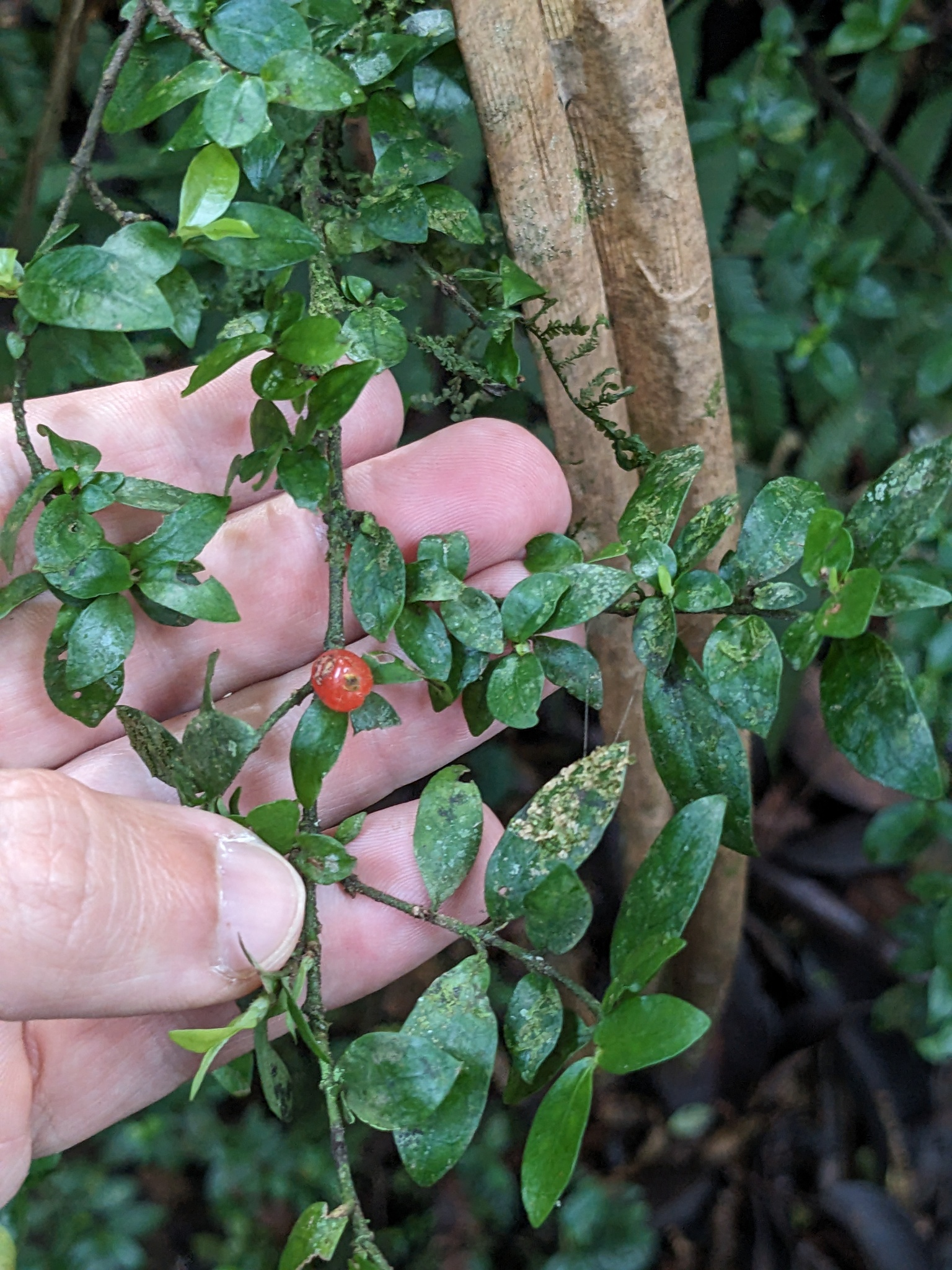
- Amaracarpus pubescens

Scientific classification
- Kingdom: Plantae
- Clade: Embryophytes
- Clade: Tracheophytes
- Clade: Spermatophytes
- Clade: Angiosperms
- Clade: Eudicots
- Clade: Asterids
- Order: Gentianales
- Family: Rubiaceae
- Subfamily: Rubioideae
- Tribe: Psychotrieae
- Genus: Amaracarpus; Blume

Type species
- Amaracarpus pubescens Blume

Synonyms
- Melachone Gilli; Neoschimpera Hemsl.

= Amaracarpus =

Genus of plants

Amaracarpus is a genus of shrubs, treelets or trees in the family Rubiaceae. It was described by Carl Ludwig Blume in 1826. Most of the species are endemic to New Guinea but a few have wider ranges in Southeast Asia from Myanmar (Burma) and the Andaman Islands across Thailand, Malaysia, Indonesia, the Philippines, Melanesia, Christmas Island, Queensland and Vanuatu. One species also occurs in the Seychelles. Several species were published years ago but are today not represented by any type specimens or other known existing material.

== Species ==
- Amaracarpus acuminatus S.Moore - New Guinea
- Amaracarpus anomalus Wernham - New Guinea
- Amaracarpus attenuatus Merr. & L.M.Perry - New Guinea
- Amaracarpus belensis Merr. & L.M.Perry - Seram, New Guinea
- Amaracarpus brassii Merr. & L.M.Perry - New Guinea
- Amaracarpus braunianus (Warb. ex Boerl.) Valeton - New Guinea
- Amaracarpus calcicola Merr. & L.M.Perry - New Guinea
- Amaracarpus compactus Merr. & L.M.Perry - New Guinea
- Amaracarpus cuneifolius Valeton - New Guinea
- Amaracarpus doormanniensis Valeton - New Guinea
- Amaracarpus floribundus Valeton - New Guinea
- Amaracarpus grandiflorus A.P.Davis - Maluku
- Amaracarpus grandifolius Valeton - Maluku, New Guinea, Solomons, Bismarcks
- Amaracarpus idenburgensis Merr. & L.M.Perry - New Guinea
- Amaracarpus kochii Valeton - New Guinea
- Amaracarpus ledermannii Valeton - New Guinea
- Amaracarpus major (Valeton) A.P.Davis - New Guinea
- Amaracarpus montanus Valeton - New Guinea
- Amaracarpus nematopodus (F.Muell) P.I.Forst. - New Guinea, Queensland, Vanuatu
- Amaracarpus nouhuizii (Valeton) Valeton - New Guinea
- Amaracarpus novoguineensis (Warb. ex Boerl.) Valeton - New Guinea
- Amaracarpus nymanii Valeton - Papua New Guinea
- Amaracarpus papuanus Valeton - New Guinea
- Amaracarpus pubescens Blume - Seychelles, Andaman & Nicobar Islands, Myanmar, Thailand, Malaysia, Indonesia (Borneo, Sumatra, Java, Maluku, Lesser Sunda Islands, Sulawesi), Philippines, Christmas Island, Irian Jaya
- Amaracarpus rhombifolius Valeton - New Guinea
- Amaracarpus schlechteri Valeton - New Guinea
- Amaracarpus syzygifolius Valeton - New Guinea
- Amaracarpus trichocalyx Valeton - New Guinea
- Amaracarpus wichmannii Valeton - New Guinea
- Amaracarpus xanthocarpus Merr. & L.M.Perry - New Guinea
