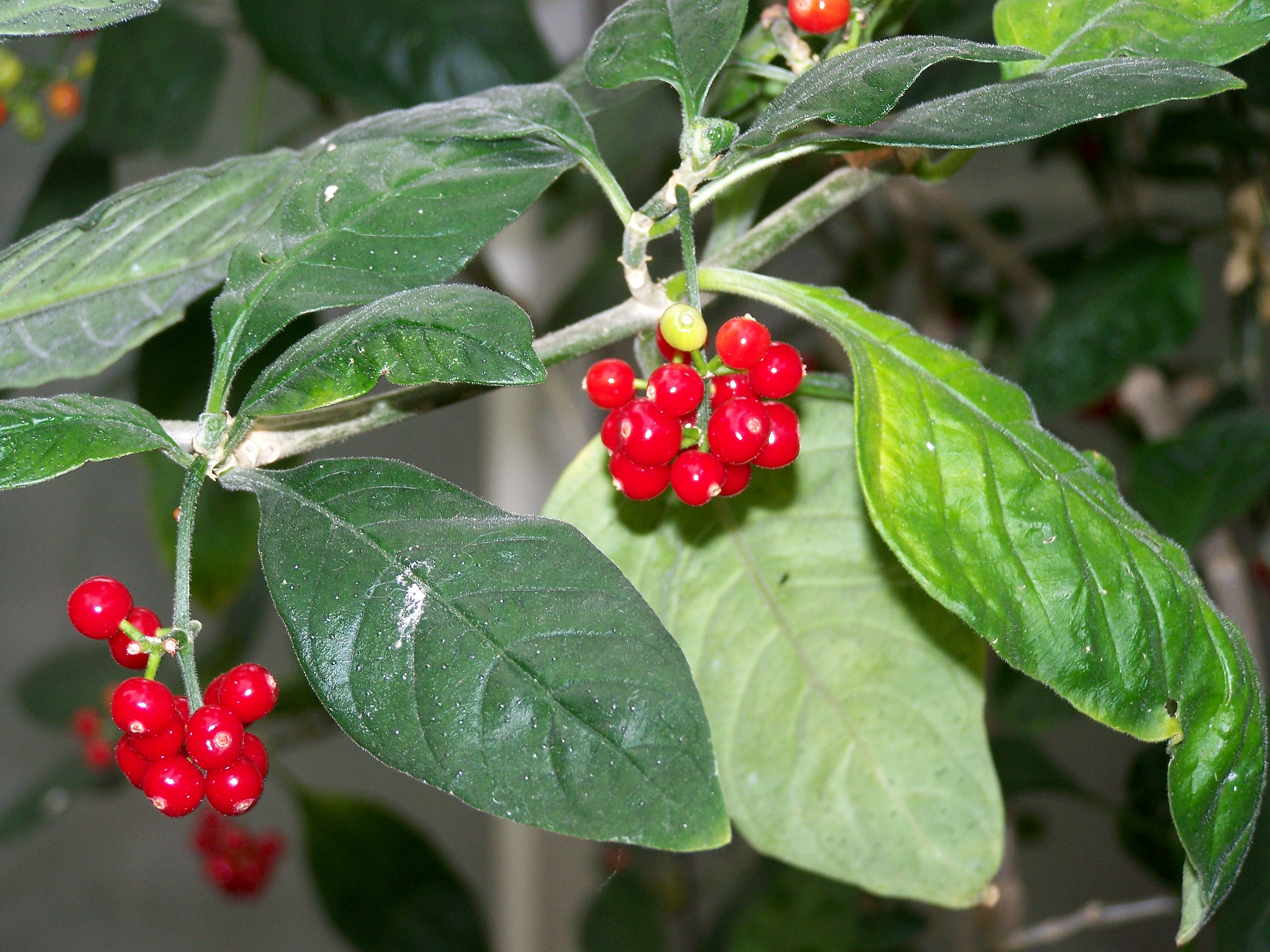
- Psychotria punctata

Scientific classification
- Kingdom: Plantae
- Clade: Tracheophytes
- Clade: Angiosperms
- Clade: Eudicots
- Clade: Asterids
- Order: Gentianales
- Family: Rubiaceae
- Subfamily: Rubioideae
- Tribe: Psychotrieae; Cham. & Schltdl.

Type genus
- Psychotria L.

= Psychotrieae =

Tribe of plants

Psychotrieae is a tribe of flowering plants in the family Rubiaceae and contains about 2114 species in 17 genera. Its representatives are found in the tropics and subtropics. Several genera are Myrmecophytes (ant plants)

== Genera ==
Currently accepted names

- Amaracarpus Blume (30 sp.) - Seychelles, from Andaman Islands to northern Vanuatu
- Anthorrhiza C.R.Huxley & Jebb (9 sp.) - Papua New Guinea
- Apomuria Bremek. (12 sp.) - Madagascar
- Calycosia A.Gray (8 sp.) - New Guinea, Solomon Islands, Fiji, Samoa, Society Islands
- Cremocarpon Boivin ex Baill. (9 sp.) - Comoros, Madagascar
- Dolianthus C.H.Wright (13 sp.) - New Guinea
- Gillespiea A.C.Sm. (1 sp.) - Fiji
- Hydnophytum Jack (94 sp.) - Indo-China to southwestern Pacific region
- Myrmecodia Jack (27 sp.) - from Vietnam to northern Australia
- Myrmephytum Becc. (5 sp.) - Philippines, Sulawesi, New Guinea
- Psychotria L. (1874 sp.) - tropics and subtropics
- Ronabea Aubl. (3 sp.) - Tropical America
- Squamellaria Becc. (4 sp.) - Fiji
- Streblosa Korth. (25 sp.) - from Thailand to Malesia

Synonyms

- Antherura Lour. = Psychotria
- Aucubiphyllum Ahlb. = Psychotria
- Baldingera Dennst. = Psychotria
- Callicocca Schreb. = Psychotria
- Calycodendron A.C.Sm. = Psychotria
- Camptopus Hook.f. = Psychotria
- Cephaelis Sw. = Psychotria
- Chesnea Scop. = Psychotria
- Chicoinaea Comm. exDC. = Psathura
- Coddingtonia S.Bowdich = Psychotria
- Codonocalyx Miers ex Lindl. = Psychotria
- Delpechia Montrouz. = Psychotria
- Douarrea Montrouz. = Psychotria
- Dychotria Raf. = Psychotria
- Epidendroides Sol. = Myrmecodia
- Eumorphanthus A.C.Sm. = Psychotria
- Eurhotia Neck. = Psychotria
- Furcatella Baum.-Bod. = Psychotria
- Galvania Vand. = Psychotria
- Gamotopea Bremek. = Psychotria
- Grumilea Gaertn. = Psychotria
- Hylacium P.Beauv. = Psychotria
- Lasiostoma Benth. = Hydnophytum
- Macrocalyx Miers ex Lindl. = Psychotria
- Mapouria Aubl. = Psychotria
- Megalopus K.Schum. = Psychotria
- Melachone Gilli = Amaracarpus
- Myrmedoma Becc. = Myrmephytum
- Myrstiphylla Raf. = Psychotria
- Myrstiphyllum P.Browne = Psychotria
- Naletonia Bremek. = Psychotria
- Neoschimpera Hemsl. = Amaracarpus
- Petagomoa Bremek. = Psychotria
- Pleureia Raf. = Psychotria
- Polyozus Lour. = Psychotria
- Psathura Comm. ex A.Juss. = Pyschotria
- Psychotrion St.-Lag. = Psychotria
- Psychotrophum P.Browne = Psychotria
- Pyragra Bremek. = Psychotria
- Ronabia St.-Lag. = Psychotria
- Stellix Noronha = Psychotria
- Straussia A.Gray = Psychotria
- Sulcanux Raf. = Psychotria
- Suteria DC. = Psychotria
- Tapogomea Aubl. = Psychotria
- Trevirania Heynh. = Psychotria
- Trigonopyren Bremek. = Pyschotria
- Uragoga Baill. = Psychotria
