= Syzygium pachyphyllum =

Conservation status
- Least Concern (IUCN 3.1)

Scientific classification
- Kingdom: Plantae
- Clade: Tracheophytes
- Clade: Angiosperms
- Clade: Eudicots
- Clade: Rosids
- Order: Myrtales
- Family: Myrtaceae
- Genus: Syzygium
- Species: S. pachyphyllum

Binomial name
- Syzygium pachyphyllum (Kurz) Merr. & L.M.Perry

Synonyms
- Eugenia pachyphylla Kurz

Species of plant

Syzygium pachyphyllum, the thick-leaved jambu or thick-leaved kelat, is a species of flowering plant in the family Myrtaceae. It is native to Myanmar, Thailand, Peninsular Malaysia, Sumatra, and Borneo. A tree reaching 6 to 15 m (20 to 50 ft), it is typically found in coastal shrublands and forests at elevations from 0 to 50 m (0 to 160 ft). Recommended as a street and landscaping tree, it has been assessed as Least Concern.
