= Dolianthus =

Scientific classification
- Kingdom: Plantae
- Clade: Tracheophytes
- Clade: Angiosperms
- Clade: Eudicots
- Clade: Asterids
- Order: Gentianales
- Family: Rubiaceae
- Subfamily: Rubioideae
- Tribe: Psychotrieae
- Genus: Dolianthus; C.H.Wright

Type species
- Dolianthus vaccinioides C.H.Wright

Genus of plants

Dolianthus is a genus of flowering plants in the family Rubiaceae. The genus is endemic to New Guinea.

== Species ==
- Dolianthus archboldianus (Merr. & L.M.Perry) A.P.Davis
- Dolianthus bicolor (Merr. & L.M.Perry) A.P.Davis
- Dolianthus buxifolius (C.H.Wright) A.P.Davis
- Dolianthus clemensiae (Merr. & L.M.Perry) A.P.Davis
- Dolianthus epiphyticus (Valeton) A.P.Davis
- Dolianthus fimbristipularis (P.Royen) A.P.Davis
- Dolianthus kairoi A.P.Davis
- Dolianthus montiswilhelmii (P.Royen) A.P.Davis
- Dolianthus nummatus (P.Royen) A.P.Davis
- Dolianthus ovatifolius A.P.Davis
- Dolianthus subalpinus (P.Royen) A.P.Davis
- Dolianthus trichanthus (Merr. & L.M.Perry) A.P.Davis
- Dolianthus archboldianus C.H.Wright
