= Philidris cruda =

Scientific classification
- Domain: Eukaryota
- Kingdom: Animalia
- Phylum: Arthropoda
- Class: Insecta
- Order: Hymenoptera
- Family: Formicidae
- Subfamily: Dolichoderinae
- Genus: Philidris
- Species: P. cruda

Binomial name
- Philidris cruda (Smith, F., 1860)

Species of ant

Philidris cruda is a species of ant in the genus Philidris. Described by Smith in 1860, the species is endemic to Indonesia.
