= Anthorrhiza =

Scientific classification
- Kingdom: Plantae
- Clade: Tracheophytes
- Clade: Angiosperms
- Clade: Eudicots
- Clade: Asterids
- Order: Gentianales
- Family: Rubiaceae
- Subfamily: Rubioideae
- Tribe: Psychotrieae
- Genus: Anthorrhiza; C.R.Huxley & Jebb

Genus of plants

Anthorrhiza is a genus of myrmecophytic flowering plants in the family Rubiaceae. It is endemic to Papua New Guinea, including the Louisiade Archipelago. It is one of five ant-plant genera in the family Rubiaceae, the others being Hydnophytum, Myrmecodia, Myrmephytum, and Squamellaria.

== Species ==
- Anthorrhiza areolata C.R.Huxley & Jebb
- Anthorrhiza bracteosa C.R.Huxley & Jebb
- Anthorrhiza caerulea C.R.Huxley & Jebb
- Anthorrhiza camilla Jebb
- Anthorrhiza chrysacantha C.R.Huxley & Jebb
- Anthorrhiza echinella C.R.Huxley & Jebb
- Anthorrhiza mitis C.R.Huxley & Jebb
- Anthorrhiza recurvispina C.R.Huxley & Jebb
- Anthorrhiza stevensii C.R.Huxley & Jebb
