= Philidris laevigata =

Scientific classification
- Domain: Eukaryota
- Kingdom: Animalia
- Phylum: Arthropoda
- Class: Insecta
- Order: Hymenoptera
- Family: Formicidae
- Subfamily: Dolichoderinae
- Genus: Philidris
- Species: P. laevigata

Binomial name
- Philidris laevigata (Emery, 1895)

Species of ant

Philidris laevigata is a species of ant in the genus Philidris. Described by Carlo Emery in 1895, the species is endemic to Burma, India and China.
