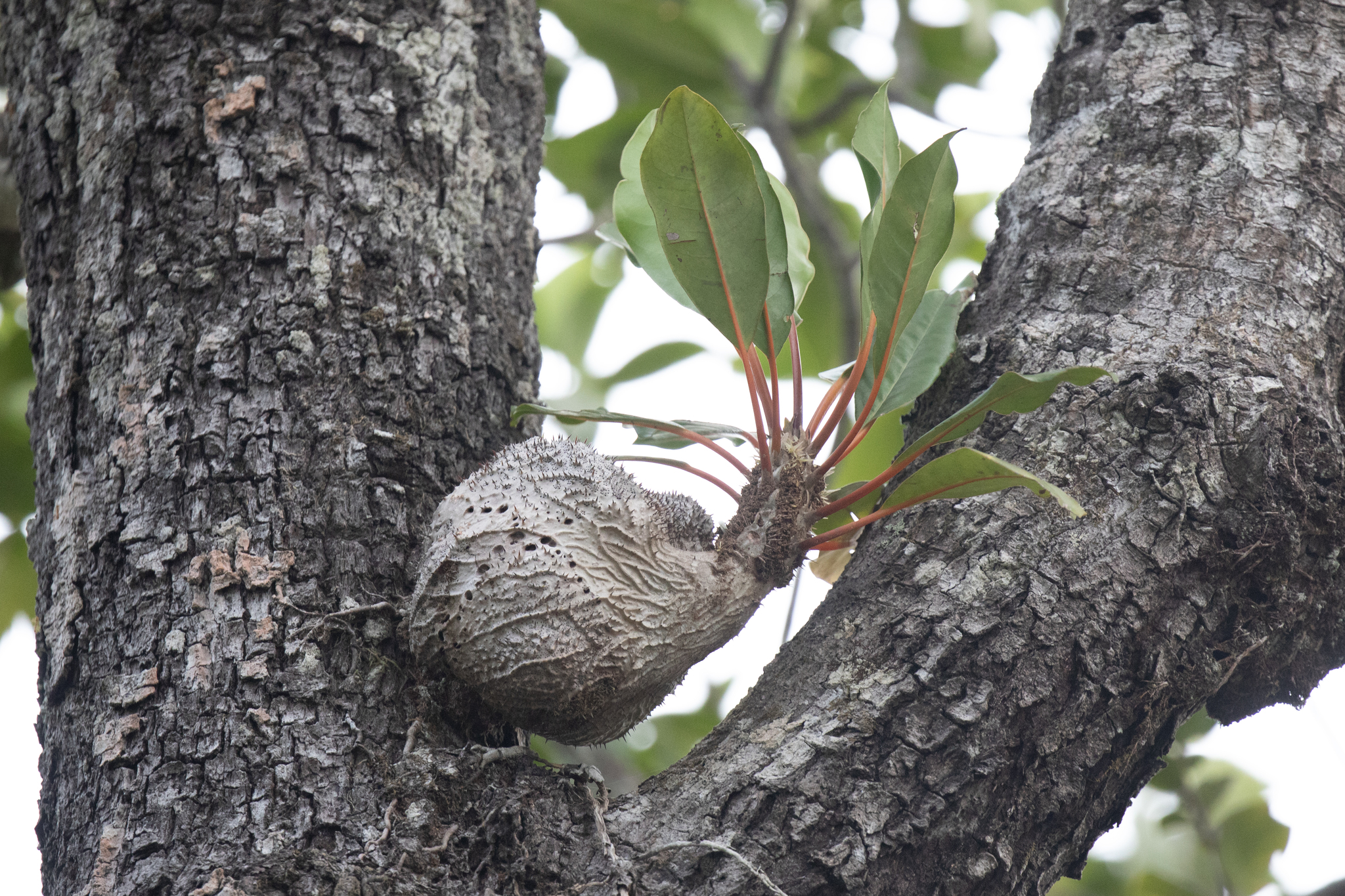
- Myrmecodia platytyrea

Scientific classification
- Kingdom: Plantae
- Clade: Tracheophytes
- Clade: Angiosperms
- Clade: Eudicots
- Clade: Asterids
- Order: Gentianales
- Family: Rubiaceae
- Genus: Myrmecodia
- Species: M. platytyrea

Binomial name
- Myrmecodia platytyrea Becc.

= Myrmecodia platytyrea =

Species of plant

Myrmecodia platytyrea is a myrmecophilous (ant-loving) plant in the gardenia family Rubiaceae native to New Guinea and northern Australia. The species was described in 1884 by Italian botanist Odoardo Beccari. It has two subspecies. Plants of this species have been used in traditional medicine in West Papua and have been investigated for their effects in potentially treating various diseases.
