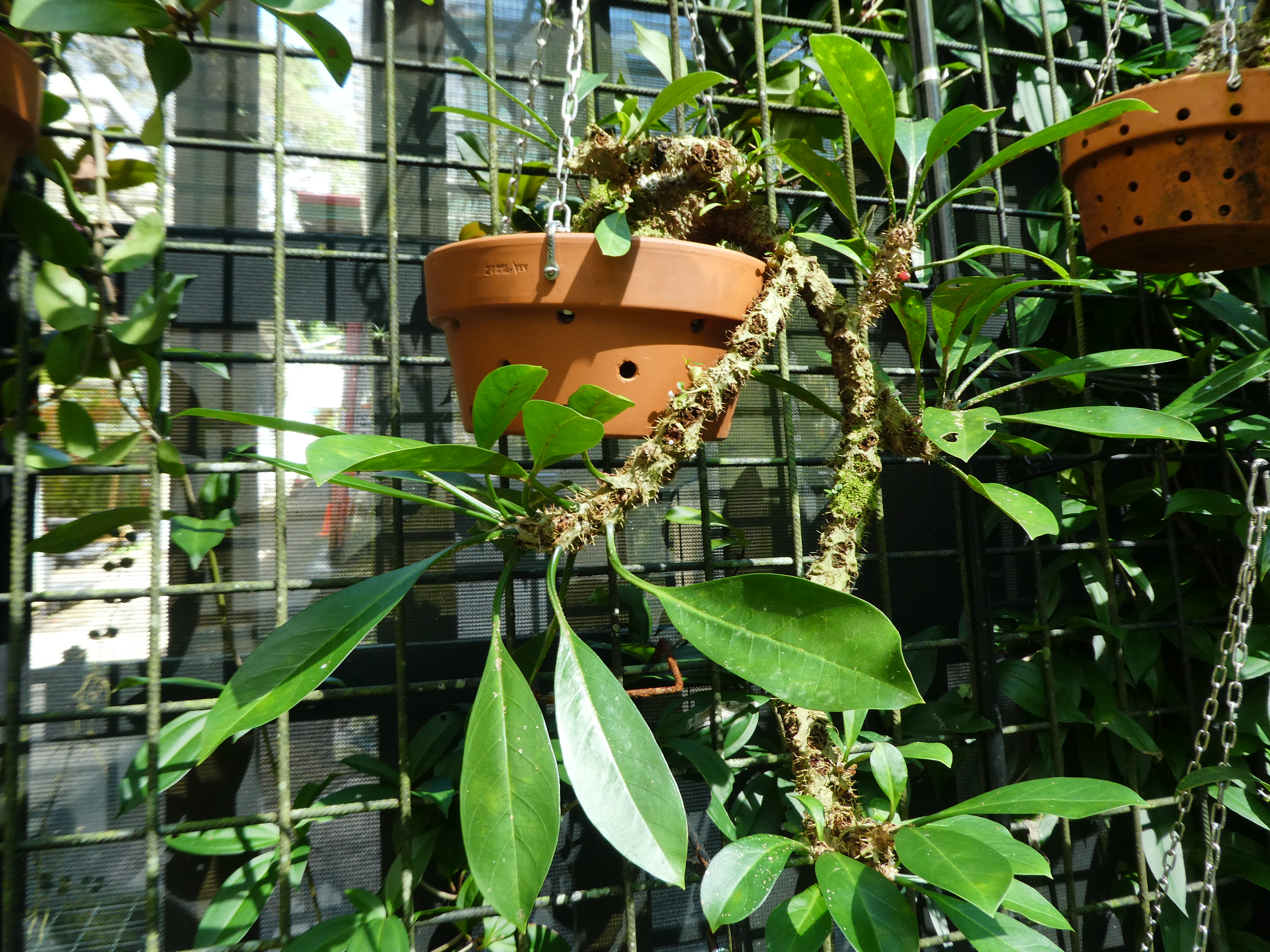
- Growing at Cairns Botanic Gardens

Scientific classification
- Kingdom: Plantae
- Clade: Tracheophytes
- Clade: Angiosperms
- Clade: Eudicots
- Clade: Asterids
- Order: Gentianales
- Family: Rubiaceae
- Genus: Myrmecodia
- Species: M. tuberosa

Binomial name
- Myrmecodia tuberosa Jack

Synonyms
- 28 synonyms: Lasiostoma tuberosum (Jack) Spreng.; Bantiala rubra Dauphinot; Myrmecodia amboinensis Becc.; Myrmecodia apoensis Elmer; Myrmecodia armata DC.; Myrmecodia bullosa Becc.; Myrmecodia dahlii K.Schum.; Myrmecodia echinata F.Muell.; Myrmecodia echinata Gaudich.; Myrmecodia goramensis Becc.; Myrmecodia hispida A.Rich.; Myrmecodia inermis DC.; Myrmecodia kandariensis Becc.; Myrmecodia lanceolata Valeton; Myrmecodia menadensis Becc.; Myrmecodia muelleri Becc.; Myrmecodia oninensis Becc.; Myrmecodia paucispina Valeton; Myrmecodia peekelii Valeton; Myrmecodia pentasperma K.Schum.; Myrmecodia pulvinata Becc.; Myrmecodia rumphii Becc.; Myrmecodia salomonensis Becc.; Myrmecodia sibuyanensis Elmer; Myrmecodia sorsogonensis Elmer; Myrmecodia tuberosa Becc. ex Treub; Myrmecodia urdanetensis Elmer; Myrmecodia vivipara Warb.

= Myrmecodia tuberosa =

Species of epiphyte

Myrmecodia tuberosa, one of many plants commonly known as ant plant, is a species of epiphytic plant in the family Rubiaceae. The species has a symbiotic relationship with some ant species where ants use the hollow body of the plant as shelter, defend the plant from other insects, and provide nutrients to the plant through their waste.

== Gallery ==
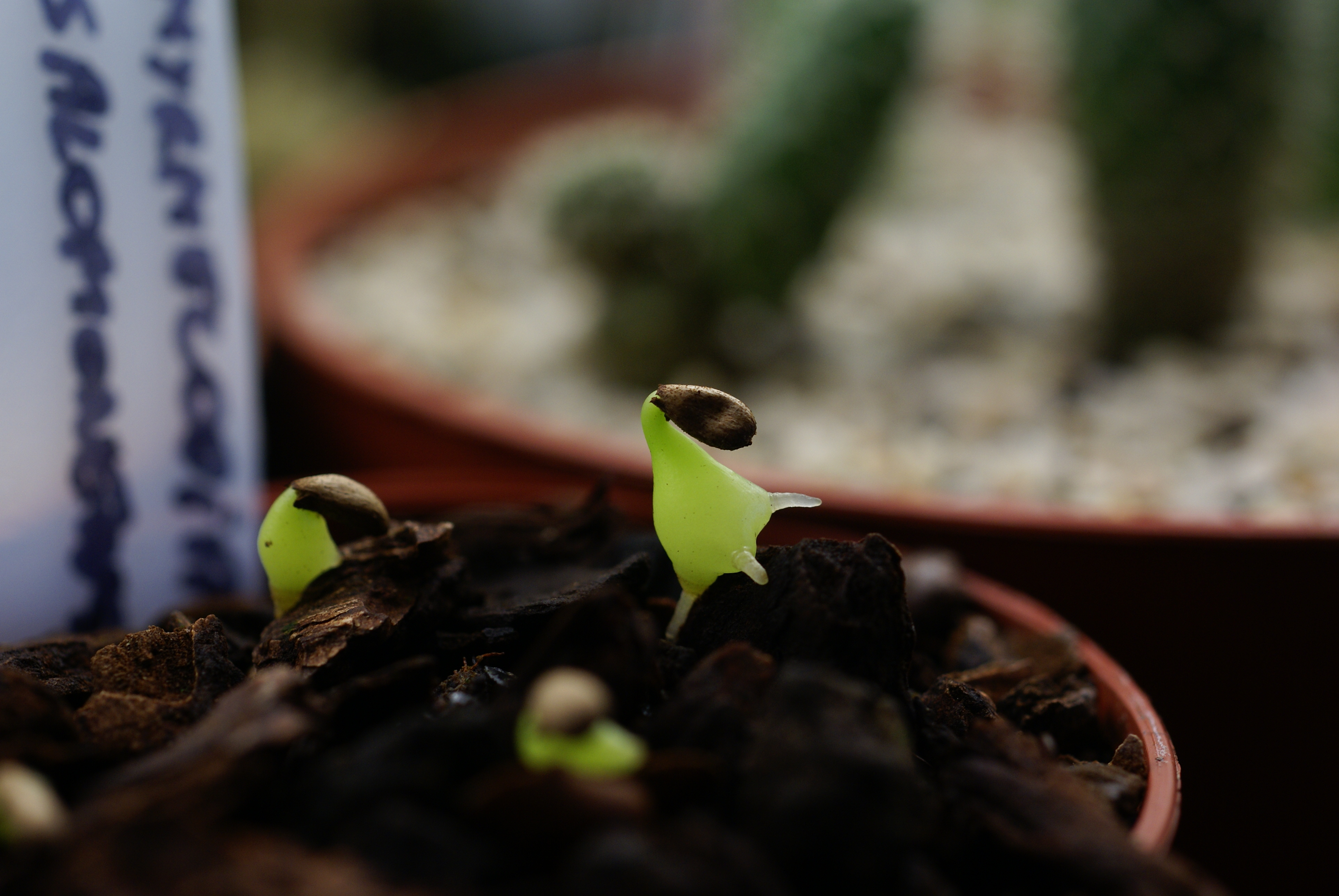
Myrmecodia tuberosa seedling

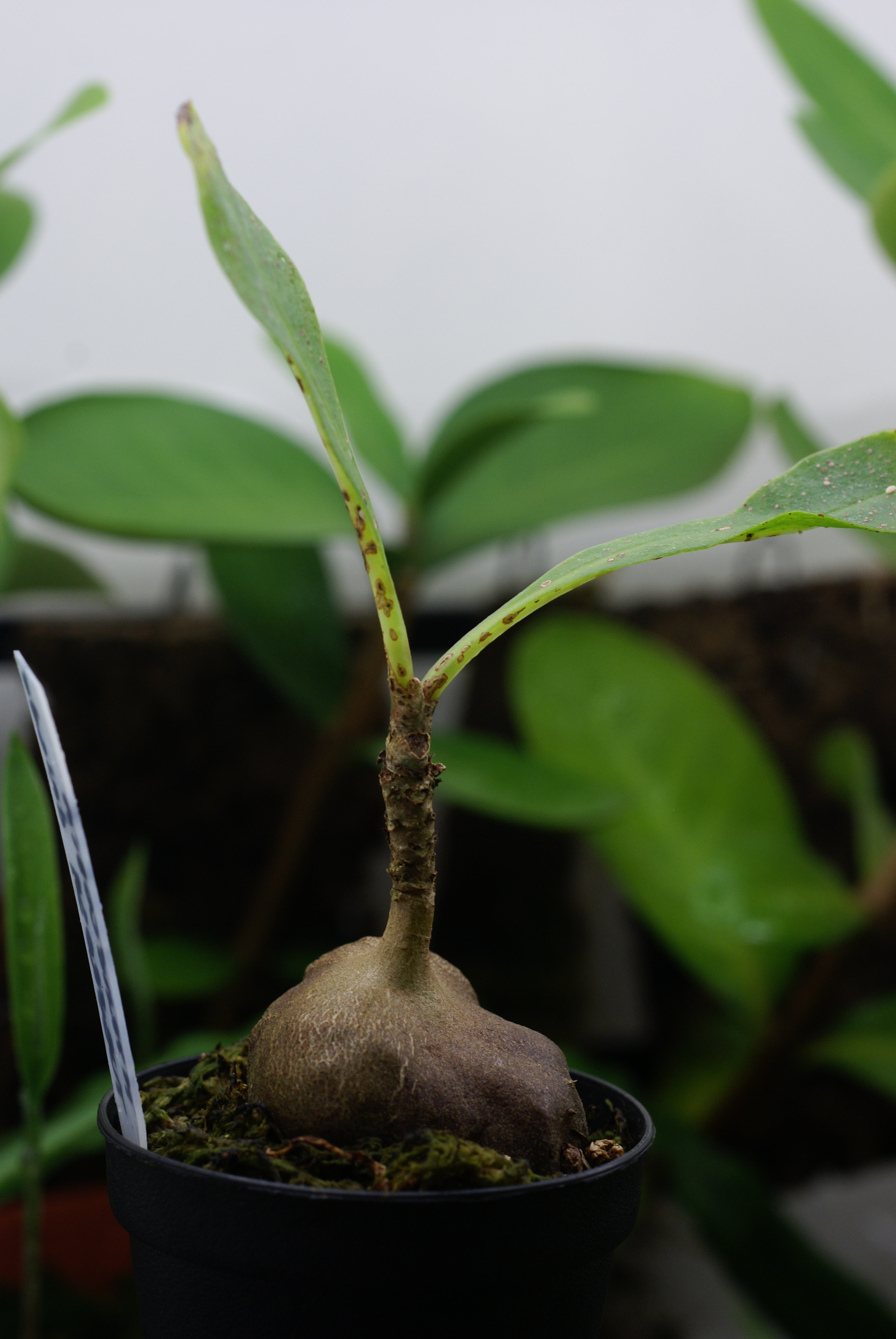
Myrmecodia tuberosa young plant

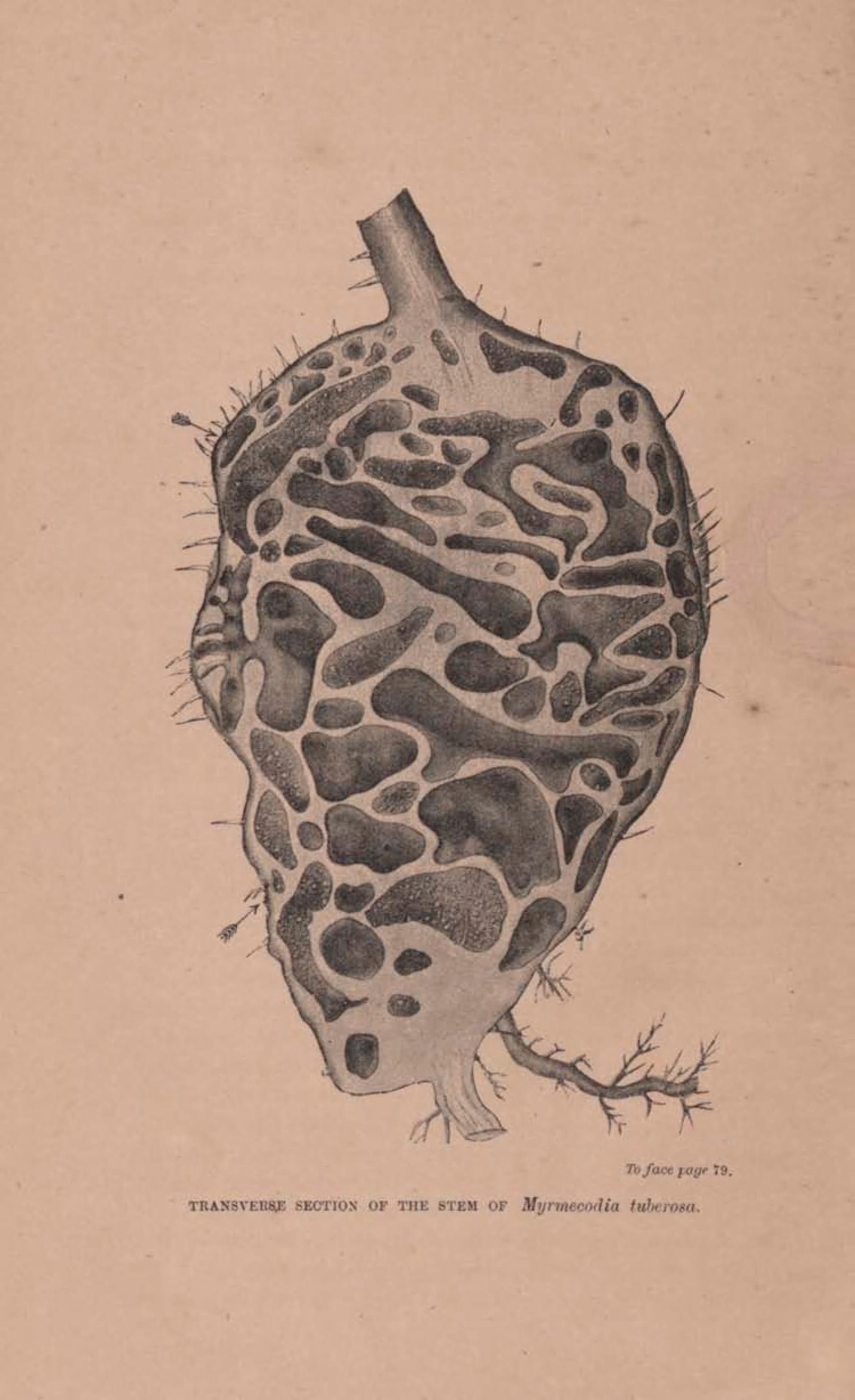
Illustration of tuberous base
