= Philidris myrmecodiae =

Scientific classification
- Domain: Eukaryota
- Kingdom: Animalia
- Phylum: Arthropoda
- Class: Insecta
- Order: Hymenoptera
- Family: Formicidae
- Subfamily: Dolichoderinae
- Genus: Philidris
- Species: P. myrmecodiae

Binomial name
- Philidris myrmecodiae (Emery, 1887)

Subspecies
- Philidris myrmecodiae andamanensis Forel, 1903; Philidris myrmecodiae mandibularis Santschi, 1928; Philidris myrmecodiae nigriventris Donisthorpe, 1941

Species of ant

Philidris myrmecodiae is a species of ant in the genus Philidris. Described by Carlo Emery in 1887, the species is endemic to Asia.
