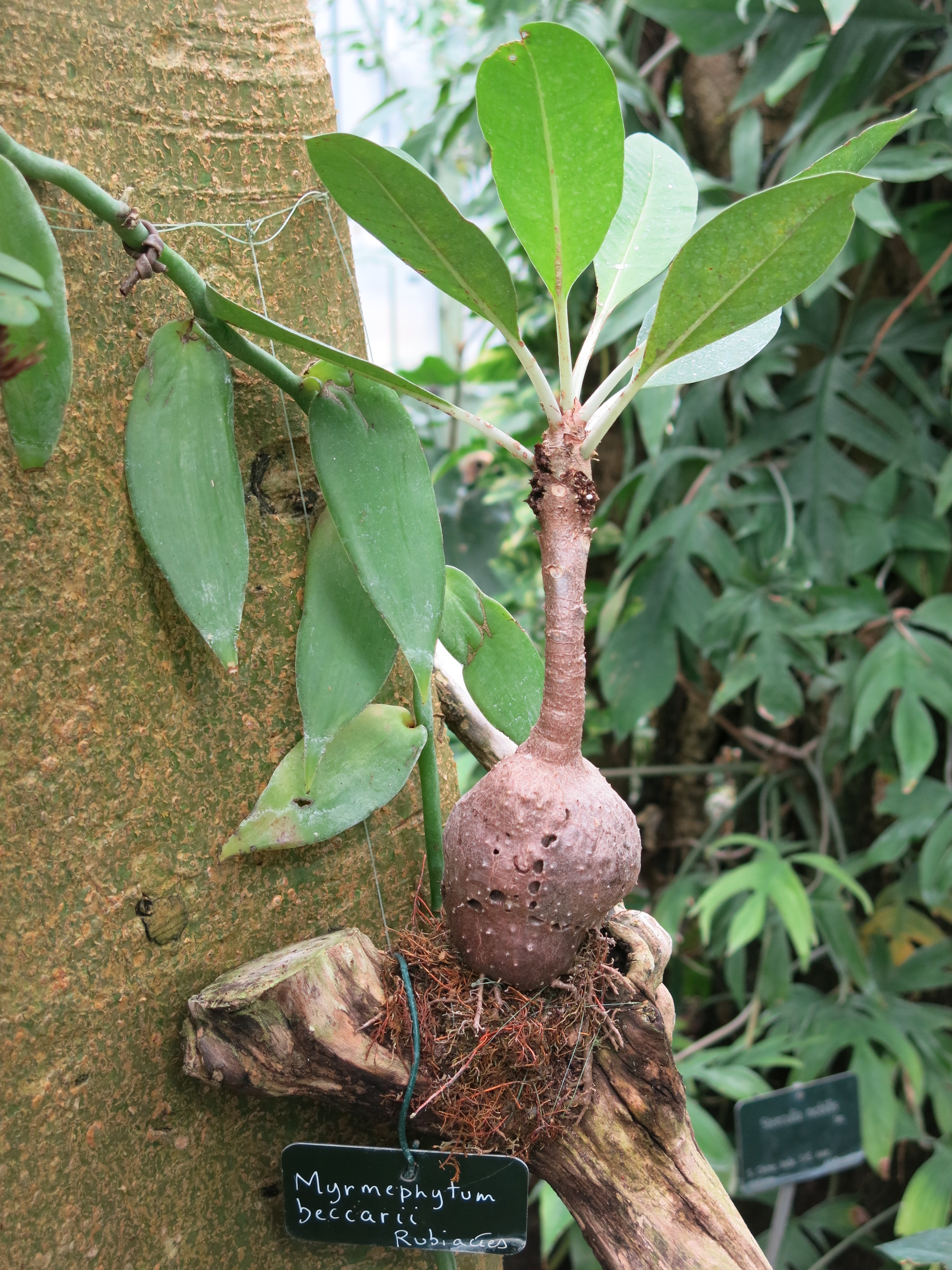
- Myrmephytum beccarii

Scientific classification
- Kingdom: Plantae
- Clade: Tracheophytes
- Clade: Angiosperms
- Clade: Eudicots
- Clade: Asterids
- Order: Gentianales
- Family: Rubiaceae
- Subfamily: Rubioideae
- Tribe: Psychotrieae
- Genus: Myrmephytum; Becc.

Species
- See text

Synonyms
- Myrmedoma Becc.

= Myrmephytum =

Genus of plants

Myrmephytum is a genus of myrmecophytic flowering plants in the family Rubiaceae. It is distributed from central Malesia to New Guinea.

It is one of five ant-plant genera in the family Rubiaceae, the others being Anthorrhiza, Hydnophytum, Myrmecodia, and Squamellaria.

== Species ==
The following list of 5 species is sourced from The Plant List.

- Myrmephytum arfakianum (Becc.) Huxley & Jebb
- Myrmephytum beccarii Elmer
- Myrmephytum moniliforme Huxley & Jebb
- Myrmephytum naumannii (Warb.) Huxley & Jebb
- Myrmephytum selebicum (Becc.) Becc.
