= Philidris notiala =

Scientific classification
- Domain: Eukaryota
- Kingdom: Animalia
- Phylum: Arthropoda
- Class: Insecta
- Order: Hymenoptera
- Family: Formicidae
- Subfamily: Dolichoderinae
- Genus: Philidris
- Species: P. notiala

Binomial name
- Philidris notiala Zhou & Zheng, 1998

Species of ant

Philidris notiala is a species of ant in the genus Philidris. Described by Zhou and Zheng in 1998, the species is endemic to China.
