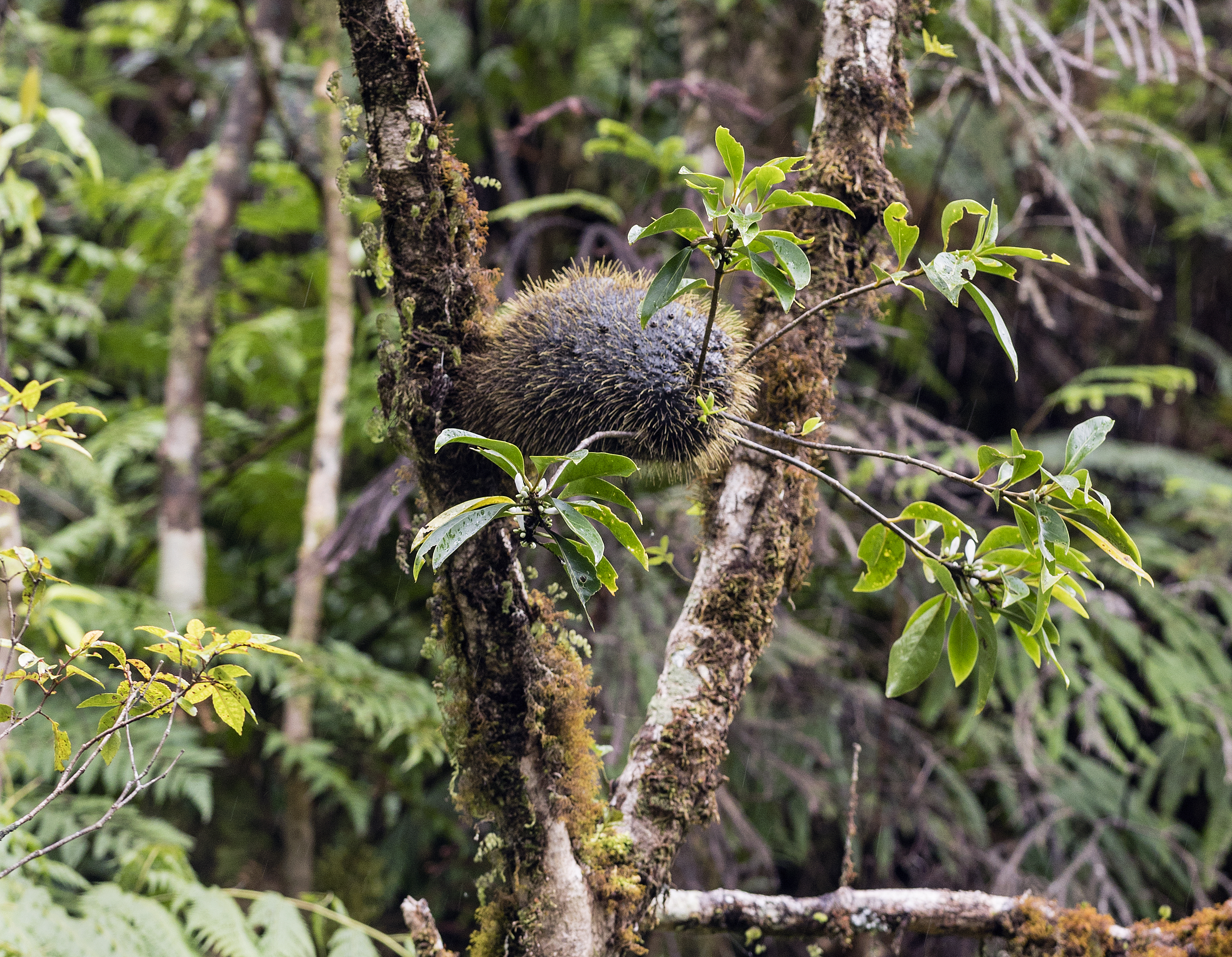
- S. imberbis on the island of Taveuni at about 2,200 feet elevation in forest along Somosomo Creek

Scientific classification
- Kingdom: Plantae
- Clade: Tracheophytes
- Clade: Angiosperms
- Clade: Eudicots
- Clade: Asterids
- Order: Gentianales
- Family: Rubiaceae
- Subfamily: Rubioideae
- Tribe: Psychotrieae
- Genus: Squamellaria; Becc. (1886)

Species
- see text

= Squamellaria =

Genus of plants

Squamellaria is a genus of myrmecophytic flowering plants in the family Rubiaceae. It includes eight species native to the Solomon Islands, Vanuatu, and Fiji.

== Ecology ==
The Fijian species of this genus are symbiotic with ants of the species Philidris nagasau, which live inside the tuberous stems of these plants. The ants remove seeds from the fruit and place them in locations where they are likely to succeed as epiphytes. They also fertilise the plants with their manure, and defend them against herbivores. An ant colony may occupy dozens of Squamellaria tubers.

It is one of five ant-plant genera in the family Rubiaceae, the others being Anthorrhiza, Hydnophytum, Myrmecodia, and Myrmephytum.

== Species ==
Eight species are accepted:

- Squamellaria grayi Chomicki & Wistuba – Fiji
- Squamellaria guppyana (Becc.) Chomicki – Solomon Islands
- Squamellaria huxleyana Chomicki – Fiji
- Squamellaria imberbis (A.Gray) Becc. (syn. S. wilsonii) – Fiji (Vanua Levu)
- Squamellaria kajewskii (Merr. & L.M.Perry) Chomicki – Solomon Islands (Bougainville, Santa Isabel)
- Squamellaria major A.C.Sm. – Fiji (Taveuni: Mt. Manuka)
- Squamellaria thekii Jebb – Fiji
- Squamellaria vanuatuensis Jebb & C.R.Huxley ex Chomicki & S.S.Renner – Vanuatu
