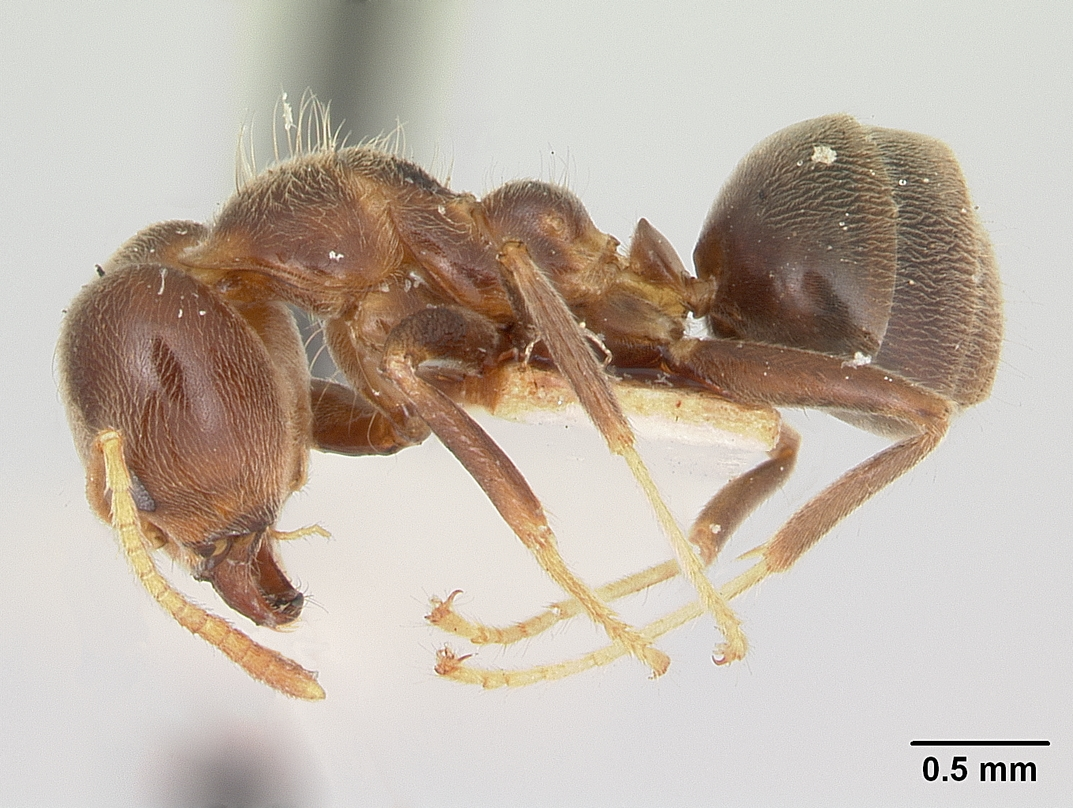

Scientific classification
- Domain: Eukaryota
- Kingdom: Animalia
- Phylum: Arthropoda
- Class: Insecta
- Order: Hymenoptera
- Family: Formicidae
- Subfamily: Dolichoderinae
- Genus: Philidris
- Species: P. brunnea

Binomial name
- Philidris brunnea (Donisthorpe, 1949)

= Philidris brunnea =

Species of ant

Philidris brunnea is a species of ant in the genus Philidris. Described by Donisthorpe in 1949, the species is endemic to New Guinea.
