= Philidris jiugongshanensis =

Scientific classification
- Domain: Eukaryota
- Kingdom: Animalia
- Phylum: Arthropoda
- Class: Insecta
- Order: Hymenoptera
- Family: Formicidae
- Subfamily: Dolichoderinae
- Genus: Philidris
- Species: P. jiugongshanensis

Binomial name
- Philidris jiugongshanensis Wang, W. & Wu, 2007

Species of ant

Philidris jiugongshanensis is a species of ant in the genus Philidris. Described in Wang and Wu in 2007, the species is endemic to China.
