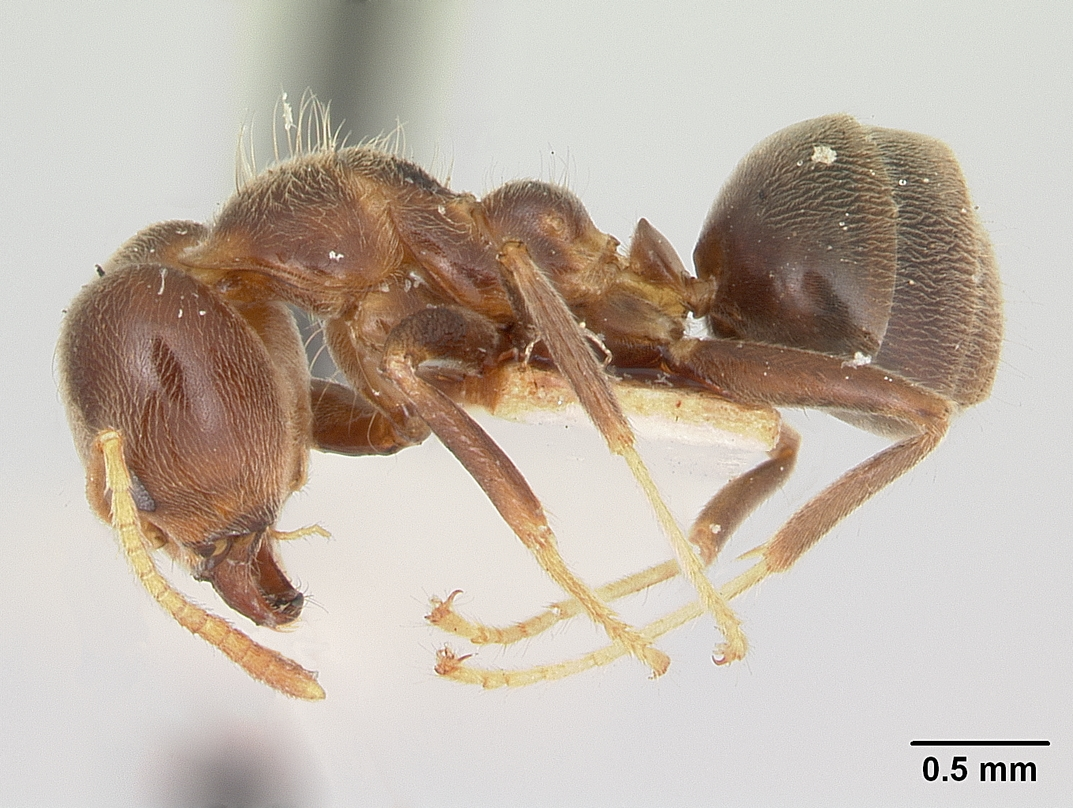
- Philidris brunnea worker

Scientific classification
- Kingdom: Animalia
- Phylum: Arthropoda
- Class: Insecta
- Order: Hymenoptera
- Family: Formicidae
- Subfamily: Dolichoderinae
- Tribe: Leptomyrmecini
- Genus: Philidris; Shattuck, 1992

Type species
- Formica cordata

Diversity
- 9 species

= Philidris =

Genus of ants

Philidris is a genus of ants in the subfamily Dolichoderinae. The genus is known from tropical forests from eastern India to northern Australia. It is similar to the genus Iridomyrmex, from where the type species was transferred from by Shattuck (1992).

== Species ==
- Philidris brunnea (Donisthorpe, 1949)
- Philidris cordata (Smith, 1859)
- Philidris cruda (Smith, 1860)
- Philidris jiugongshanensis Wang & Wu, 2007
- Philidris laevigata (Emery, 1895)
- Philidris myrmecodiae (Emery, 1887)
- Philidris nagasau (Mann, 1921)
- Philidris notiala Zhou & Zheng, 1998
- Philidris pubescens (Donisthorpe, 1949)
