= Philidris nagasau =

Scientific classification
- Kingdom: Animalia
- Phylum: Arthropoda
- Clade: Pancrustacea
- Class: Insecta
- Order: Hymenoptera
- Family: Formicidae
- Subfamily: Dolichoderinae
- Genus: Philidris
- Species: P. nagasau

Binomial name
- Philidris nagasau (W. M. Mann, 1921)

Synonyms
- Philidris nagasau agnatus W. M. Mann, 1921; Philidris nagasau alticola W. M. Mann, 1921

Species of ant

Philidris nagasau is a species of ant in the genus Philidris. Described by William M. Mann in 1921, the species is endemic to Fiji.

Philidris nagasau makes its living by planting seeds of epiphytes such as Squamellaria in the bark of host trees and tending them like a garden. Their planting habits share a remarkable similarity to that of humans. They are able to identify the seeds of their preferred plant, plant these seeds, guard their plots from potential predators, and finally use their own feces to fertilize the young seedling. There is also evidence that these ants lost their ability to nest before Squamellaria developed domatia for these ants to reside. This suggests that P. nagasau selectively breed Squamellaria with wider openings that eventually developed into domatia.

== See Also ==
- Non-human agriculture
