= Streblosa =

Scientific classification
- Kingdom: Plantae
- Clade: Tracheophytes
- Clade: Angiosperms
- Clade: Eudicots
- Clade: Asterids
- Order: Gentianales
- Family: Rubiaceae
- Genus: Streblosa; Korth.

Genus of plants

Streblosa is a genus of flowering plants belonging to the family Rubiaceae.

Its native range is Thailand to Malesia.

== Species ==
Species:

- Streblosa anambasica Bremek.
- Streblosa assimilis Bremek.
- Streblosa axilliflora Merr.
- Streblosa bracteata Ridl.
- Streblosa bracteolata Merr.
- Streblosa bullata Merr.
- Streblosa chlamydantha Bremek.
- Streblosa deliensis Bremek.
- Streblosa glabrata Valeton
- Streblosa hypomalaca Bremek.
- Streblosa johannis-winkleri Merr.
- Streblosa lampongensis Bremek.
- Streblosa lanceolata Merr.
- Streblosa leiophylla Bremek.
- Streblosa longiscapa Bremek.
- Streblosa maxima Bremek.
- Streblosa microcarpa Ridl.
- Streblosa multiglandulosa Merr.
- Streblosa myriocarpa Merr.
- Streblosa palawanensis Bremek.
- Streblosa polyantha Korth.
- Streblosa scabridula Bremek.
- Streblosa tortilis (Blume) Korth.
- Streblosa undulata Korth.
- Streblosa urticina Stapf
