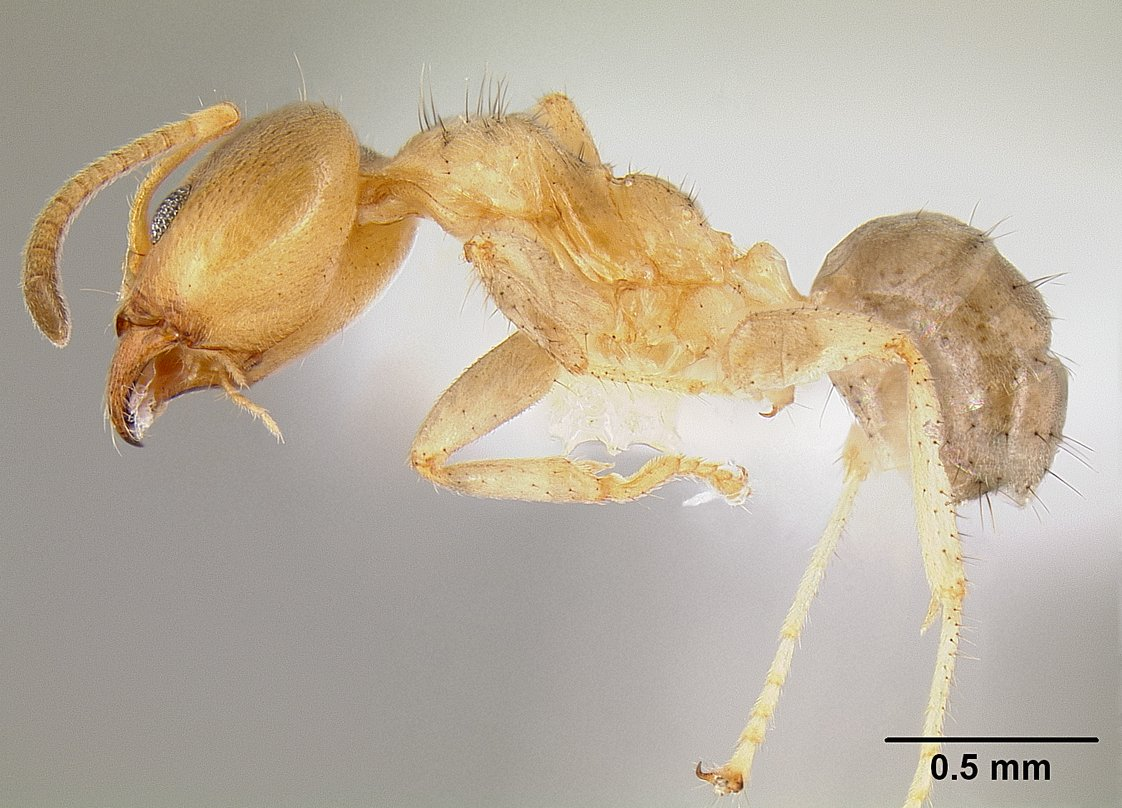

Scientific classification
- Domain: Eukaryota
- Kingdom: Animalia
- Phylum: Arthropoda
- Class: Insecta
- Order: Hymenoptera
- Family: Formicidae
- Subfamily: Dolichoderinae
- Genus: Philidris
- Species: P. cordata

Binomial name
- Philidris cordata (Smith, F., 1859)

Subspecies
- Philidris cordata stewartii Forel, 1893; Philidris cordata fusca Forel, 1901; Philidris cordata protensa Forel, 1911

= Philidris cordata =

Species of ant

Philidris cordata is a species of ant in the genus Philidris. Described by Smith in 1859, the species is endemic to Indonesia and New Guinea. This species is a frequent inhabitant of the ant plant genera: Myrmecodia and Hydnophytum.
