= Leonard John Brass =

Australian born American botanist (1900–1971)

Leonard John Brass (17 May 1900 – 29 August 1971) was an Australian and American botanist, botanical collector and explorer.

== Early life ==
Brass was born at Toowoomba, Queensland, and he was trained at the Queensland Herbarium.

== Career ==
Brass collected plant specimens for the Queensland Herbarium from the 1930s to the 1960s, as well as participating in several international expeditions to New Guinea, the Solomon Islands and Africa.

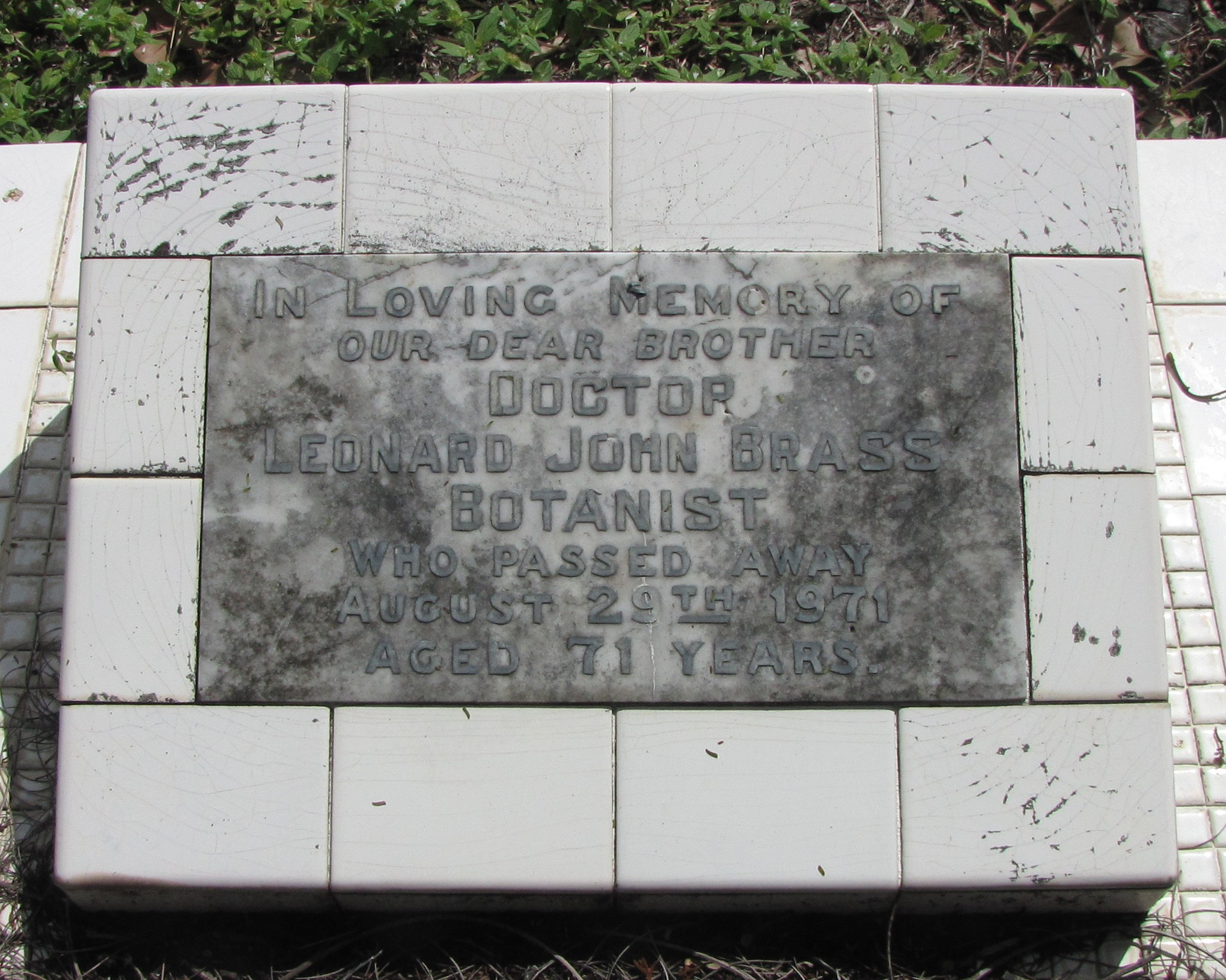
Grave of Dr Leonard Brass in Cairns Martyn Street Cemetery

From 1939 to 1966 Brass was an associate curator of the Archbold Expedition collections with the American Museum of Natural History. He was associated with the Archbold Biological Station at Lake Placid, Florida, for which he helped to formulate the organizational structure it has today, and also where he lived between expeditions. In the course of his many expeditions to New Guinea he was a major collector of plant specimens for the Arnold Arboretum in Massachusetts, including many types. The New Guinea species Myrmecodia brassii is named after him. He was especially interested in the relationship between the floras of Australia and New Guinea.

Brass was director of field operations for an expedition in 1949–50 to tropical Africa, sponsored by the Upjohn and Penick companies, to find precursors for the manufacture of cortisone. Later he was an advisor to an Arnold Arboretum study to search for medical plants in the western Pacific, as well as serving on a National Science Foundation panel regarding botanical study of the islands of the Indian Ocean.

Brass served in the Canadian army during the Second World War, became a naturalised citizen of the United States in 1947 and received an honorary doctorate from Florida State University at Tallahassee in 1962. In Florida he was active, with Richard Archbold, in the establishment of the Corkscrew Swamp Sanctuary in 1955.

== Later life ==
Brass retired from the American Museum of Natural History in 1966 and returned to Australia, where he died at Cairns, Queensland in 1971. Brass was married to Maria Schiavone, who died in 1954.

== Expeditions ==
Expeditions Brass participated in include:

- New Guinea (1925–1926) for the Arnold Arboretum
- Solomon Islands (1932–1933) for the Arnold Arboretum
- New Guinea (1933–1934), first Archbold New Guinea Expedition, plants going to the Arnold Arboretum
- New Guinea (1936–1937), second Archbold New Guinea Expedition, plants going to the Arnold Arboretum
- New Guinea (1938–1939), third Archbold New Guinea Expedition, plants going to the Arnold Arboretum
- Nyasaland (1946), Vernay Nyasaland Expedition, plants going to the New York Botanical Garden
- Cape York Peninsula, Australia (1948), Archbold Cape York Expedition, plants going to the Arnold Arboretum
- Tropical Africa (1949–1950), Upjohn-Penick Expedition
- New Guinea (1953), fourth Archbold New Guinea Expedition, plants going to the Arnold Arboretum
- New Guinea (1956–1957), fifth Archbold New Guinea Expedition, plants going to the Rijksherbarium at Leiden, Netherlands
- New Guinea (1959), sixth Archbold New Guinea Expedition, plants going to the US National Herbarium at Washington, DC, United States
