= Lily May Perry =

Canadian botanist (1895–1992)

- Born: January 5, 1895; Havelock, New Brunswick
- Died: March 11, 1992 (aged 97); Hingham, Massachusetts
- Citizenship: American
- Education: Acadia University, Radcliffe College, Washington University in St. Louis
- Scientific career
- Fields: botanist
- Workplaces: Harvard University Herbaria
- Doctoral advisor: J. M. Greenman
- Author abbrev. (botany): L.M.Perry

Lily May Perry (1895–1992) was a Canadian-American botanist who worked at Arnold Arboretum and is most known for detailed compilation of information on medicinal plants of East and Southeast Asia and her assistance with the Flora of New Guinea. Perry also has the legacy of authoring the third highest number of land plant species among female scientists, in total naming 414 species.

== Early life and education ==
Perry was born in Havelock, New Brunswick, Canada on January 5, 1895. Her early education was in a one-room school. She received teacher training at Provincial Normal School in Fredericton. After a short period of teaching, she attended Acadia University and received a B.S. in Biology with honors in 1921. She spent an additional 3 years teaching before being admitted to Radcliffe College, where she took coursework from Prof. E. C. Jeffries and M. L. Fernald and received her M.A. in 1925. In 1930, she received a fellowship for doctoral study under J. M. Greenman at Washington University in St. Louis. She completed her doctoral thesis on North American species of Verbena in 1933. She became a U.S. citizen in 1938.

== Career ==
In the summer of 1929, she spent a month collecting plant specimens on St. Paul Island (Nova Scotia) with Dr. Muriel V. Roscoe, leading to the production of a vascular flora of the island published in 1931. After finishing her Ph.D. she took temporary positions at University of Georgia and Sweet Briar College. Upon being unable to locate permanent position in Canada, she was re-hired by M.L. Fernald as an assistant for Gray Herbarium at Harvard. In 1936, E. D. Merrill had her transferred to the Arnold Arboretum to assist with organizing collections from New Guinea and other parts of the Pacific. Perry reached retirement age in 1960, but stayed on at Arnold Arboretum until 1964 to finish Medicinal Plants of East and Southeast Asia: Attributed Properties and Uses.

== Awards ==
- Honorary Doctorate from Acadia University in 1971

In 1997, botanist T.G.Hartley published Perryodendron is a monotypic genus of flowering plants belonging to the family Rutaceae in New Guinea. The only known species is Perryodendron parviflorum. The name is in honour of Lily Perry.

== Selected works ==
- Perry, Lily M. (1929), "A Tentative Revision Of Alchemilla § Lachemilla", Contributions from the Gray Herbarium of Harvard University, 84 (84): 1, 3–57, doi:10.5962/p.336113, JSTOR 41764062, S2CID 249080030
- Perry, Lily M. (1933). A revision of the North American species of Verbena. "Annals of the Missouri botanical garden." 20(2):239–362.
- Perry, Lily M. (1933). The vascular flora of St. Paul Island, Nova Scotia. "Rhodora." 33(389):105–132.
- Lam, H. J.(trans. L. M. Perry). (1945). Fragmenta Papuana: observations of a naturalist in the Netherlands New Guinea. Sargentia. 5:1–197.
- Perry, Lily M. (1980). Medicinal Plants of East and Southeast Asia: Attributed Properties and Uses. Cambridge: MIT Press.
- A collection of Perry's papers is held in the Library of the Arnold Arboretum.
