= Medicosma heterophylla =

Scientific classification
- Kingdom: Plantae
- Clade: Tracheophytes
- Clade: Angiosperms
- Clade: Eudicots
- Clade: Rosids
- Order: Sapindales
- Family: Rutaceae
- Genus: Medicosma
- Species: M. heterophylla

Binomial name
- Medicosma heterophylla T.G.Hartley

Species of tree

Medicosma heterophylla is a species of small tree in the family Rutaceae and is endemic to a restricted area of far north Queensland. It has simple and trifoliate, elliptical leaves and leaflets, and cream-coloured to pink or reddish flowers borne singly or in small groups in leaf axils.

== Description ==
Medicosma heterophylla is a tree that typically grows to a height of 7 mm (0.28 in). The leaves are simple and trifoliate, the simple leaves elliptical, 38–70 mm (1.5–2.8 in) long and 18–30 mm (0.71–1.18 in) wide on a petiole 2–15 mm (0.079–0.591 in) long. The trifoliate leaves have a petiole 15–60 mm (0.59–2.36 in) long, the leaflets elliptical, 35–80 mm (1.4–3.1 in) long and 13–30 mm (0.51–1.18 in) wide. The flowers are arranged singly or in small groups up to 12 mm (0.47 in) long, each flower on a pedicel 0.5–1.5 mm (0.020–0.059 in) long. The sepals are 1.5–2 mm (0.059–0.079 in) long and glabrous and the petals are cream-coloured to pink or reddish, 3–4 mm (0.12–0.16 in) long and densely covered on the back with soft hairs flattened against the surface. Flowering occurs from February to July and the fruit is a follicle 4.5–5 mm (0.18–0.20 in) long.

== Taxonomy ==
Medicosma heterophylla was first formally described in 1985 by Thomas Gordon Hartley in the Australian Journal of Botany from specimens collected by Paul Irwin Forster in 1994 on the track to Pinnacle Rock near Karnak (near Mossman).

== Distribution and habitat ==
This medicosma grows in rainforest and cloud forest at altitudes between 650 and 1,000 m (2,130 and 3,280 ft). It occurs along Roaring Meg Creek and near Karnak in far north Queensland.

== Conservation status ==
This species is classified as of "least concern" under the Queensland Government Nature Conservation Act 1992.
