= Hoya dennisii =

Scientific classification
- Kingdom: Plantae
- Clade: Tracheophytes
- Clade: Angiosperms
- Clade: Eudicots
- Clade: Asterids
- Order: Gentianales
- Family: Apocynaceae
- Genus: Hoya
- Species: H. dennisii

Binomial name
- Hoya dennisii P.I.Forst. & Liddle

Species of plant

Hoya dennisii is a species of flowering plant in the family Apocynaceae. It is native to the wet tropics of the Solomon Islands. A vining epiphyte, it is valued as a houseplant by Hoya enthusiasts due to its restrained growth habit, and for not dripping nectar from its flowers.
