= Medicosma mulgraveana =

Scientific classification
- Kingdom: Plantae
- Clade: Tracheophytes
- Clade: Angiosperms
- Clade: Eudicots
- Clade: Rosids
- Order: Sapindales
- Family: Rutaceae
- Genus: Medicosma
- Species: M. mulgraveana

Binomial name
- Medicosma mulgraveana T.G.Hartley

Species of tree

Medicosma mulgraveana is a species of small tree in the family Rutaceae and is endemic to a restricted area of far north Queensland. It has mostly trifoliate leaves with elliptical to egg-shaped leaflets and white flowers borne in small groups in leaf axils.

== Description ==
Medicosma mulgraveana is a tree that typically grows to a height of 8 mm (0.31 in). The leaves are trifoliate on a petiole 15–90 mm (0.59–3.54 in) long, the leaflets elliptical to egg-shaped with the narrower end towards the base, 75–180 mm (3.0–7.1 in) long and 30–70 mm (1.2–2.8 in) wide. The flowers are arranged in small groups up to 25–120 mm (0.98–4.72 in) long, each flower on a pedicel about 1.5 mm (0.059 in) long. The sepals are 4–5.5 mm (0.16–0.22 in) long and glabrous and the petals are white, 4–5.5 mm (0.16–0.22 in) long and covered on the back with soft hairs flattened against the surface. Flowering has been observed in November and the fruit is a glabrous follicle 7.5–8 mm (0.30–0.31 in) long.

== Taxonomy ==
Medicosma mulgraveana was first formally described in 1985 by Thomas Gordon Hartley in the Australian Journal of Botany from specimens collected near the East Mulgrave River in 1975.

== Distribution and habitat ==
This medicosma grows in rainforest at an altitude of 700 m (2,300 ft) and is only known from the type location.

== Conservation status ==
This species is classified as of "least concern" under the Queensland Government Nature Conservation Act 1992.
