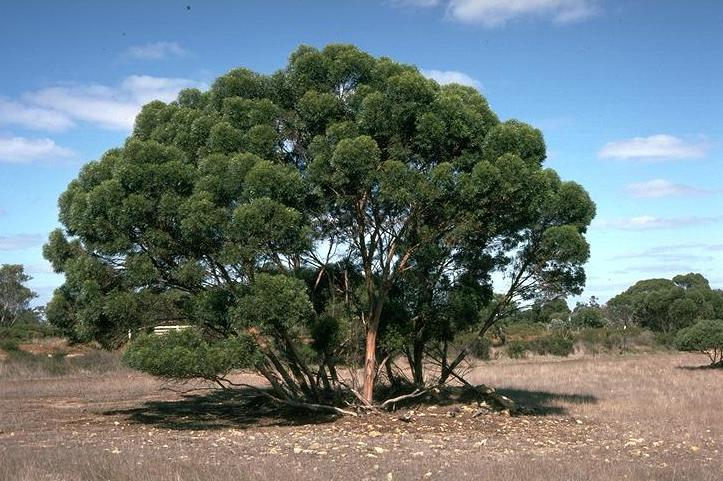
- Eucalyptus talyuberlup

Conservation status
- Near Threatened (IUCN 3.1)

Scientific classification
- Kingdom: Plantae
- Clade: Tracheophytes
- Clade: Angiosperms
- Clade: Eudicots
- Clade: Rosids
- Order: Myrtales
- Family: Myrtaceae
- Genus: Eucalyptus
- Species: E. talyuberlup

Binomial name
- Eucalyptus talyuberlup D.J.Carr & S.G.M.Carr

= Eucalyptus talyuberlup =

Stirling Range yate

Species of eucalyptus

Eucalyptus talyuberlup, commonly known as Stirling Range yate, is a species of small tree or a mallee that is endemic to a small area of the Great Southern region of Western Australia. It has smooth bark, glossy green, narrow lance-shaped adult leaves, flower buds in groups of seven to thirteen, yellowish green flowers and bell-shaped to cup-shaped fruit.

== Description ==
Eucalyptus talyuberlup is a mallee that typically grow to a height of 5 m (16 ft) or a tree to 10 m (33 ft) and forms a lignotuber. It has smooth pale grey to pinkish bark that is shed in ribbons. Young plants and coppice regrowth have egg-shaped to elliptic leaves that are 50–80 mm (2.0–3.1 in) long and 35–60 mm (1.4–2.4 in) wide. Adult leaves are arranged alternately, the same shade of glossy green on both sides, narrow lance-shaped, 45–105 mm (1.8–4.1 in) long and 6–20 mm (0.24–0.79 in) wide tapering to a petiole 5–15 mm (0.20–0.59 in) long. The flower buds are arranged in leaf axils in groups of between seven and thirteen on an unbranched peduncle 17–32 mm (0.67–1.26 in) long, the individual buds sessile. Mature buds are 19–63 mm (0.75–2.48 in) long and 3–13 mm (0.12–0.51 in) wide with a horn-shaped operculum that is three to five times as long as the floral cup. Flowering occurs between March and August and the flowers are greenish yellow. The fruit is a woody, bell-shaped to cup-shaped capsule 11–22 mm (0.43–0.87 in) long and 13–18 mm (0.51–0.71 in) wide with the valves fused at their tips.

== Taxonomy and naming ==
Eucalyptus talyuberlup was first formally described in 1980 by Denis John Carr and Stella Grace Maisie Carr in the Australian Journal of Botany from specimens they collected in 1974.

== Distribution and habitat ==
The Stirling Range yate usually grows in dense shrubland from the foothills of the Stirling Range to the Kalgan River.

== Conservation status ==
This eucalypt is classified as "not threatened" by the Western Australian Government Department of Parks and Wildlife. The IUCN Red List assesses the species as Near Threatened.

== See also ==
- List of Eucalyptus species
