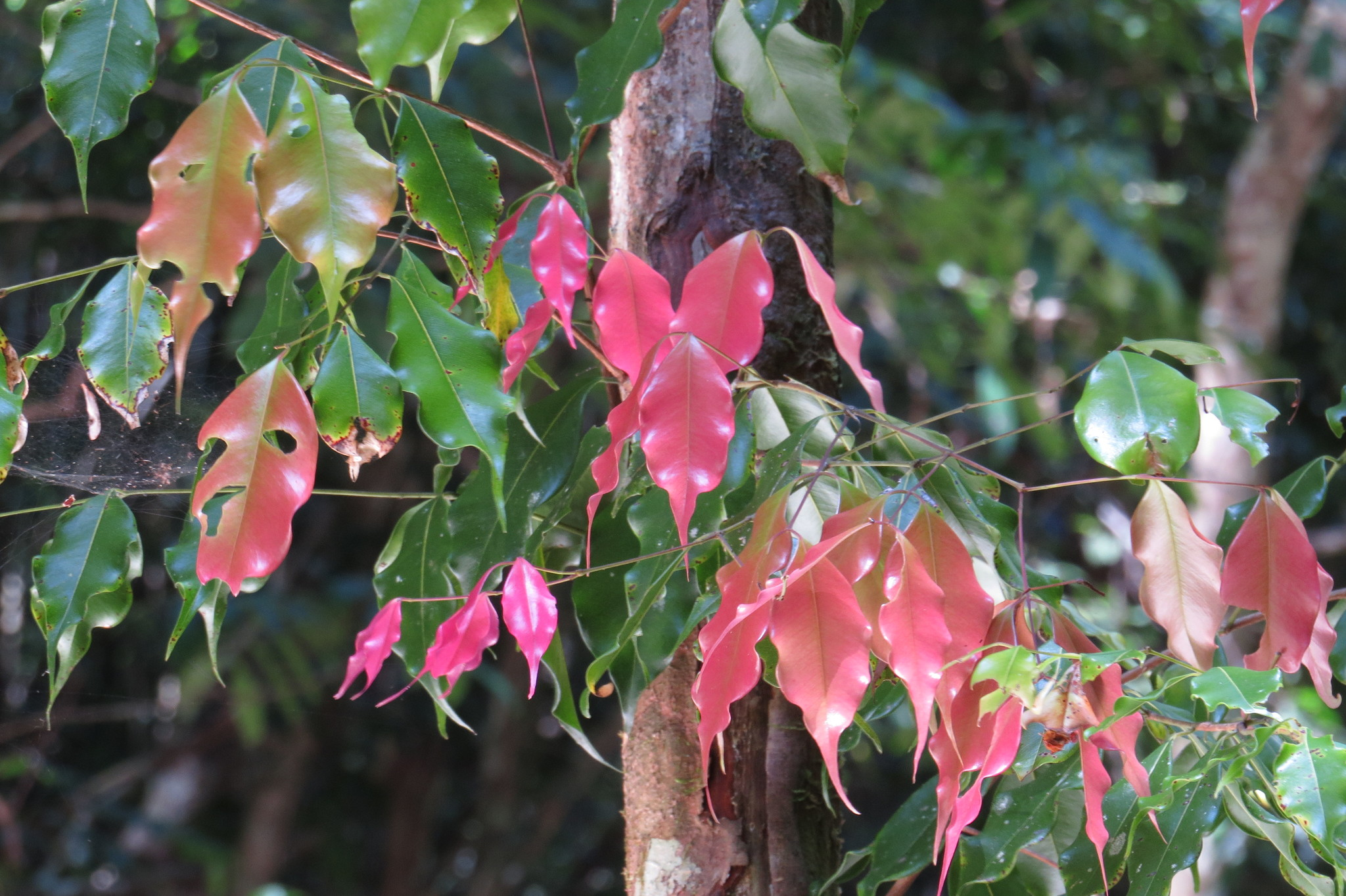

Conservation status
- Least Concern (NCA)

Scientific classification
- Kingdom: Plantae
- Clade: Embryophytes
- Clade: Tracheophytes
- Clade: Spermatophytes
- Clade: Angiosperms
- Clade: Eudicots
- Clade: Rosids
- Order: Myrtales
- Family: Myrtaceae
- Genus: Syzygium
- Species: S. unipunctatum

Binomial name
- Syzygium unipunctatum (B.Hyland) Craven, Biffin & Ashton

Synonyms
- Waterhousea unipunctata B.Hyland

= Syzygium unipunctatum =

Rolypoly satinash

Species of flowering plant

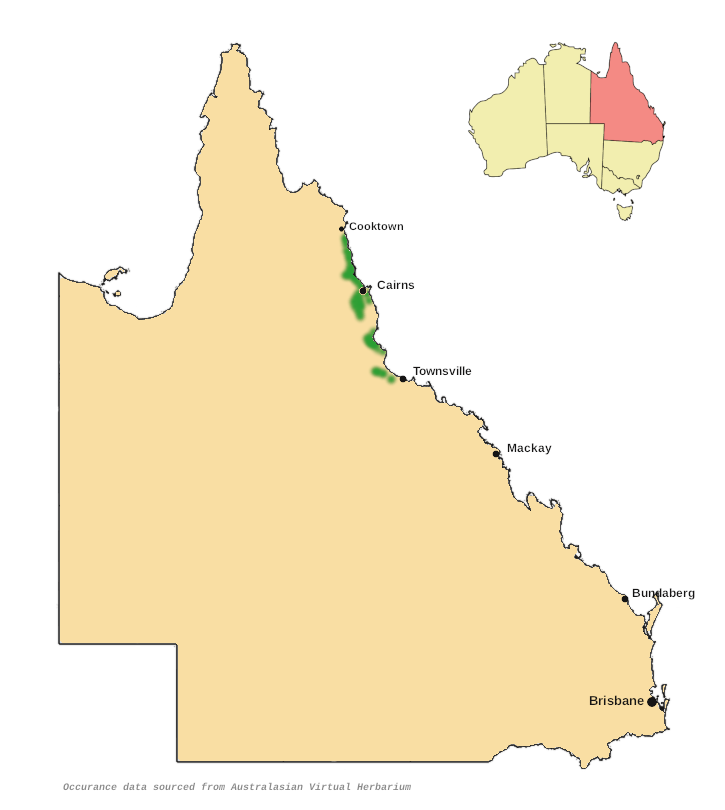
Distribution of Syzygium unipunctatum

Syzygium unipunctatum, commonly known as the rolypoly satinash, is a small tree in the family Myrtaceae. It is endemic to the rainforests of the Wet Tropics of Queensland.

== Description ==
Syzygium unipunctatum is a small evergreen tree growing up to about 20 m (66 ft) tall. The leaves are elliptic to ovate and are arranged in opposite pairs on the twigs. New growth is pink or red while mature leaves are glossy green. The leaves have wavy edges and they measure up to 12 cm (4.7 in) long by 5 cm (2.0 in) wide. Intramarginal veins (i.e. veins that parallel, and are close to, the leaf margins or edges) are present, about 2 mm (0.08 in) from the margin; the secondary veins are numerous and straight; tertiary venation is reticulate.

The inflorescence is a panicle produced either terminally or from the leaf axils, and the white/cream flowers are small with 4 or 5 petals. The fruit is a pink, blue or purple berry measuring up to 12 mm (0.47 in) long by 15 mm (0.59 in) wide. It has a number of longitudinal grooves on the surface, giving it the appearance of a miniature pumpkin.

== Taxonomy ==
In 1983 the noted Australian botanist Bernard (Bernie) Hyland published a review of the genus Syzygium, in which he created a new genus – Waterhousea – to accommodate four new taxa, one of them being W. unipunctata. Hyland's description of this new species was based on plant material collected by V.K. Moriaty near Mossman in 1945. His paper was titled "A Revision of Syzygium and Allied Genera (Myrtaceae) in Australia," and was published in the Australian Journal of Botany in 1983.

Just over 20 years later, in 2006, another major review of Syzygium and closely related genera was published by Lyndley Craven, Edward Sturt Biffin and Peter Shaw Ashton, with the result that Waterhousea was transferred to Syzygium (along with Acmena, Acmenosperma, Cleistocalyx and Piliocalyx), and this taxon was given the new combination Syzygium unipunctatum.

=== Etymology ===
The genus name Syzygium comes from the Ancient Greek sýzygos, meaning 'joined', 'yoked', or 'paired', and refers to the paired leaves. The species epithet unipunctatum is derived from the Latin words unus, meaning 'one' or 'single', and punctum, meaning 'spot' or 'dot', a reference to the fact that there is usually only one oil dot within each reticulation of the tertiary veins.

== Distribution and habitat ==
The range of Syzygium punctatum is restricted to coastal northeast Queensland from near Cooktown south to about Townsville. It grows as an understory tree in rainforest on a variety of soil types, and is widespread within the range. The altitudinal range is from sea level to about 1,200 m (3,900 ft).

== Conservation ==
This species is listed by the Queensland Department of Environment and Science as least concern. As of 5 December 2023, it has not been assessed by the IUCN.

== Cultivation and uses ==
The rolypoly satinash is becoming popular as a cultivated plant due to its colourful flushes of new growth and its unusual fruit. It does not grow large enough to produce useful timber.

== Gallery ==
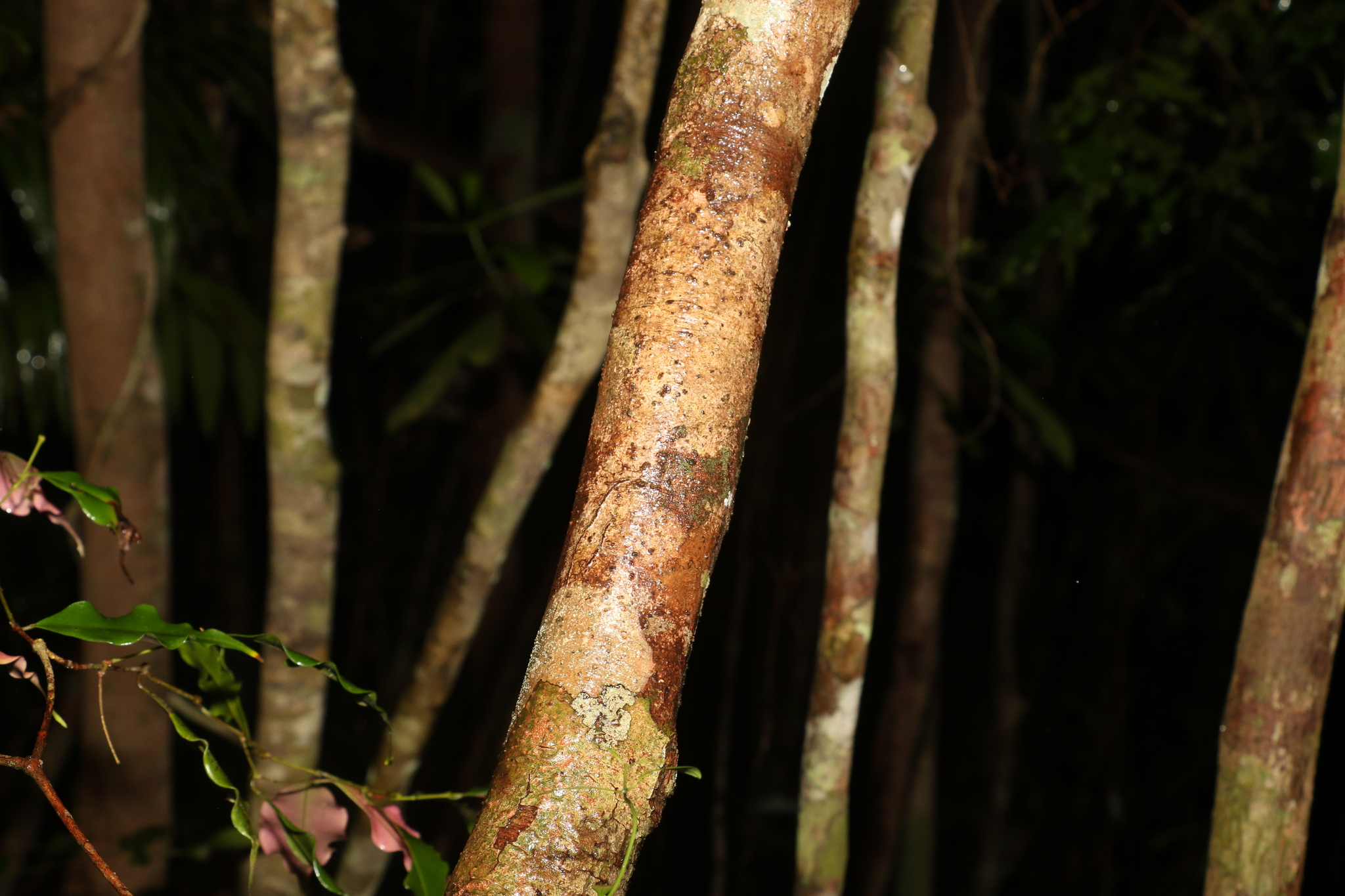
Trunk

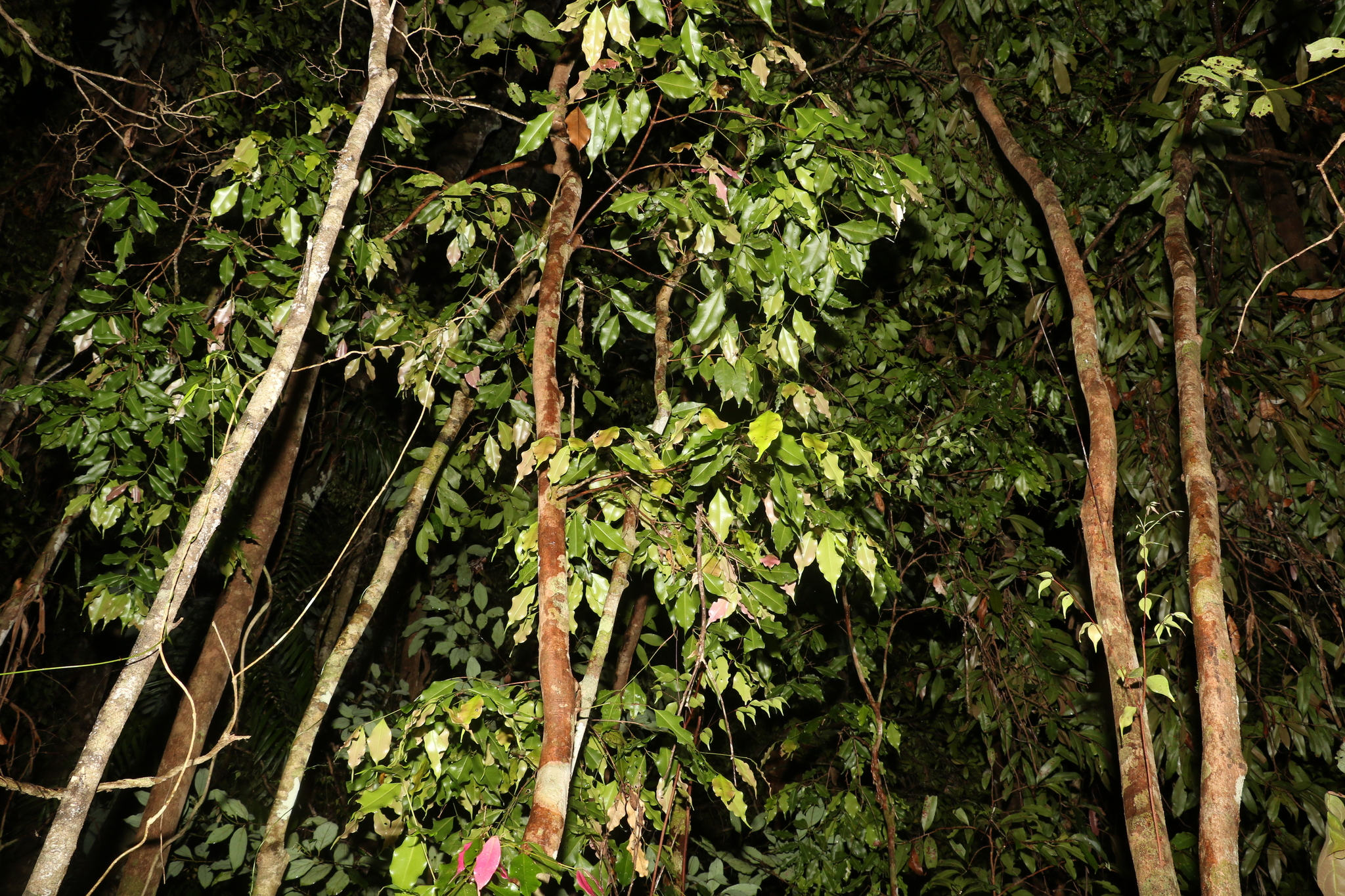
Habit

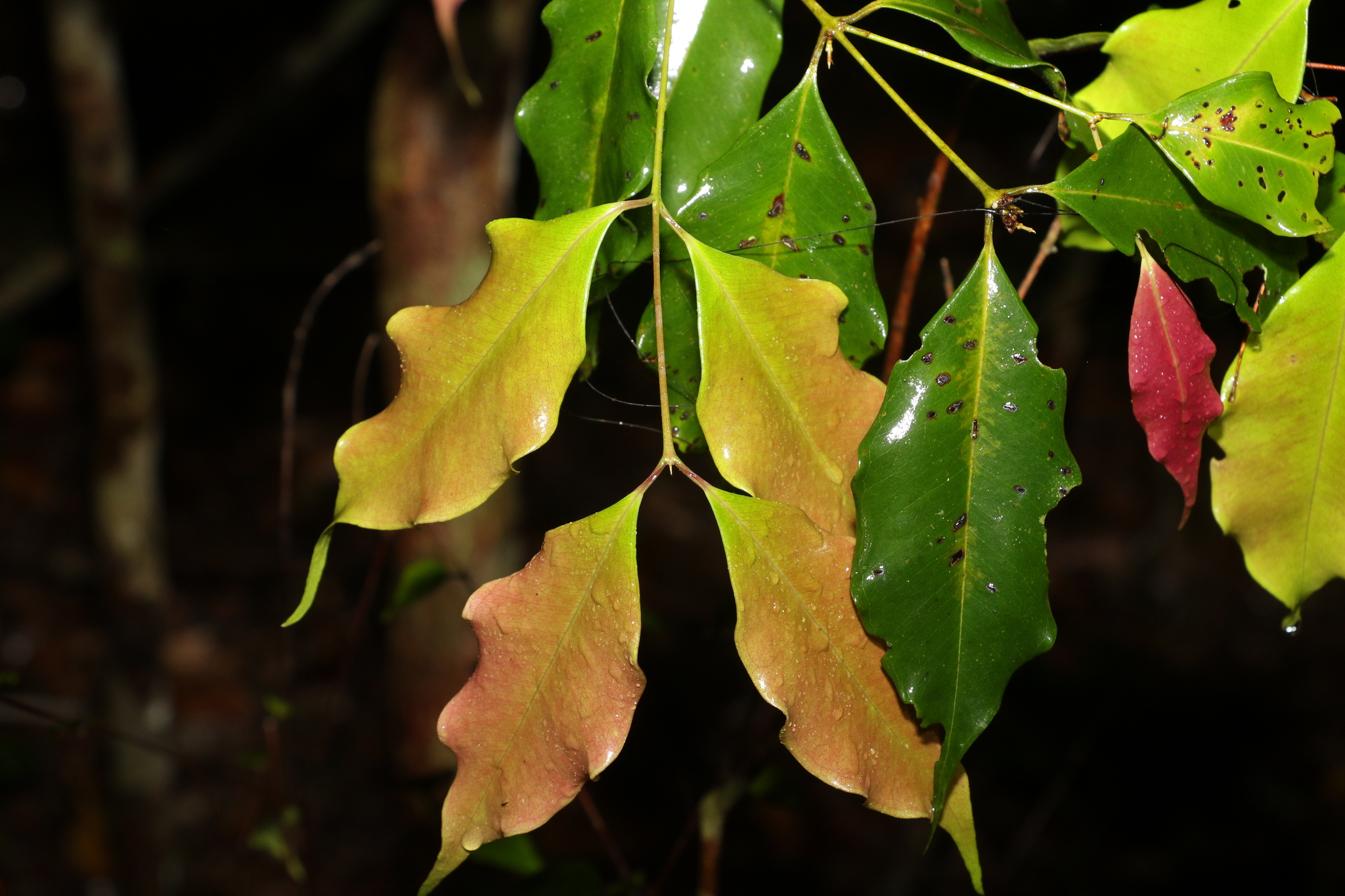
Foliage
