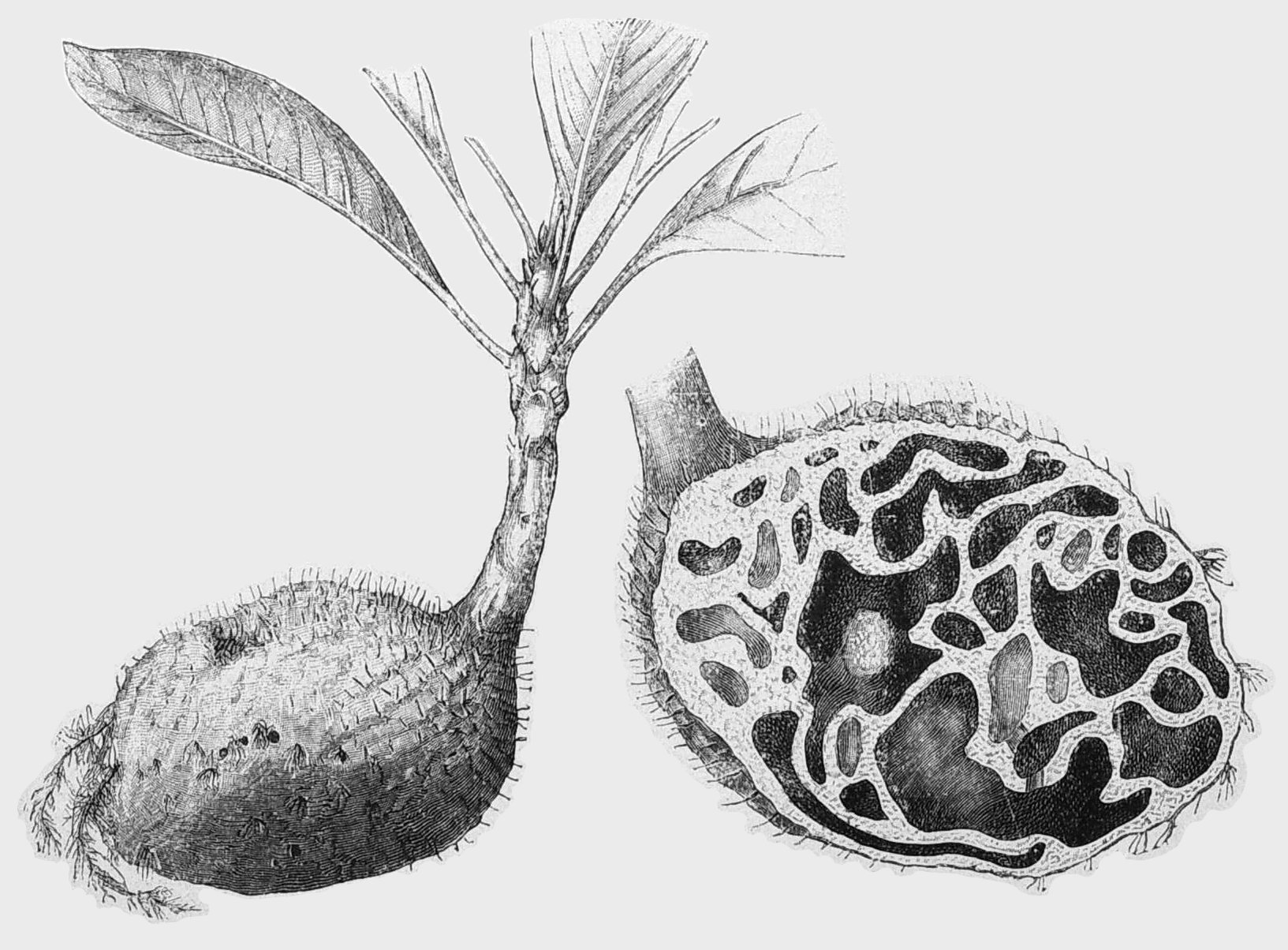
- 1897 diagram of Myrmecodia platytyrea

Scientific classification
- Kingdom: Plantae
- Clade: Tracheophytes
- Clade: Angiosperms
- Clade: Eudicots
- Clade: Asterids
- Order: Gentianales
- Family: Rubiaceae
- Subfamily: Rubioideae
- Tribe: Psychotrieae
- Genus: Hydnophytum; Jack

Species
- See text

Synonyms
- Lasiostoma Benth.

= Hydnophytum =

Genus of epiphytes

Hydnophytum is a genus of epiphytic myrmecophytes (ant plants) native to Southeast Asia, the Pacific region and also extending into Queensland in northern Australia. The name is derived from the Ancient Greek hydnon "tuber", and phyton "plant", after their appearance with their swollen succulent stems. The species grow in tree branches and on trunks. Like the related genus Myrmecodia, they are known as antplants or ant-house plants. The type species is Hydnophytum formicarum from the Philippines. The genus contains 55 species, of which 44 are found in and around the island of New Guinea. Many are poorly known, with 11 known only from the holotype.

They form a symbiotic relationship with ants. Ant plants provide habitats for ant colonies high up into the forest canopy, protecting them from the elements and also predators because of the spines. Hollow, smooth-walled tunnels form within the caudex with external entrance holes, providing an above-ground home for ant colonies. Ants likewise provide defense for the plant and prevent tissue damage, swarming to defend their home if disturbed. Ant colonies also provide nutrients to the plants by leaving wastes within the tunnels inside the caudex. Special glands lining the tunnels then absorb nutriment for the plant. This symbiosis allows the plants to effectively gather nutrients (via the ants) from a much larger area than the roots ever could cover.

These plants can be grown in cultivation without the ant species being present. Two species seen occasionally in cultivation are Hydnophytum ferrugineum from the McIlwraith Range east of Coen on Cape York Peninsula, and H. moseleyanum, also from Cape York. The former has a spiny swollen trunk while the latter has a smooth one.

Hydnophytum is one of five ant-plant genera in the family Rubiaceae, the others being Anthorrhiza, Myrmecodia, Myrmephytum, and Squamellaria.

== Species ==
As of 11 May 2024, Plants of the World Online recognises 57 species, as follows:

- Hydnophytum acuminicalyx Jebb & C.R.Huxley
- Hydnophytum albertisii Becc.
- Hydnophytum alboviride Merr. & L.M.Perry
- Hydnophytum angustifolium Merr.
- Hydnophytum archboldianum Merr. & L.M.Perry
- Hydnophytum bracteatum Valeton
- Hydnophytum buxifolium Merr. & L.M.Perry
- Hydnophytum caminiferum Wistuba, U.Zimm., Gronem. & Marwinski
- Hydnophytum confertifolium Merr. & L.M.Perry
- Hydnophytum cordifolium Valeton
- Hydnophytum dauloense Jebb & C.R.Huxley
- Hydnophytum davisii Jebb & C.R.Huxley
- Hydnophytum decipiens Merr. & L.M.Perry
- Hydnophytum dentrecastense Jebb & C.R.Huxley
- Hydnophytum ellipticum Merr. & L.M.Perry
- Hydnophytum ferrugineum P.I.Forst.
- Hydnophytum formicarum Jack
- Hydnophytum fusiforme Jebb & C.R.Huxley
- Hydnophytum grandiflorum Becc.
- Hydnophytum grandifolium Valeton
- Hydnophytum hailans Jebb & C.R.Huxley
- Hydnophytum hellwigii Warb.
- Hydnophytum heterophyllum Merr. & L.M.Perry
- Hydnophytum kebarense Jebb & C.R.Huxley
- Hydnophytum lauterbachii Valeton
- Hydnophytum linearifolium Valeton
- Hydnophytum longiflorum A.Gray
- Hydnophytum lucidulum Valeton
- Hydnophytum magnifolium Merr. & L.M.Perry
- Hydnophytum magnirubrum Jebb & C.R.Huxley
- Hydnophytum mamberamoense Jebb & C.R.Huxley
- Hydnophytum mayuense Jebb & C.R.Huxley
- Hydnophytum microphyllum Becc.
- Hydnophytum minirubrum Jebb & C.R.Huxley
- Hydnophytum morotaiense Jebb & C.R.Huxley
- Hydnophytum moseleyanum Becc.
- Hydnophytum multituberosum Jebb & C.R.Huxley
- Hydnophytum myrtifolium Merr. & L.M.Perry
- Hydnophytum orichalcum Jebb & C.R.Huxley
- Hydnophytum ovatum Miq.
- Hydnophytum pauper Valeton ex Jebb & C.R.Huxley
- Hydnophytum petiolatum Becc.
- Hydnophytum puffii Y.W.Low, Sugau & K.M.Wong
- Hydnophytum radicans Becc.
- Hydnophytum ramispinum Merr. & L.M.Perry
- Hydnophytum reevii Jebb & C.R.Huxley
- Hydnophytum spathulatum Valeton
- Hydnophytum stenophyllum Valeton
- Hydnophytum subsessile Valeton
- Hydnophytum terrestris Jebb & C.R.Huxley
- Hydnophytum tetrapterum Becc.
- Hydnophytum tortuosum Becc.
- Hydnophytum trichomanes Jebb & C.R.Huxley
- Hydnophytum valetonii Jebb & C.R.Huxley
- Hydnophytum virgatum Valeton
- Hydnophytum vitis-idaea Merr. & L.M.Perry
- Hydnophytum zippelianum Becc.
