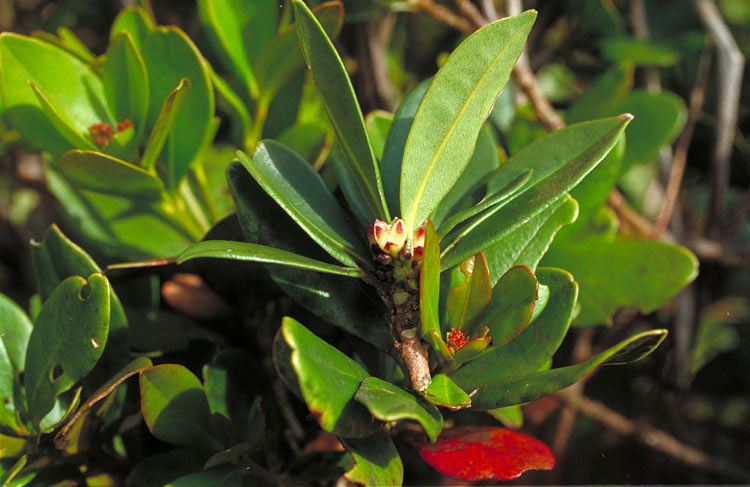

Scientific classification
- Kingdom: Plantae
- Clade: Tracheophytes
- Clade: Angiosperms
- Clade: Eudicots
- Clade: Rosids
- Order: Sapindales
- Family: Rutaceae
- Genus: Medicosma
- Species: M. glandulosa

Binomial name
- Medicosma glandulosa T.G.Hartley

= Medicosma glandulosa =

Species of shrub

Medicosma glandulosa is a species of shrub or small tree in the family Rutaceae and is endemic to far north Queensland. It has elliptical to egg-shaped leaves and flowers that are white with red tips or cream-coloured, borne singly or in small groups in leaf axils.

== Description ==
Medicosma glandulosa is a tree that typically grows to a height of 10 mm (0.39 in). The leaves are arranged in opposite pairs or in whorls of three or four and are elliptical to narrow egg-shaped with the narrower end towards the base, 23–120 mm (0.91–4.72 in) long and 10–40 mm (0.39–1.57 in) wide on a petiole 3–10 mm (0.12–0.39 in) long. The flowers are arranged singly or in small groups up to 7 mm (0.28 in) long and are sessile or on a pedicel up to 1.5 mm (0.059 in) long. The sepals are 1.5–2 mm (0.059–0.079 in) long and glabrous and the petals are white with red tips or cream-coloured, 2.5–3.5 mm (0.098–0.138 in) long and glabrous apart from a few hairs on the tip of the lower surface. Flowering occurs in most months and the fruit is a follicle 4–5 mm (0.16–0.20 in) long.

== Taxonomy ==
Medicosma glandulosa was first formally described in 1985 by Thomas Gordon Hartley in the Australian Journal of Botany from specimens collected by Bernard Hyland in 1975 in the Carbine logging area.

== Distribution and habitat ==
This medicosma grows as an understorey tree in mountain rainforest at altitudes between 1,000 and 1,200 m (3,300 and 3,900 ft). It occurs from Mount Finnigan in the Cedar Bay National Park to near Mount Lewis in far north Queensland.

== Conservation status ==
This species is classified as of "least concern" under the Queensland Government Nature Conservation Act 1992.
