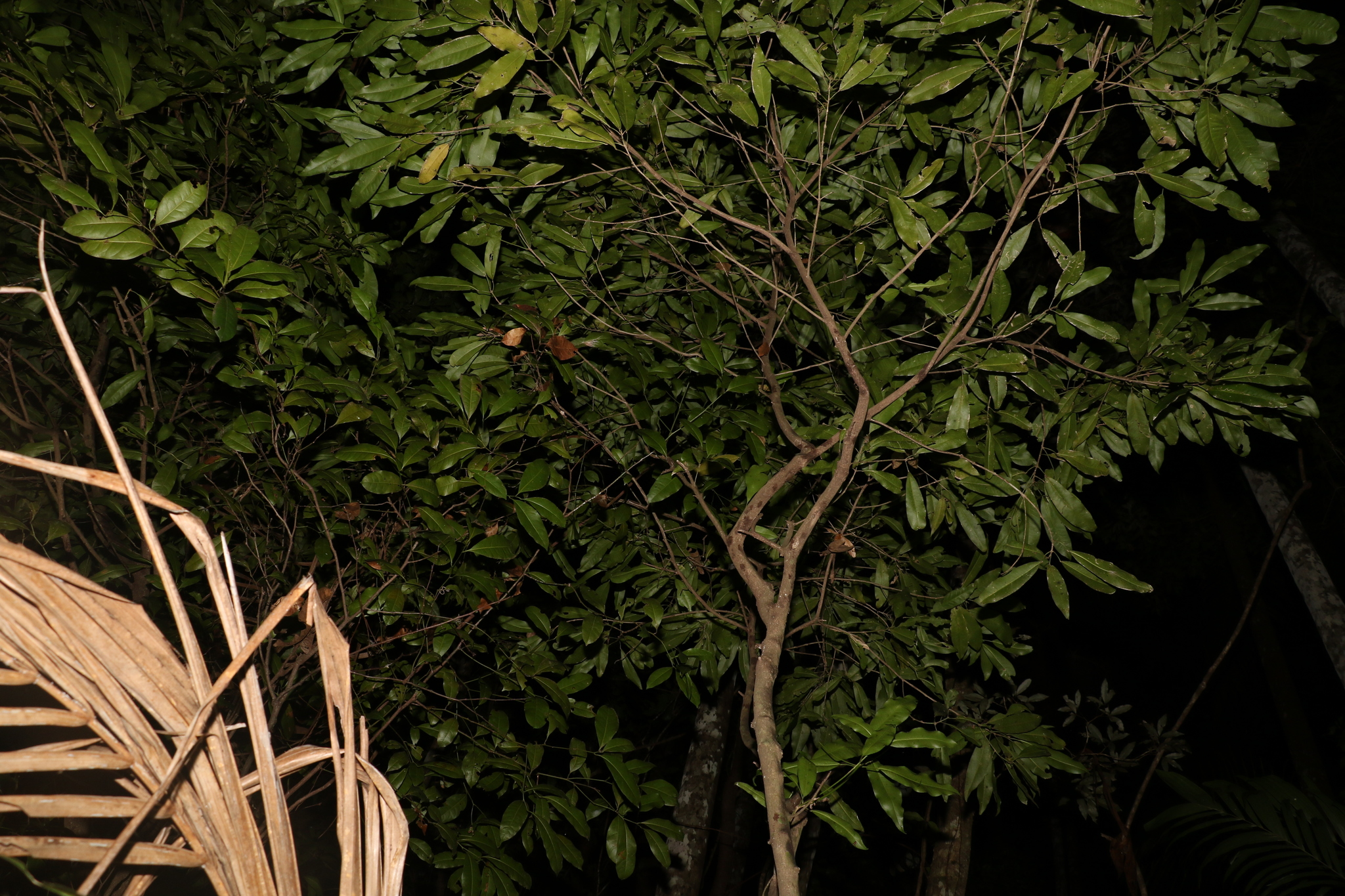

Scientific classification
- Kingdom: Plantae
- Clade: Tracheophytes
- Clade: Angiosperms
- Clade: Eudicots
- Clade: Rosids
- Order: Sapindales
- Family: Rutaceae
- Genus: Medicosma
- Species: M. forsteri

Binomial name
- Medicosma forsteri T.G.Hartley

= Medicosma forsteri =

Species of tree

Medicosma forsteri is a species of small tree in the family Rutaceae and is endemic to a restricted area of Queensland. It has elliptical leaves and cream-coloured flowers borne singly or in small groups in leaf axils.

== Description ==
Medicosma forsteri is a tree that typically grows to a height of 12 mm (0.47 in). The leaves are arranged in more or less opposite pairs and are narrow elliptical to narrow egg-shaped with the narrower end towards the base, 60–140 mm (2.4–5.5 in) long and 17–45 mm (0.67–1.77 in) wide on a petiole 5–25 mm (0.20–0.98 in) long. The flowers are arranged singly or in small groups up to 20 mm (0.79 in) long and are sessile or on a pedicel up to 2 mm (0.079 in) long. The sepals are 1.5–2 mm (0.059–0.079 in) long and densely covered on the outside with soft hairs flattened against the surface. The petals are cream-coloured, about 5 mm (0.20 in) long, densely covered with flattened hairs on the back and part of the front. The remnants of the petals remain on the fruit, increasing in size to about 6.5 mm (0.26 in). Flowering has been observed in April and the fruit is a follicle about 6.5 mm (0.26 in) long.

== Taxonomy ==
Medicosma forsteri was first formally described in 1985 by Thomas Gordon Hartley in the Australian Journal of Botany from specimens collected in 2000 near Mount Mellum by Paul Irwin Forster. The specific epithet honours the collector of the type specimens.

== Distribution and habitat ==
This medicosma is only known from the type location where it grows at an altitude of 220 m (720 ft) in rainforest dominated by bangalow palm (Archontophoenix cunninghamiana).

== Conservation status ==
This species is classified as of "least concern" under the Queensland Government Nature Conservation Act 1992.
