= Acacia forsteri =

Conservation status
- Critically endangered (EPBC Act)

Scientific classification
- Kingdom: Plantae
- Clade: Tracheophytes
- Clade: Angiosperms
- Clade: Eudicots
- Clade: Rosids
- Order: Fabales
- Family: Fabaceae
- Subfamily: Caesalpinioideae
- Clade: Mimosoid clade
- Genus: Acacia
- Species: A. forsteri

Binomial name
- Acacia forsteri Pedley

Species of shrub

Acacia forsteri, commonly known as Forster's wattle, is a species of flowering plant in the family Fabaceae and is endemic to a restricted area of south-eastern Queensland, Australia. It is a spreading shrub with narrowly elliptic to narrowly lance-shaped phyllodes with the narrower end towards the base, spherical heads of pale yellow flowers and oblong, leathery, glabrous pods.

== Description ==
Acacia forsteri is a spreading shrub that typically grows to a height of up to 3 m (9.8 ft), maturing trees to 5 m (16 ft) high. Its branchlets are glabrous with brownish young tips. The phyllodes are narrowly elliptic to narrowly lance-shaped with the narrower end towards the base, 40–50 mm (1.6–2.0 in) long, 6.5–9 mm (0.26–0.35 in) wide and glabrous, with a gland 19–16 mm (0.75–0.63 in) long above the base of the pulvinus. The flowers are borne in spherical heads in racemes 10–40 mm (0.39–1.57 in) long, the heads on a peduncles 4–6 mm (0.16–0.24 in) long with 10 to 15 pale yellow flowers. Flowering appears to commence in late June, and the pods are oblong, straight or slightly curved, 35–60 mm (1.4–2.4 in) long, 14–24 mm (0.55–0.94 in) wide, leathery and covered with a powdery bloom.

== Taxonomy ==
Acacia forsteri was first formally described in 2019 by Leslie Pedley in the journal Austrobaileya from specimens collected by Paul Irwin Forster, 9 km (5.6 mi) west-south-west of Gayndah in 2000. The specific epithet (forsteri) honours the collector of the type specimens, and a friend and colleague of the author Pedley.

== Distribution and habitat ==
This species of wattle is only known from the type collection where it grows in woodland near Gayndah in south-eastern Queensland.

== Conservation status ==
Acacia forsteri is listed as "critically endangered" under the Australian Government Environment Protection and Biodiversity Conservation Act 1999 and the Queensland Government Nature Conservation Act 1992.

== See also ==
- List of Acacia species
