= Medicosma obovata =

Conservation status
- Vulnerable (EPBC Act)

Scientific classification
- Kingdom: Plantae
- Clade: Tracheophytes
- Clade: Angiosperms
- Clade: Eudicots
- Clade: Rosids
- Order: Sapindales
- Family: Rutaceae
- Genus: Medicosma
- Species: M. obovata

Binomial name
- Medicosma obovata T.G.Hartley

Species of shrub

Medicosma obovata is a species of shrub or small tree in the family Rutaceae and is endemic to a restricted area of far north Queensland. It has simple egg-shaped leaves with the narrower end towards the base and white flowers borne singly or in small groups in leaf axils.

== Description ==
Medicosma obovata is a shrub or tree that typically grows to a height of 6 mm (0.24 in) and has glabrous leaves and branchlets. The leaves are egg-shaped with the narrower end towards the base, 45–105 mm (1.8–4.1 in) long and 25–60 mm (0.98–2.36 in) wide on a petiole 5–12 mm (0.20–0.47 in) long. The flowers are arranged singly or in small groups up to 13 mm (0.51 in) long, each flower sessile or on a pedicel up to 1 mm (0.039 in) long. The sepals are about 2 mm (0.079 in) long and more or less glabrous. The petals are white, 4.5–7 mm (0.18–0.28 in) long, densely covered on the back with soft hairs flattened against the surface and the eight stamens alternate in length. Flowering occurs from April to July and the fruit is a follicle 6.5–7 mm (0.26–0.28 in) long.

== Taxonomy ==
Medicosma obovata was first formally described in 1985 by Thomas Gordon Hartley in the Australian Journal of Botany from specimens collected on Mount Dryander in 1967.

== Distribution and habitat ==
This medicosma grows in rainforest and cloud forest at an altitude of 820 m (2,690 ft) and is only known from the type location and nearby foothills.

== Conservation status ==
This species is classified as "vulnerable" under the Australian Government Environment Protection and Biodiversity Conservation Act 1999 and the Queensland Government Nature Conservation Act 1992.
