= Medicosma elliptica =

Bulburin medicosma

Conservation status
- Vulnerable (EPBC Act)

Scientific classification
- Kingdom: Plantae
- Clade: Tracheophytes
- Clade: Angiosperms
- Clade: Eudicots
- Clade: Rosids
- Order: Sapindales
- Family: Rutaceae
- Genus: Medicosma
- Species: M. elliptica

Binomial name
- Medicosma elliptica T.G.Hartley

Species of shrub

Medicosma elliptica, commonly known as Bulburin medicosma, is a species of shrub or small tree in the family Rutaceae and is endemic to a restricted area of Queensland. It has elliptical leaves and white flowers borne singly or in small groups in leaf axils.

== Description ==
Medicosma elliptica is a shrub or tree that typically grows to a height of 7 mm (0.28 in) with glabrous branchlets. The leaves are arranged in opposite pairs, leathery, elliptical or oval, 45–125 mm (1.8–4.9 in) long and 18–60 mm (0.71–2.36 in) wide on a petiole 4–10 mm (0.16–0.39 in) long. The leaves are glabrous and have many conspicuous oil dots. The flowers are arranged singly or in small groups in leaf axils and are sessile or on a pedicel up to 1 mm (0.039 in) long. The sepals are about 2 mm (0.079 in) long and covered on the outside with soft hairs flattened against the surface. The petals are white, 4.5–5.5 mm (0.18–0.22 in) long, densely covered with flattened hairs on the back, and remain on the fruit. Flowering has been observed in April and July and the fruit is a glabrous, wrinkled follicle 7–9 mm (0.28–0.35 in) long.

== Taxonomy ==
Medicosma elliptica was first formally described in 1985 by Thomas Gordon Hartley in the Australian Journal of Botany from specimens collected in the Bulburin State Forest in 1978.

== Distribution and habitat ==
Bulburin medicosma grows in mountainous terrain on steep, rocky hillsides in vine forest with hoop pine (Araucaria cunninghamii), brush box (Lophostemon confertus) and Moreton Bay fig (Ficus macrophylla), in an area previously logged for hoop pine. It is found in the Many Peaks and Dawes Ranges in east-central Queensland.

== Conservation status ==
This species is classified as "vulnerable" under the Australian Government Environment Protection and Biodiversity Conservation Act 1999 and the Queensland Government Nature Conservation Act 1992. The main threats to the species are inappropriate fire regimes and invasion by the exotic weed Lantana camara, partly caused by disturbance caused by earlier logging of hoop pine.
