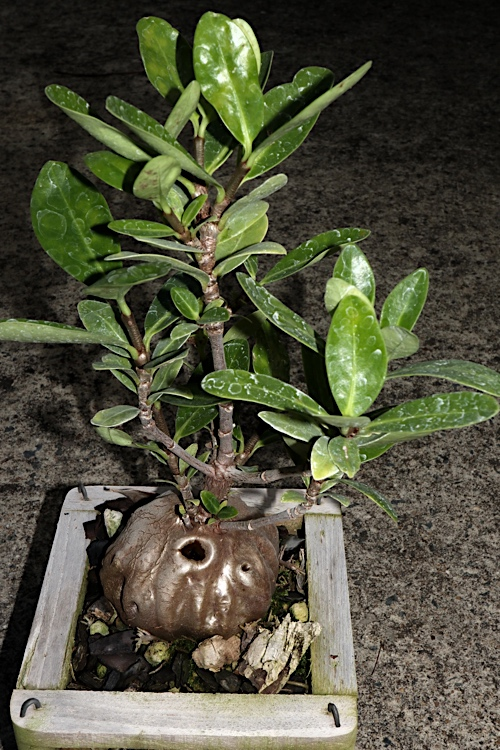

Scientific classification
- Kingdom: Plantae
- Clade: Tracheophytes
- Clade: Angiosperms
- Clade: Eudicots
- Clade: Asterids
- Order: Gentianales
- Family: Rubiaceae
- Genus: Hydnophytum
- Species: H. ferrugineum

Binomial name
- Hydnophytum ferrugineum P.I.Forst.

= Hydnophytum ferrugineum =

Species of flowering plant

Hydnophytum ferrugineum is a epiphyte species of myrmecophytes native to the Cape York Peninsula, Queensland, Australia. It forms a mutualistic relationship with ants on tree branches in the tropics. It is distinctive due to the presence of rust-colored hairs covering the bracts near the inflorescences. H. ferrugineum was first described by Paul Irwin Forster in 2001, given its specific epithet ferrugineum due to the rust-colored hairs located on the bracts.

== Description ==
H.ferrugineum is a subshrub in the genus Hydnophytum, one of two genera of "ant plants" or "ant house plants". It is a member of the family Rubiaceae of angiosperms.

H.ferrugineum can grow to be 30 cm (12 in) in diameter and 60 cm (24 in) in height. It has mesomorphic palmately veined glossy leaves arranged oppositely on the stem. The stems are often singular and glabrous. H. ferrugineum has bisexual white flowers with four sympetalous petals in inflorescences at leaf axils. A distinguishing characteristic of this species is long (up to 2 mm (0.079 in)) ferruginous trichomes on the bracts from the inflorescences. Four anthers are present inside the flower's corolla, densely surrounded by trichomes.

== Habitat ==
H.ferrugineum is an epiphyte that lives primarily in moist tropical locations with moderate sun. As an epiphyte, it grows on other plants but is not parasitic. Although this species faces little threat, human collecting of ant plants can damage local populations. Collecting is common due to rare Orchidaceae species endemic to the region, leading many people to take samples of H. ferrugineum as well as other ant plants.

== Ecology ==
Like other species in Hydnophytum, it forms a mutualistic relationship with ants. H. ferrugineum produces a large complex tuber known as a caudex that contains openings and tunnels throughout. This provides a habitat for ants above the ground and allows them to live in otherwise hostile habitats. In addition to the caudex providing ant habitat, many species of Hydnophytum use external nectaries to provide ants with a food source. The ants that inhabit the caudex scavenge food from a wide area and produce waste inside the caudex that then fertilizes the plant. Ants can help spread pollen or seeds across a wide area. This allows H. ferrugineum to draw resources from a much larger area than would be possible with a root system.

== Distribution ==
H.ferrugineum is found on the Cape York peninsula. Cape York has a warm tropical climate throughout the year, providing a warm and wet environment for plants. Although it is only naturally found in this portion of Australia, it has become an increasingly popular houseplant in recent years, often marketed as simply an ant plant or maze plant.

== Phylogeny ==
H.ferrugineum is a generalist, forming mutualistic relationships with many different ant species. This trait likely developed between 15 and 20 million years ago during the Miocene epoch. Other species (such as some in Hydnophytum or Macaranga) descending from this ancestor later developed specific mutualistic relationships, allowing only one ant species to live inside the caudex by modifying the size of the openings. Others expanded instead, supporting other small animals such as frogs and lizards.
