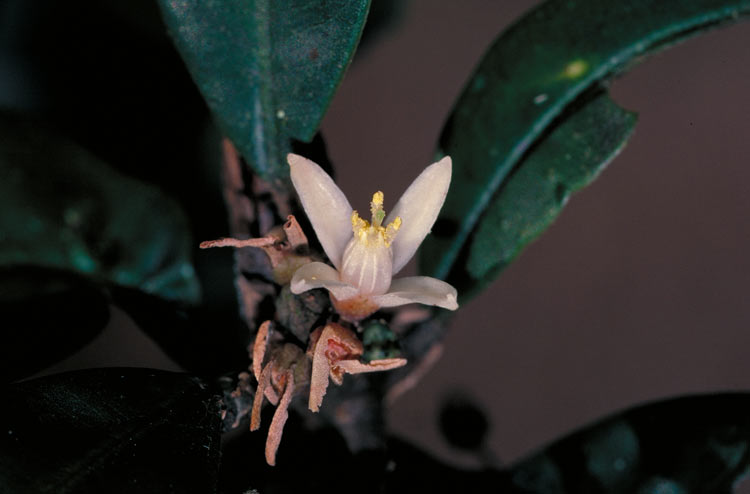

Conservation status
- Vulnerable (EPBC Act)

Scientific classification
- Kingdom: Plantae
- Clade: Tracheophytes
- Clade: Angiosperms
- Clade: Eudicots
- Clade: Rosids
- Order: Sapindales
- Family: Rutaceae
- Genus: Medicosma
- Species: M. sessiliflora

Binomial name
- Medicosma sessiliflora (C.T.White) T.G.Hartley

Synonyms
- Melicope sessiliflora C.T.White

= Medicosma sessiliflora =

Species of shrub

Medicosma sessiliflora is a species of shrub or small tree in the family Rutaceae and is endemic to far north Queensland. It has simple elliptical to egg-shaped leaves with the narrower end towards the base and cream-coloured flowers borne singly or in small groups in leaf axils.

== Description ==
Medicosma sessiliflora is a shrub or tree that typically grows to a height of 10 mm (0.39 in). The leaves are elliptical to egg-shaped with the narrower end towards the base, 55–225 mm (2.2–8.9 in) long and 20–85 mm (0.79–3.35 in) wide on a petiole 5–45 mm (0.20–1.77 in) long. The flowers are arranged singly or in small groups up to 12 mm (0.47 in) long, each flower sessile or on a pedicel up to 1 mm (0.039 in) long. The sepals are 1–2 mm (0.039–0.079 in) long and the petals are cream-coloured, 5–7 mm (0.20–0.28 in) long, densely covered on the back with soft hairs flattened against the surface and the eight stamens alternate in length. Flowering occurs from May to November and the fruit is a follicle 5–10 mm (0.20–0.39 in) long.

== Taxonomy ==
This species was first formally described in 1936 by Cyril Tenison White who gave it the name Melicope sessiliflora and published the description in the Proceedings of the Royal Society of Queensland from specimens collected by Leonard John Brass in the Mossman Gorge. In 1985 Thomas Gordon Hartley changed the name to Medicosma sessiliflora in the Australian Journal of Botany.

== Distribution and habitat ==
Medicosma sessiliflora grows in rainforest from sea level to an altitude of 750 m (2,460 ft) and is found from near Cooktown to the Atherton Tableland in far north Queensland.

== Conservation status ==
This species is classified as of "least concern" under the Queensland Government Nature Conservation Act 1992.
