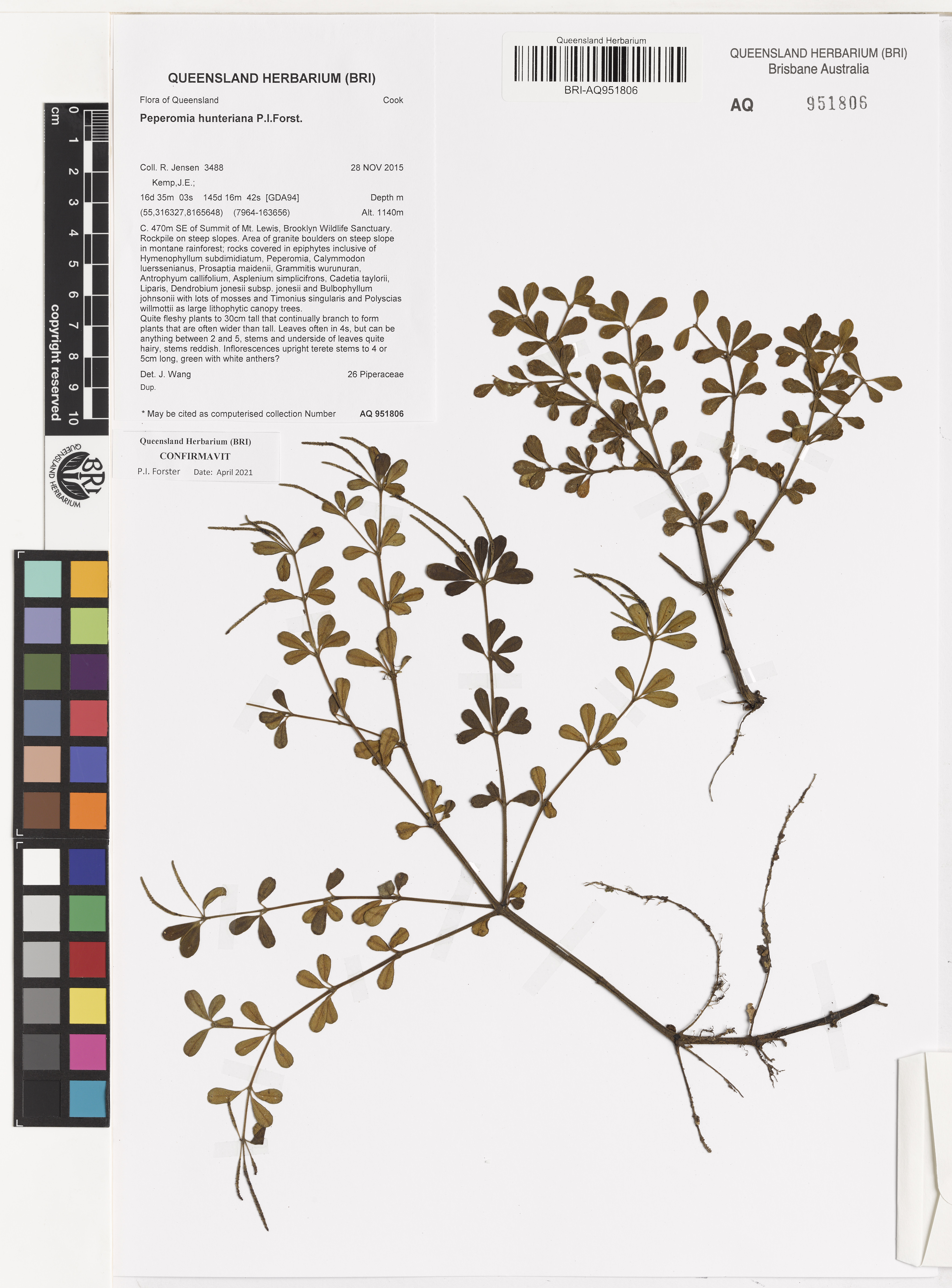
- Herberium specimen

Conservation status
- Least Concern (NCA)

Scientific classification
- Kingdom: Plantae
- Clade: Tracheophytes
- Clade: Angiosperms
- Clade: Magnoliids
- Order: Piperales
- Family: Piperaceae
- Genus: Peperomia
- Species: P. hunteriana

Binomial name
- Peperomia hunteriana P.I.Forst.

= Peperomia hunteriana =

Species of flowering plant

Peperomia hunteriana is a plant in the pepper family Piperaceae found only in the Wet Tropics bioregion of Queensland, Australia.

== Description ==
Peperomia hunteriana is a small, succulent, erect herb growing up to 10 cm (3.9 in) tall with a dense covering of reddish hairs on the stems. The leaves are usually presented in whorls of three, or rarely four. The leaf blades are also densely hairy and are held on petioles about 2 mm (0.08 in) long. Leaf shape is obovate to rounded and the secondary venation is obscure. They may reach up to 26 mm (1.02 in) long by 14 mm (0.55 in) wide.

The inflorescence is a spike up to 5 cm (2.0 in) long, which may or may not be branched.

== Taxonomy ==
This species was first described by the Australian botanist Paul Irwin Forster, based on material collected from Mount Bartle Frere by Forster in 1997. Forster's paper describing the new species was published in 1999 in Austrobaileya, the journal of the Queensland Herbarium.

=== Etymology ===
The species epithet hunteriana was chosen by Forster in recognition of John Hunter from Coffs Harbour, New South Wales, who first collected specimens of this species.

== Distribution and habitat ==
The native range of this species is restricted to a small part of northeastern Queensland, Australia, from the highland areas of the Daintree National Park immediately west of Mossman, southwards to Mount Bartle Frere. It grows on rocky outcrops close to, or within, rainforest at altitudes from about 1,100 m (3,600 ft) up to 1,520 m (4,990 ft)

== Conservation ==
This species is listed by the Queensland Government's Department of Environment, Science and Innovation as least concern. As of 14 April 2024, it has not been assessed by the International Union for Conservation of Nature (IUCN).

== Gallery ==
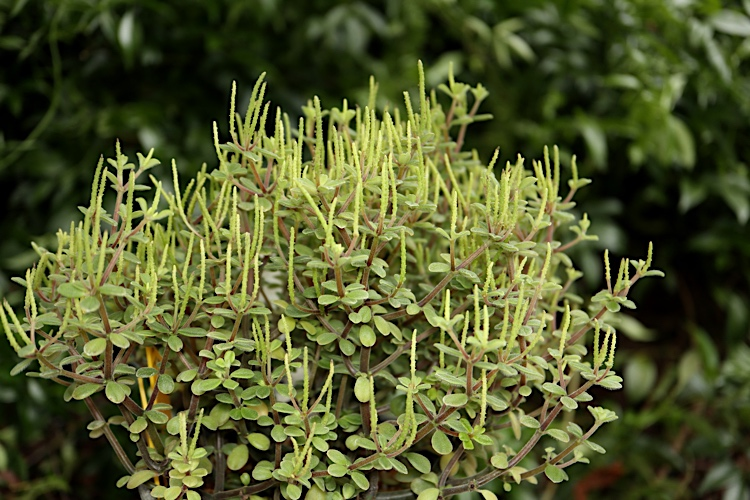

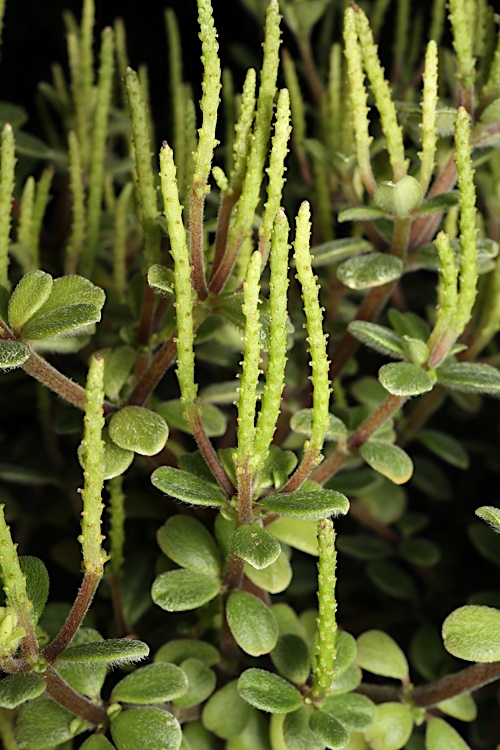

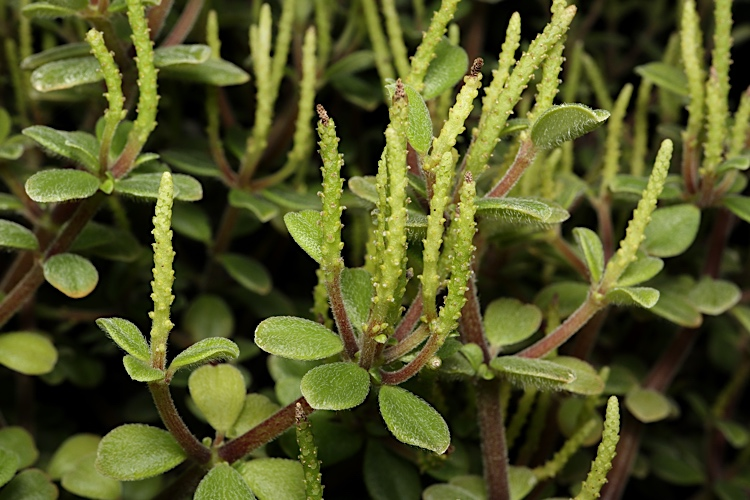
