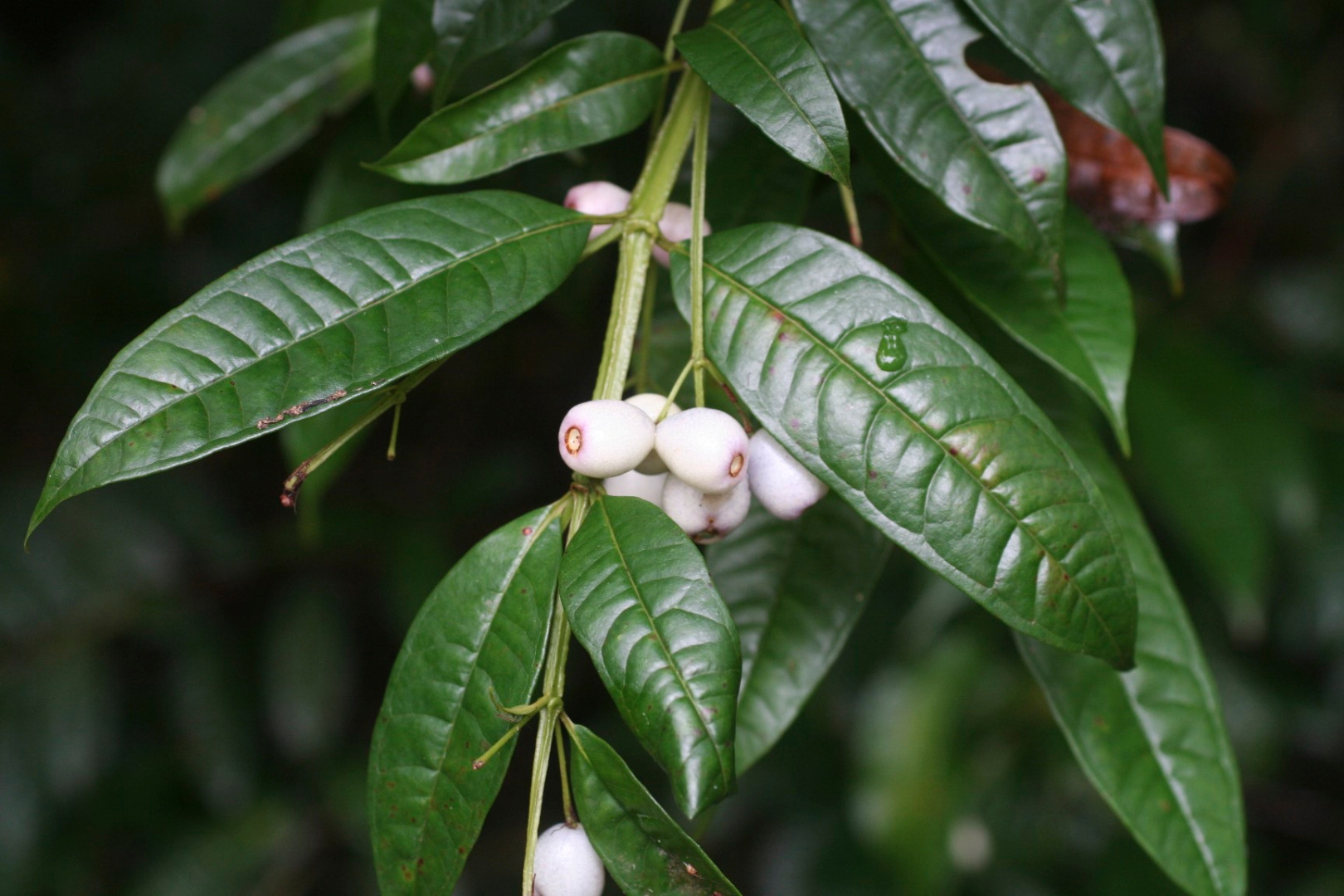
- Foliage and fruit

Conservation status
- Least Concern (NCA)

Scientific classification
- Kingdom: Plantae
- Clade: Tracheophytes
- Clade: Angiosperms
- Clade: Eudicots
- Clade: Rosids
- Order: Myrtales
- Family: Myrtaceae
- Genus: Syzygium
- Species: S. alatoramulum

Binomial name
- Syzygium alatoramulum B.Hyland

= Syzygium alatoramulum =

Tinkling satinash

Species of flowering plant

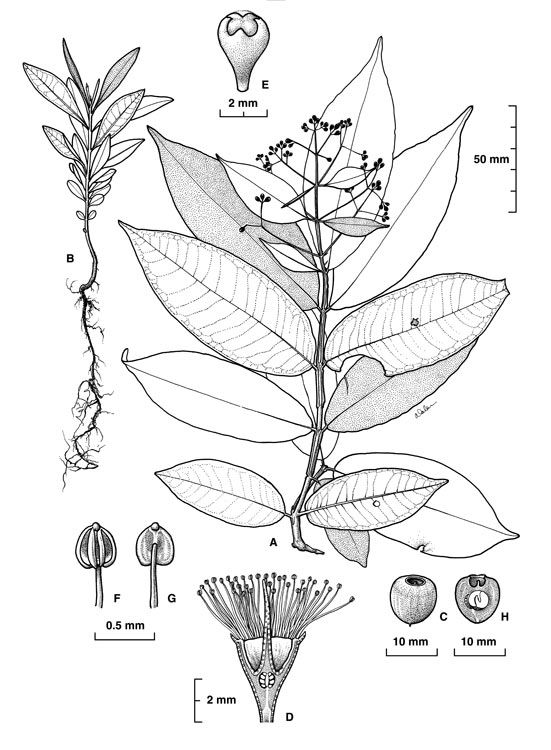
Botanical sketch

Syzygium alatoramulum, commonly known as tinkling satinash, is a plant in the clove and eucalyptus family Myrtaceae, found only in the Wet Tropics bioregion of Queensland, Australia.

== Description ==
Syzygium alatoramulum is a small poorly formed tree which may reach 20 m (66 ft) in height and 80 cm (30 in) trunk diameter, but is usually much smaller than this. The twigs are somewhat square in cross-section with conspicuous wings. The leaves are arranged in opposite pairs and are held on very short petioles (leaf stalks) about 5 mm (0.2 in) long. The leaf blades average about 10 cm (3.9 in) long and 3.5 cm (1.4 in) wide, with 10–15 pairs of conspicuous lateral veins. There are two intramarginal veins (that is, veins that run parallel to the leaf margin), the first of which is indistinct and about 1 mm from the margin, the second is conspicuous and about 4 mm (0.16 in) from the margin. Numerous pellucid glands, or 'oil dots', are visible to the naked eye.

The inflorescence is paniculate with flowers in triads, and they are produced either terminally or in the upper leaf axils. The flowers are white, four merous, and in bud they are shaped like a spinning top — after opening, the corolla tube tapers evenly into the pedicel, or flower stalk. The petals are rounded and about 1.5 mm (0.06 in) diameter, stamens are numerous and about 5 mm (0.20 in) long, and the pistil is about the same length or slightly longer.

The fruit is a berry about 15 mm (0.6 in) wide and long. It is white or cream, with a very subtle tinge of purple. It contains a single seed about 5 mm (0.20 in) in diameter.

=== Phenology ===
Flowering occurs from September to January, and fruit appear between January and March.

== Taxonomy ==
This plant was first described in 1983 by the Australian botanist Bernard Hyland. He published his description, which was based on material collected by himself in 1971, in the journal Australian Journal of Botany.

=== Etymology ===
The genus name Syzygium comes from the Ancient Greek sýzygos, meaning 'joined', 'yoked', or 'paired', and refers to the paired leaves. The species epithet alatoramulum is created from a combination of the Latin alatus, 'winged', and ramulus, 'branch' or 'twig', which refers to the prominent wings on the twigs.

== Distribution and habitat ==
Syzygium alatoramulum is restricted to a small part of NE Queensland, specifically the coastal areas from the Windsor Tableland to Mount Bartle Frere, at altitudes from 50 to 1,200 m (160 to 3,940 ft). It grows in wet eucalypt forest and rainforest, close to water courses, on soils derived from granite.

== Conservation ==
This species is listed as least concern under the Queensland Government's Nature Conservation Act. As of 18 July 2024, it has not been assessed by the International Union for Conservation of Nature (IUCN).

== Gallery ==
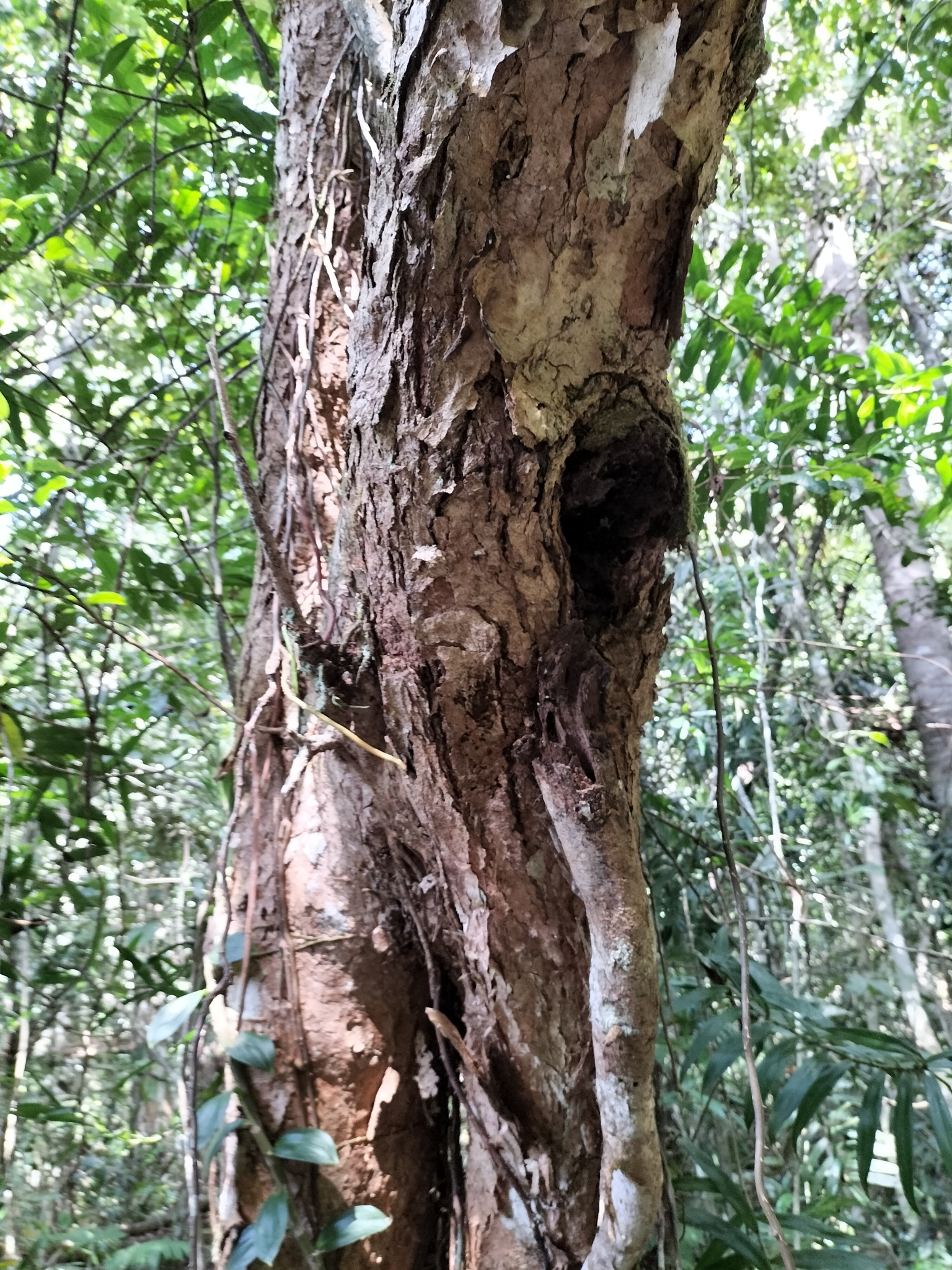
Trunk

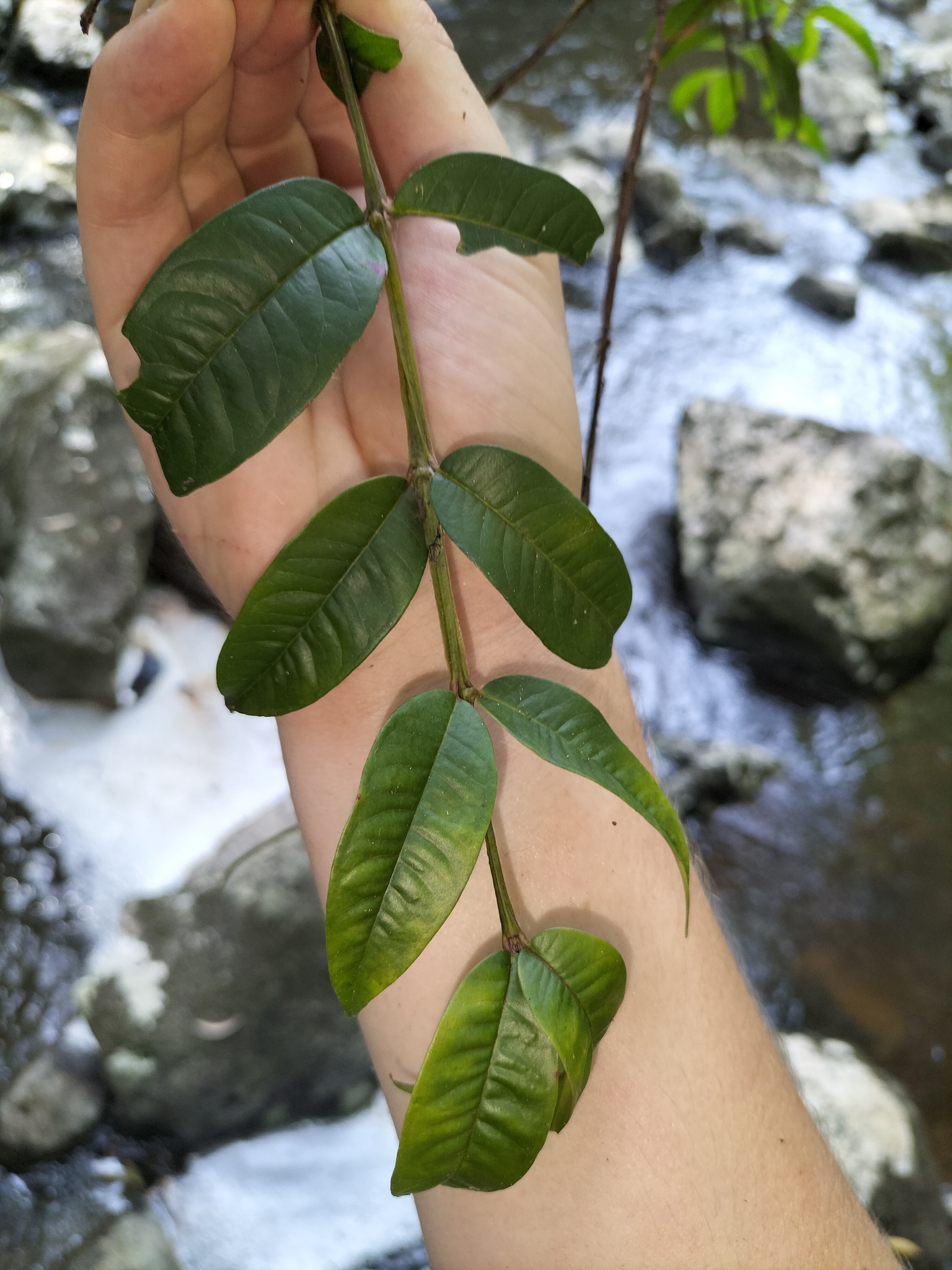
Leaves

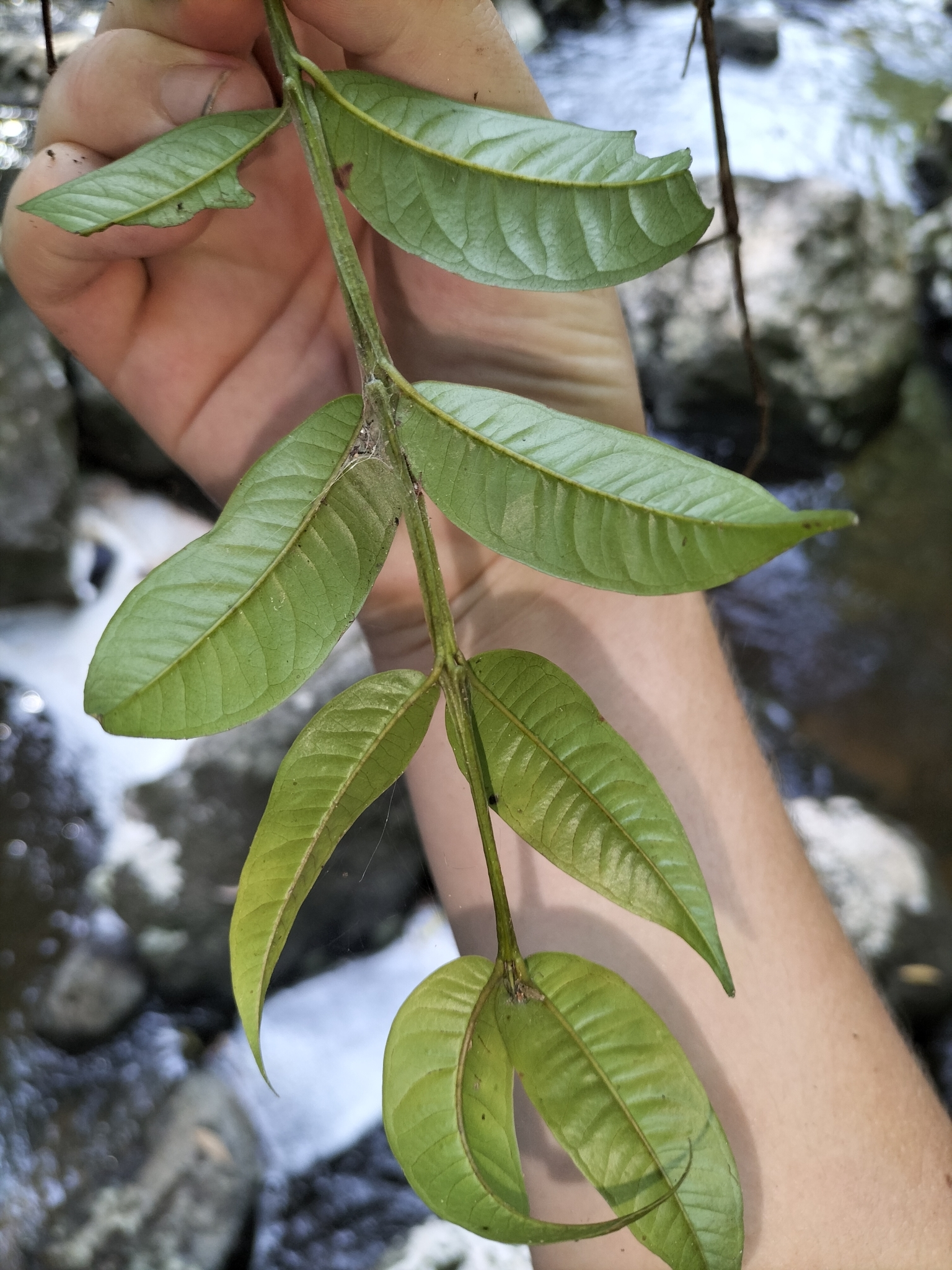
Underside of leaves

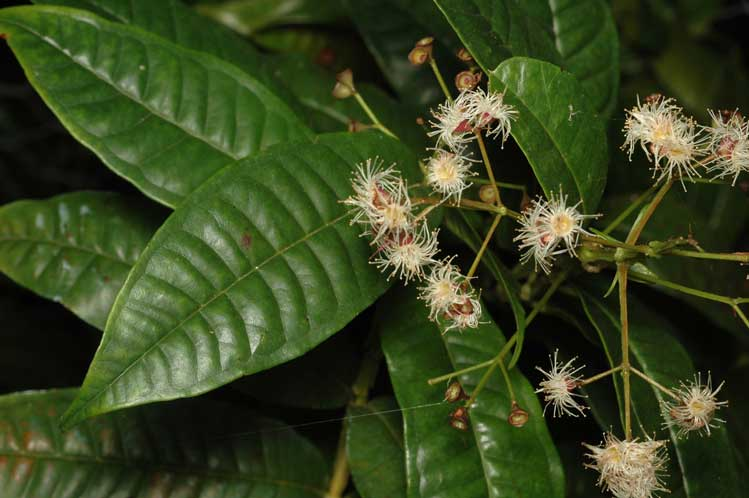
Flowers

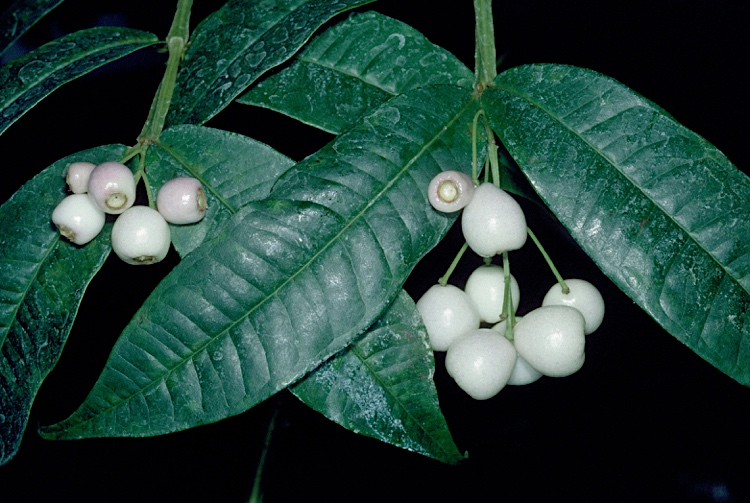
Fruit
