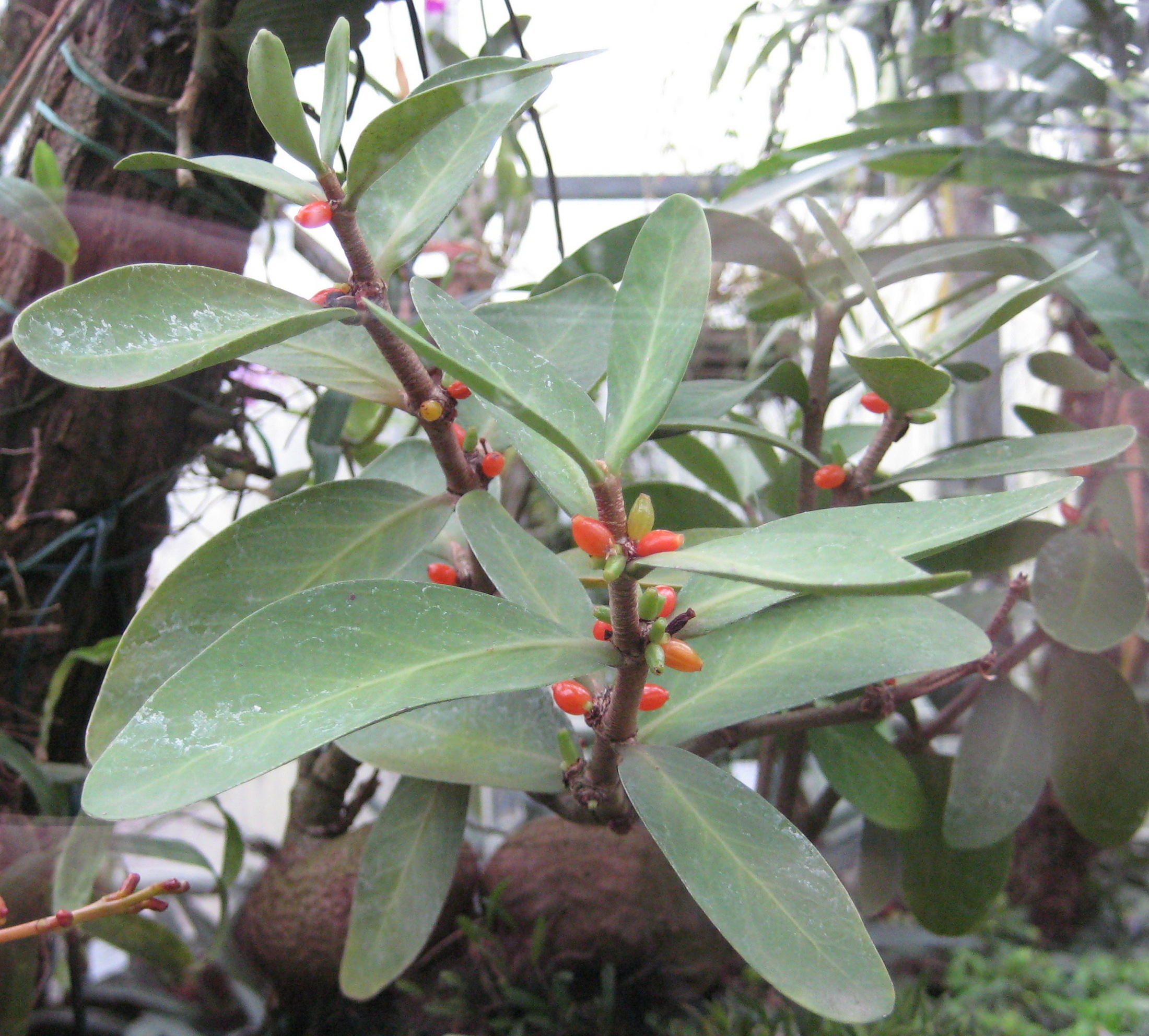

Scientific classification
- Kingdom: Plantae
- Clade: Tracheophytes
- Clade: Angiosperms
- Clade: Eudicots
- Clade: Asterids
- Order: Gentianales
- Family: Rubiaceae
- Genus: Hydnophytum
- Species: H. formicarum

Binomial name
- Hydnophytum formicarum Jack

= Hydnophytum formicarum =

Species of plant

Hydnophytum formicarum, commonly called a "Baboon's head" or "Ant plant", is an epiphyte native to Southeast Asia and is considered critically endangered in Singapore. It is a myrmecophyte as ants live in its tuber, also known as a caudex, and pollinate its flowers. It resides in open-canopied areas, rainforests, and terrestrial regions of high elevation.

== Description ==
This epiphyte grows a tuber also known as a caudex, that is spineless and contains chambers; many of which are connected to one another. These tubers may grow 10–55 cm in diameter with two to four stems that reach about 60 cm long. The leaves, which grow 4–15 cm long and 2–7 cm wide, are opposite, elliptical and have a leathery texture. Flowers are four-merous, white, and occur in groups of 3–10, which then yield orange, fleshy fruits 6–7 mm in diameter

== Mutualisms ==
=== Ants ===
Ants that have been reported to be inhabiting this myrmecophyte include: Iridomyrmex cordatus, Camponotus spp., Crematogaster spp., Monomorium spp., Tapinoma spp., and Paratrechina spp.

Hydnophytum formicarum has morphological structures that benefit ants, resulting in a mutualistic relationship between the two, making the plant a myrmecophyte. These structures include the domatia, hollow chambers along the roots and leaves of the plant, and the caudex, an enlarged stem-like structure. The domatia and caudex provide shelter for the ants, which is a major benefit to the ants as it protects them from external forces such as environmental factors or predation. Although the formation of these structures is energetically costly, the plant benefits as the caudex is a site where ants defecate and deposit debris. The caudex, in particular, requires great investment from the plant as it requires greater biomass compared to the rest of the plant and can cause it to fall from the surface it is growing on. The plant has evolved to grow a caudex as the benefits of ants outweighs the costs. Ant defecation is beneficial to the plant as the plant can absorb nutrients from it as well as the gases the ants release. Ants have high diets in animal tissue which is correlated to a faster release of nutrients and they trim encroaching vegetation. The cells lining the nest show layers enriched with endoplasmic reticulum, dictyosomes, mitochondria and higher levels of enzymes associated with absorptive surfaces. The plant receives ammonia, carbon dioxide, calcium and nitrogen from the ants, shown by radioactive tests as these nutrients move throughout the plant. These are all heavily reliant processes for this plant that usually occupies areas of otherwise nutrient deficient soil.

Studies on other epiphytes, such as Piper fimbriatum, have shown that the nutrients are absorbed by the walls of the caudex and domatia, and then move along a chemical gradient via the phloem and bulk flow to other parts of the plant. Nutrients that are absorbed are especially allocated to the newer parts of the plant, which then use these nutrients for growth and immunity. In the domatia, it has been found that there are smooth surfaces and rough, pocketed surfaces, and the rough surfaces are more efficient at absorbing nutrients from ant debri. This correlates to how ants tend to nest in these spaces, because they keep their living spaces on the smoother parts of the domatia, and defecate on the rough patches. There has not been much research done specifically about caudices and how they absorb the nutrients from the ant deposits.

Additionally, Hydnophytum formicarum has extrafloral nectaries, which are nectar-producing and secreting glands which contain groups of cells that make sugars. Nectar is produced from the sugars of photosynthesis. Nectar is then secreted via trichomes, where the nectar is secreted from vacuoles that are stored in the periplasmic space at the edge of the cell. These sugars attract ants to the plant, and provide them with energetic benefits that they then use to defend the plant against herbivory. Although the mechanism of how ants exactly prevent herbivory is unknown, it is clear that doing so will benefit the ants, despite the initial energetic costs of defense, in the long term due to further plant growth and sustenance of the caudex and domatia. Research done on Reynoutria × bohemica shows that extrafloral nectary activity is dictated by the seasons, where they are actively secreting nectar in the summer and go dormant in the winter months. However, it is unclear if this is the case for Hydnophytum formicarum.

A number of studies were done to investigate the ant plant in terms of morphology, mutual relationships, occupancies, physiology and ecology to understand the mechanisms that allow it to function the way it does. A compilation of such experimentation done by a variety of researchers was created by Camilla R. Huxley in which she investigated and analyzed all information discovered about the Hydnophytum formicarum to determine whether presence of ants were directly beneficial to plant conditions. One of the most directly observable studies consisted of feeding radioactive traces to the ants to see where they were deposited and how well it was absorbed by the plant. To do this plants were collected and planted into an area surrounded by a sticky material around the rim to prevent the ants from escaping. The ants were fed honey-water containing varying isotopic solutions - phosphate, sulfate, or methionine. Sections of the plant were later cut, collected, and chloroformed to kill ants in order to perform an autoradiography. Different areas of the plants were tested in order to compare the different depositions and uptake from the various surfaces. Results found that radioactivity was mainly seen on the warted cavities, the area with highest absorption rates, and vascular tissues of the stem, showing translocation of materials by the plant. Ultimately, there was a positive and direct correlation of higher radioactivity deposits on specific surfaces of the plant. It was concluded that Huxley's hypothesis was supported and that compounds fed to the ants could be radio isotopically seen to be deposited and readily absorbed through the plant.

In conclusion, Hydnophytum formicarum and these ants partake in a mutually beneficial relationship. They do so by attracting ants, via their extrafloral nectaries, and providing shelter for the ants in the form of the caudex and domatia, all while the ants prevent herbivory and provide nutrients to the plant.
