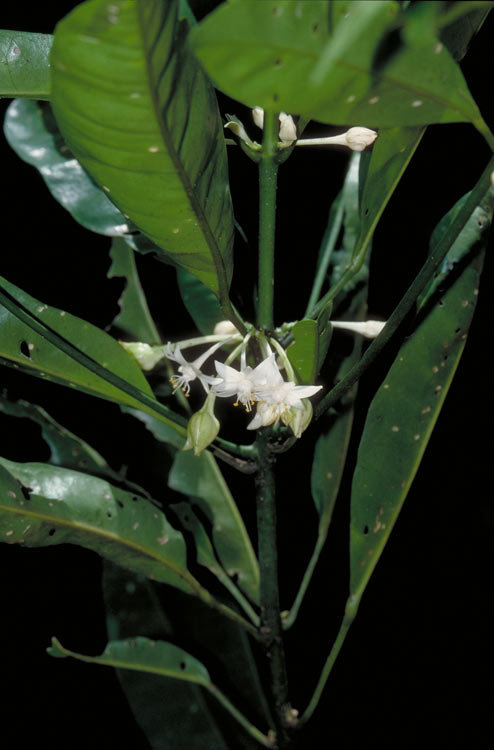

Scientific classification
- Kingdom: Plantae
- Clade: Tracheophytes
- Clade: Angiosperms
- Clade: Eudicots
- Clade: Rosids
- Order: Sapindales
- Family: Rutaceae
- Genus: Medicosma
- Species: M. fareana

Binomial name
- Medicosma fareana (F.Muell.) T.G.Hartley

Synonyms
- Euodia fareana F.Muell.; Melicepe fareana (F.Muell.) Engl.

= Medicosma fareana =

White aspen

Species of tree

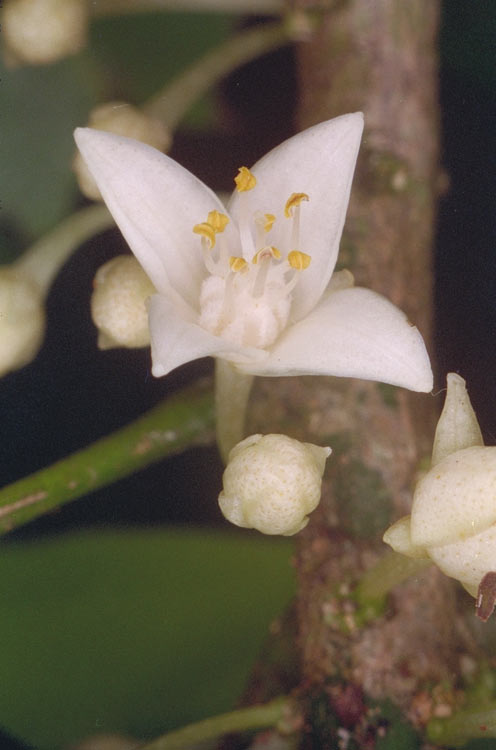
Flower detail

Medicosma fareana, commonly known as white aspen, is a species of rainforest small tree in the family Rutaceae and is endemic to north Queensland. It has elliptical leaves and white or cream-coloured flowers borne singly or in small groups in leaf axils.

== Description ==
Medicosma fareana is a tree that typically grows to a height of 10 mm (0.39 in). The leaves are arranged in opposite pairs, sometimes in whorls of three, and are elliptical to narrow egg-shaped with the narrower end towards the base, 70–280 mm (2.8–11.0 in) long and 20–85 mm (0.79–3.35 in) wide on a petiole 10–17 mm (0.39–0.67 in) long. The flowers are arranged singly or in small groups up to 40 mm (1.6 in) long, each flower on a pedicel 7–25 mm (0.28–0.98 in) long. The sepals are 3.5–5 mm (0.14–0.20 in) long and glabrous and the petals are white or cream-coloured, 7–7.5 mm (0.28–0.30 in) long, glabrous and persisting on the fruit where they increase in size to about 10 mm (0.39 in) long. Flowering occurs in most months and the fruit is a follicle 5.5–6 mm (0.22–0.24 in) long.

== Taxonomy ==
White aspen was first formally described in 1875 by Ferdinand von Mueller, who gave it the name Euodia fareana and published the description in the Fragmenta phytographiae Australiae from specimens collected near Rockingham Bay by John Dallachy. In 1985 Thomas Gordon Hartley changed the name to Medicosma fareana.

== Distribution and habitat ==
Medicosma fareana grows in rainforest from near Cooktown to Mount Fox in north Queensland.

== Conservation status ==
This species is classified as of "least concern" under the Queensland Government Nature Conservation Act 1992.
