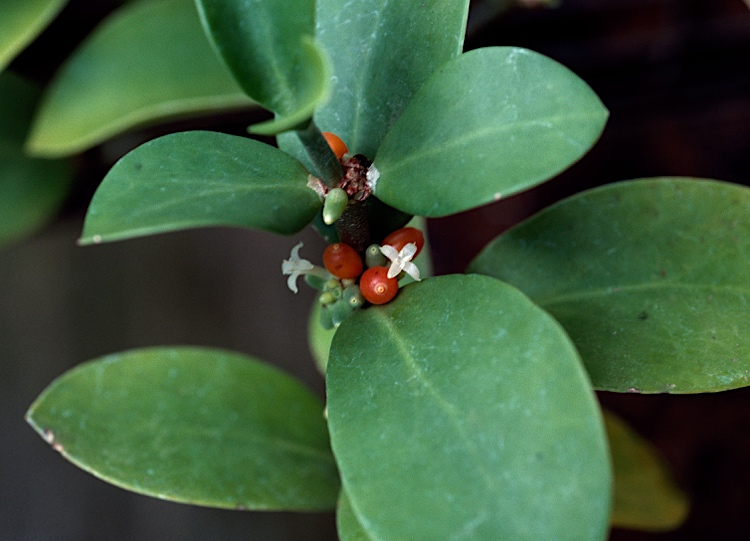
- Foliage, flowers and fruit

Conservation status
- Special Least Concern (NCA)

Scientific classification
- Kingdom: Plantae
- Clade: Tracheophytes
- Clade: Angiosperms
- Clade: Eudicots
- Clade: Asterids
- Order: Gentianales
- Family: Rubiaceae
- Genus: Hydnophytum
- Species: H. moseleyanum

Binomial name
- Hydnophytum moseleyanum Becc.

= Hydnophytum moseleyanum =

Smooth ant plant

Species of flowering plant

Hydnophytum moseleyanum, commonly known as smooth ant plant, is a plant in the coffee and gardenia family Rubiaceae native to the Philippines, New Guinea and Cape York Peninsula in Australia. It is an epiphyte that inhabits mangrove forest and rainforest, and it forms a symbiotic relationship with certain species of ants.

== Taxonomy ==
This species was first described in 1884 by the Italian botanist Odoardo Beccari, and published in his book Malesia.

== Conservation ==
This species is listed by the Queensland Government's Department of Environment, Science and Innovation as "special least concern", a rating unique to Queensland which is ranked between "least concern" and "near threatened". As of 14 August 2024, it has not been assessed by the International Union for Conservation of Nature (IUCN).
