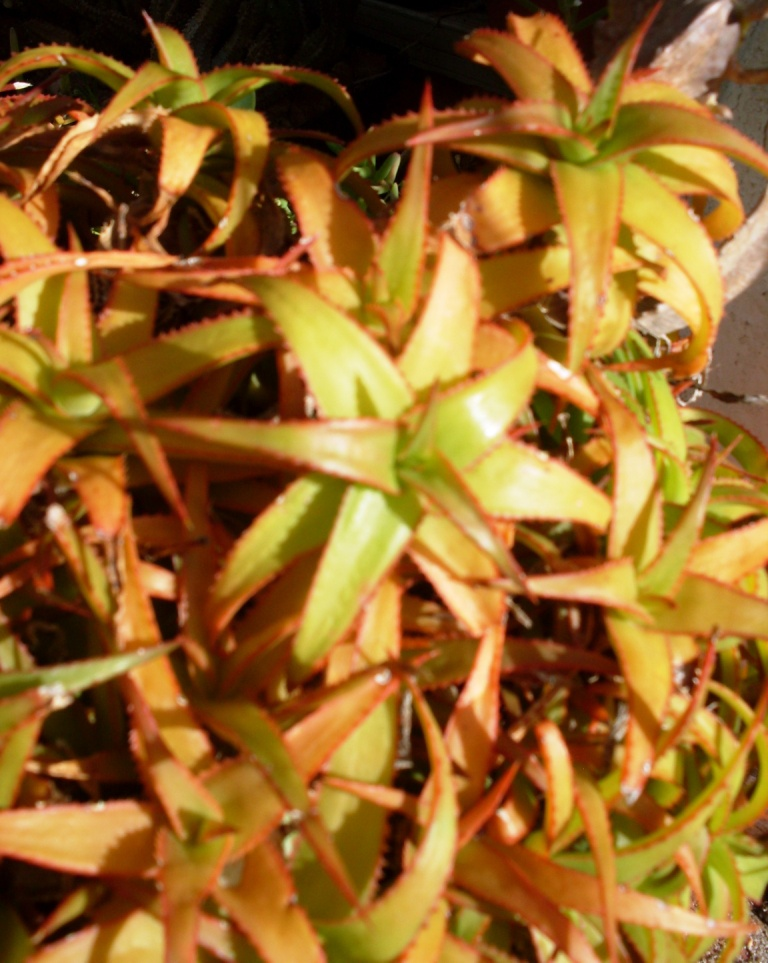

Conservation status
- Endangered (IUCN 3.1)
- CITES Appendix II (CITES)

Scientific classification
- Kingdom: Plantae
- Clade: Tracheophytes
- Clade: Angiosperms
- Clade: Monocots
- Order: Asparagales
- Family: Asphodelaceae
- Subfamily: Asphodeloideae
- Genus: Aloe
- Species: A. bruynsii

Binomial name
- Aloe bruynsii P.I.Forst.

= Aloe bruynsii =

Species of succulent

Aloe bruynsii is a species of flowering plant in the family Asphodelaceae. It is endemic to Madagascar.
