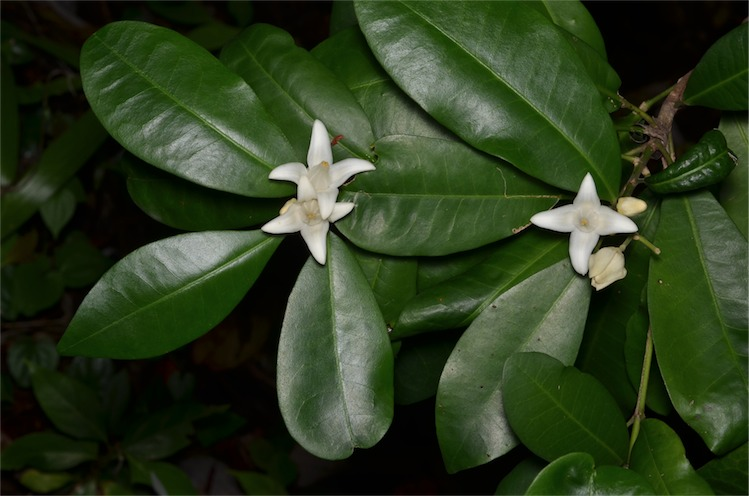
- In Tondoon Botanic Gardens, Gladstone

Scientific classification
- Kingdom: Plantae
- Clade: Tracheophytes
- Clade: Angiosperms
- Clade: Eudicots
- Clade: Rosids
- Order: Sapindales
- Family: Rutaceae
- Genus: Medicosma
- Species: M. cunninghamii

Binomial name
- Medicosma cunninghamii (Hook.) Benth. & Hook.f.

Synonyms
- Acronychia cunninghami Hook. orth. var.; Acronychia cunninghamii Hook.; Euodia cunninghami F.Muell. orth. var.; Euodia cunninghamii (Hook.) F.Muell.; Melicope cunninghami F.Muell. nom. inval., pro syn.; Melicosma cunninghamii F.M.Bailey orth. var.

= Medicosma cunninghamii =

Pinkheart

Species of shrub

Medicosma cunninghamii, commonly known as pinkheart or bonewood, is a species of shrub or small tree in the family Rutaceae and is endemic to eastern Australia. It has simple, narrow oblong to lance-shaped leaves and small white or cream-coloured flowers arranged in small groups.

== Description ==
Medicosma cunninghamii is a shrub or tree that typically grows to a height of 1–2 m (3 ft 3 in – 6 ft 7 in), its young growth with a few star-shaped hairs. The leaves are narrow oblong to lance-shaped with the narrower end towards the base, 45–230 mm (1.8–9.1 in) long and 15–75 mm (0.59–2.95 in) wide on a petiole 5–20 mm (0.20–0.79 in) long. The leaves are dull green with many small oil dots. The flowers are arranged in small groups 15–90 mm (0.59–3.54 in) long, each flower on a pedicel 2.4–12 mm (0.094–0.472 in) long. The sepals are 3–5 mm (0.12–0.20 in) long and covered with soft hairs on the outside. The petals are white or cream-coloured, 9–17 mm (0.35–0.67 in) long, softly-hairy at least on the back, and remain on the fruit, increasing in size to about 20 mm (0.79 in). Flowering mainly occurs from November to June and the fruit is 5–6.5 mm (0.20–0.26 in) long and hidden by the petal remnants.

== Taxonomy ==
Pinkheart was first formally described in 1842 by William Jackson Hooker who gave it the name Acronychia cunninghamii and published the description in the Botanical Magazine. The type specimens had been collected by Allan Cunningham near Moreton Bay and grown from seed in Kew Gardens. In 1862, George Bentham and Joseph Dalton Hooker changed the name to Medicosma cunninghamii in Genera Plantarum. The generic name Medicosma is from the Latin, referring to the citrus lemon scent of the leaves. The specific epithet (cunninghamii ) honours the explorer and botanist Allan Cunningham.

== Distribution and habitat ==
Medicosma cunninghamii grows in rainforest from sea level to an altitude of 500 m (1,600 ft) and is found from Gladstone in central-eastern Queensland to the Richmond River in New South Wales.

== Conservation status ==
This species is classified as of "least concern" under the Queensland Government Nature Conservation Act 1992.

== Use in horticulture ==
Pinkheart is often grown in cultivation. It has a dense form and makes a good screening plant.
