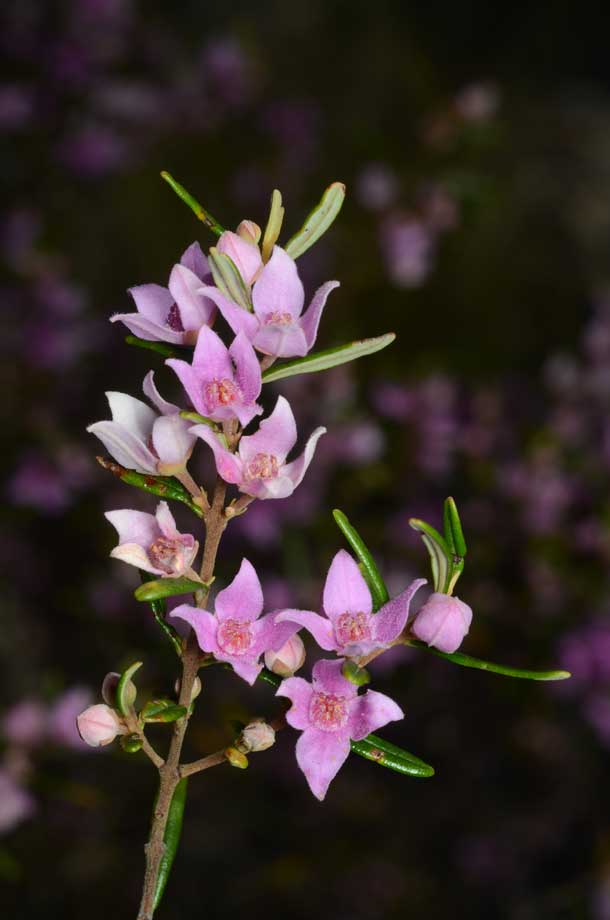
- Boronia forsteri in the Expedition National Park

Scientific classification
- Kingdom: Plantae
- Clade: Tracheophytes
- Clade: Angiosperms
- Clade: Eudicots
- Clade: Rosids
- Order: Sapindales
- Family: Rutaceae
- Genus: Boronia
- Species: B. forsteri

Binomial name
- Boronia forsteri Duretto
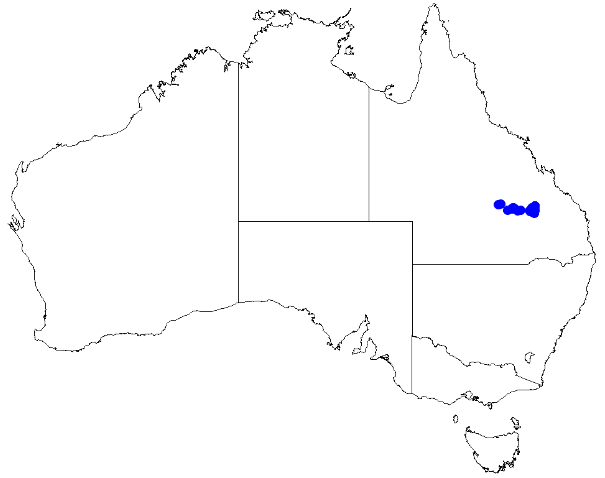
- Occurrence data from Australasian Virtual Herbarium

= Boronia forsteri =

Species of flowering plant

Boronia forsteri is a plant in the citrus family Rutaceae and is endemic to mountain ranges in central Queensland, Australia. It is an erect shrub with many branches, simple leaves with a densely hairy, pale underside, and pink, four-petalled flowers.

== Description ==
Boronia forsteri is an erect, many-branched shrub which grows to a height of about 1.0 m (3 ft) with its young branches densely covered with white to yellow hairs. The leaves are elliptic to egg-shaped, 6–25 mm (0.2–1 in) long and 0.5–5 mm (0.02–0.2 in) wide and lack a petiole. The lower surface of the leaf is a much paler colour than the upper surface and has a dense layer of hairs. Usually only one but sometimes up to three pink flowers are arranged on a hairy stalk up to 0.5 mm (0.020 in) long. The four sepals are egg-shaped to triangular, densely hairy, 2–2.5 mm (0.079–0.098 in) long and 1–1.5 mm (0.039–0.059 in) wide. The four petals are 4–6 mm (0.16–0.24 in) long, 2–3 mm (0.079–0.12 in) wide but enlarge as the fruit develop. The eight stamens are hairy. Flowering occurs in September and October and the fruit are 5–6 mm (0.20–0.24 in) long and about 3 mm (0.12 in) wide.

== Taxonomy and naming ==
Boronia forsteri was first formally described in 1999 by Marco F. Duretto and the description was published in the journal Austrobaileya from a specimen collected near the property "Glenhaugton". The specific epithet (forsteri) honours the Australian botanist Paul Irwin Forster.

== Distribution and habitat ==
This boronia grows in woodland and forest in sandstone country in the Chesterton, Carnarvon and Expedition Ranges and in the Central Highlands of Queensland.

== Conservation ==
Boronia forsteri is classed as "least concern" under the Queensland Government Nature Conservation Act 1992.
