= Phebalium distans =

Conservation status
- Endangered (EPBC Act)
- Endangered (NCA)

Scientific classification
- Kingdom: Plantae
- Clade: Tracheophytes
- Clade: Angiosperms
- Clade: Eudicots
- Clade: Rosids
- Order: Sapindales
- Family: Rutaceae
- Genus: Phebalium
- Species: P. distans

Binomial name
- Phebalium distans P.I.Forst.

Synonyms
- Phebalium squamulosum subsp. squamulosum auct. non Vent.: Wilson, Paul G. (1970)

Species of tree

Phebalium distans, commonly known as the Mt. Berryman phebalium, is a species of small tree that is endemic to south-east Queensland. It is more or less covered with silvery to rust-coloured scales and has warty branchlets, linear leaves and creamy yellow flowers in umbels on the ends of branchlets.

== Description ==
Phebalium distans is a tree that typically grows to a height of up to 8 m (26 ft), but is shrub-like when young. It is more or less covered with silvery to rust coloured scales except for the upper surface of the leaves and petals. It has warty branchlets and linear leaves that are glabrous and glossy green on the upper surface, densely covered with scales on the lower surface, 14–62 mm (0.55–2.44 in) long and 0.5–0.8 mm (0.020–0.031 in) wide on a petiole 1.7–3 mm (0.067–0.118 in) long. The flowers are creamy yellow and arranged in umbels, each flower on a pedicel 4–5 mm (0.16–0.20 in) long. The calyx is top-shaped, about 1 mm (0.039 in) long, glabrous on the inner surface and covered with warty glands on the outside. The petals are elliptical, about 3 mm (0.12 in) long and densely covered with scales on the back. Flowering occurs from August to September.

== Taxonomy and naming ==
Phebalium distans was first formally described in 2003 by Paul Irwin Forster in the journal Austrobaileya from specimens he collected on Mount Walla Range at Coalstoun Lakes, Queensland in 2002. The specific epithet (distans) means 'scattered' and "refers to the scattered extant populations of this species".

== Distribution and habitat ==
Phebalium distans is an ecotonal species occurring in or near remaining and isolated remnant semi-evergreen vine thickets. Remnant populations are found on Mount Berryman, the Mount Jones Plateau complex of the Booie Range near Kingaroy, the Walla Range at Coulstoun Lakes, Binjour (Binjour State Forest) and the plateau complex of the Speedwell Range near Proston in south-east Queensland.

=== Dispersal ===
Seed dispersal for this species is limited, with unknown viability. It is unclear what dispersal mechanisms Phebalium distans uses as it has not been studied.

== Reproduction ==
Phebalium distans has not been observed to reproduce vegetatively. Medium-term monitoring found no indication that vegetative reproduction occurred during disturbance or as a result of fire.

== Conservation status ==
Phebalium distans is classified as "endangered" under the Australian Government Environment Protection and Biodiversity Conservation Act 1999 and as "endangered" under the Queensland Government Nature Conservation Act 1992. The main threats to the species include vegetation clearing, road maintenance, urban development and weed invasion. Future threats which may affect this species include genetic erosion due to in-breeding and mining operations.
