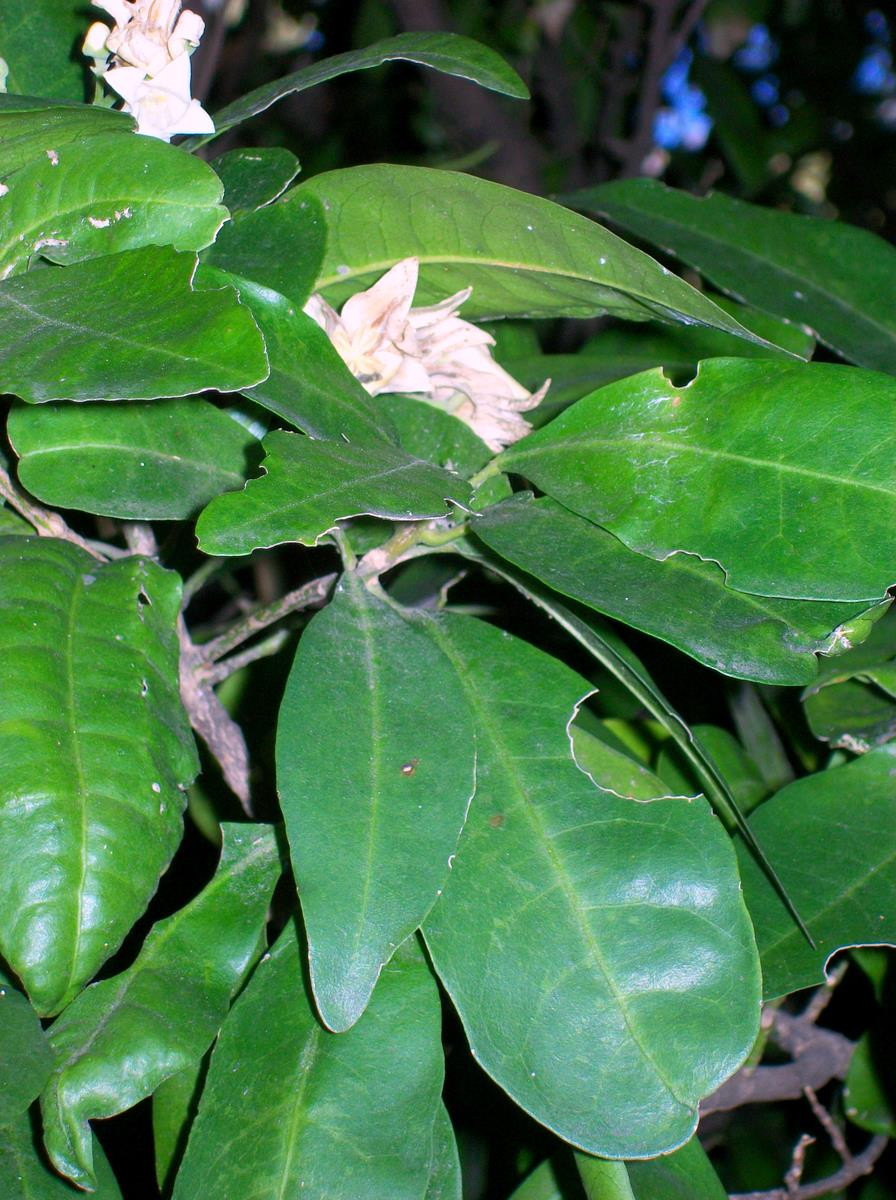
- Medicosma cunninghamii in the Royal Botanic Garden, Sydney

Scientific classification
- Kingdom: Plantae
- Clade: Tracheophytes
- Clade: Angiosperms
- Clade: Eudicots
- Clade: Rosids
- Order: Sapindales
- Family: Rutaceae
- Subfamily: Zanthoxyloideae
- Genus: Medicosma; Hook.f.

Synonyms
- Coombea P.Royen; Melicosma F.M.Bailey orth.var.

= Medicosma =

Genus of flowering plants

Medicosma is a genus of shrubs and trees in the family Rutaceae, all native to New Guinea, Australia or New Caledonia. They usually have simple leaves arranged in opposite pairs, flowers arranged in cymes with four sepals, four petals and eight stamens. The fruit is a follicle fused at the base in groups of up to four, each containing one or two brown or black seeds.

== Description ==
Plants in the genus Medicosma are shrubs or trees that usually have simple leaves arranged in opposite pairs but the leaves are sometimes arranged alternately and sometimes trifoliate. The flowers are usually arranged in cymes, sometimes solitary, in leaf axils and are usually bisexual with four sepals, four petals and eight stamens. The sepals are fused at the base and persist in the fruit. The petals are usually free from each other but usually overlap each other slightly. The fruit consists of up to four oval follicles fused at the base, each containing one or two brown to black seeds.

== Taxonomy ==
The genus Medicosma was first formally described in 1862 by William Jackson Hooker in Genera Plantarum.

=== Species list ===
The following is a list of species accepted by Plants of the World Online as at July 2020:

- Medicosma articulata T.G.Hartley – (New Caledonia)
- Medicosma congesta T.G.Hartley – (New Caledonia)
- Medicosma cunninghamii (Hook.) Benth. & Hook.f. – (N.S.W., Qld.)
- Medicosma diversifolia T.G.Hartley – (New Caledonia)
- Medicosma elliptica T.G.Hartley – (Qld.)
- Medicosma emarginata T.G.Hartley – (New Caledonia)
- Medicosma exigua T.G.Hartley – (New Caledonia)
- Medicosma fareana (F.Muell.) T.G.Hartley – (Qld.)
- Medicosma forsteri T.G.Hartley – (Qld.)
- Medicosma glandulosa T.G.Hartley – (Qld.)
- Medicosma gracilis T.G.Hartley – (New Caledonia)
- Medicosma heterophylla T.G.Hartley – (Qld.)
- Medicosma latifolia T.G.Hartley – (New Caledonia)
- Medicosma lerati (Guillaumin) T.G.Hartley – (New Caledonia)
- Medicosma mulgraveana T.G.Hartley – (Qld.)
- Medicosma obliqua T.G.Hartley – (New Caledonia)
- Medicosma obovata T.G.Hartley – (Qld.)
- Medicosma parvifolia T.G.Hartley – (New Caledonia)
- Medicosma petiolaris T.G.Hartley – (New Caledonia)
- Medicosma riparia (P.Royen) T.G.Hartley – (New Guinea)
- Medicosma sessiliflora (C.T.White) T.G.Hartley – (Qld.)
- Medicosma suberosa T.G.Hartley – (New Caledonia)
- Medicosma subsessilis T.G.Hartley – (New Caledonia)
- Medicosma tahafeana T.G.Hartley – (New Caledonia)
- Medicosma verticillata T.G.Hartley – (New Caledonia)
