= Acacia eremophiloides =

Conservation status
- Vulnerable (EPBC Act)

Scientific classification
- Kingdom: Plantae
- Clade: Tracheophytes
- Clade: Angiosperms
- Clade: Eudicots
- Clade: Rosids
- Order: Fabales
- Family: Fabaceae
- Subfamily: Caesalpinioideae
- Clade: Mimosoid clade
- Genus: Acacia
- Species: A. eremophiloides

Binomial name
- Acacia eremophiloides Pedley & P.I.Forst.
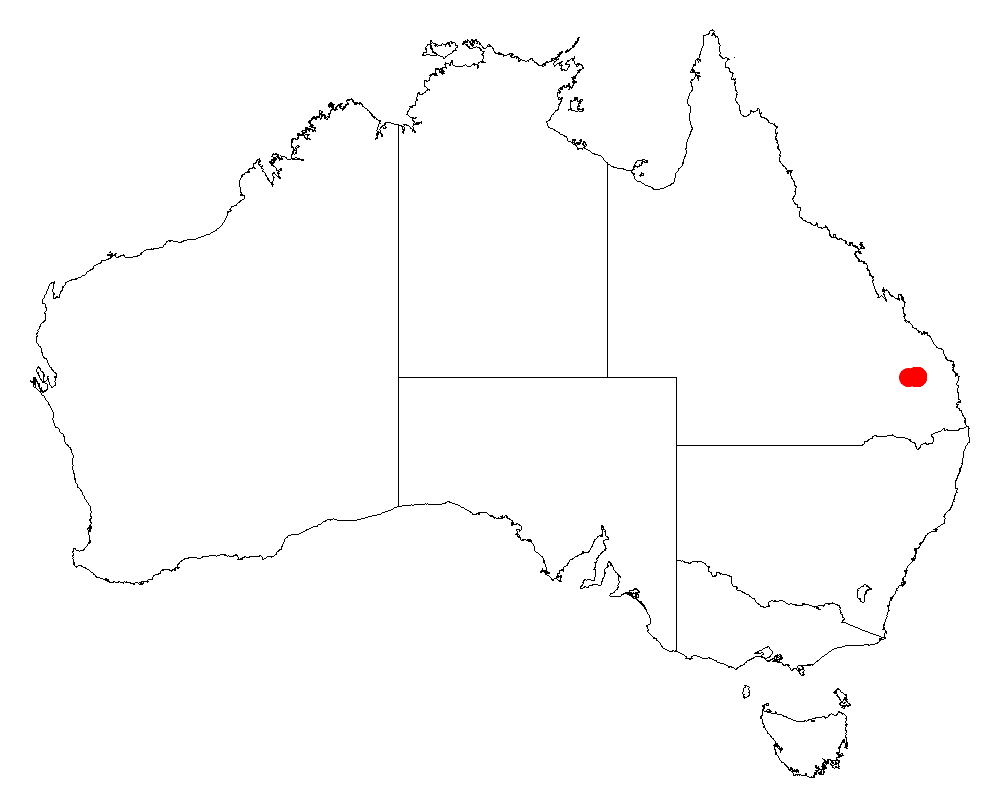
- Occurrence data from AVH

Synonyms
- Racosperma eremophiloides (Pedley & P.I.Forst.) Pedley

Species of legume

Acacia eremophiloides is a species of flowering plant in the family Fabaceae and is endemic to a restricted part of Queensland, Australia. It is a glabrous shrub with slender branchlets, linear phyllodes, heads of golden yellow flowers, and linear, cinnamon brown pods.

== Description ==
Acacia eremophiloides is a resinous, glabrous shrub that typically grows to a height of up to 2.5 m (8 ft 2 in) and has slender branchlets. Its phyllodes are linear, 40–65 mm (1.6–2.6 in) long, 2.5–4 mm (0.098–0.157 in) wide and leathery, with the midrib and margins quite prominent. The flowers are borne in one or two spherical heads in axils on a peduncle 8–10 mm (0.31–0.39 in) long, each head with about 30 golden yellow flowers. Flowering has been recorded in August and September, and the pods are linear, convex over the seeds, up to 80 mm (3.1 in) long, 3.5 mm (0.14 in) wide and cinnamon brown. The seeds are 3.3 mm (0.13 in) long with an aril.

== Taxonomy ==
Acacia eremophiloides was first formally described in 1986 by Leslie Pedley and Paul Irwin Forster in the journal Austrobaileya from specimens collected by Forster. The specific epithet (eremophiloides) alludes "to the superficial similarity of small individuals to species of Eremophila".

== Distribution and habitat ==
This species of wattle grows on a granite outcrop at an altitude of 460–550 m (1,510–1,800 ft) and is geographically restricted to an area of 4–5 ha (9.9–12.4 acres) in south-eastern Queensland, south of Mundubbera. The population has a range of around 10 km (6.2 mi) and is composed of around 5,000 plants.

== Conservation status ==
Acacia eremophiloides is listed as "vulnerable" under the Australian Government Environment Protection and Biodiversity Conservation Act 1999 and the Queensland Government Nature Conservation Act.

== See also ==
- List of Acacia species
