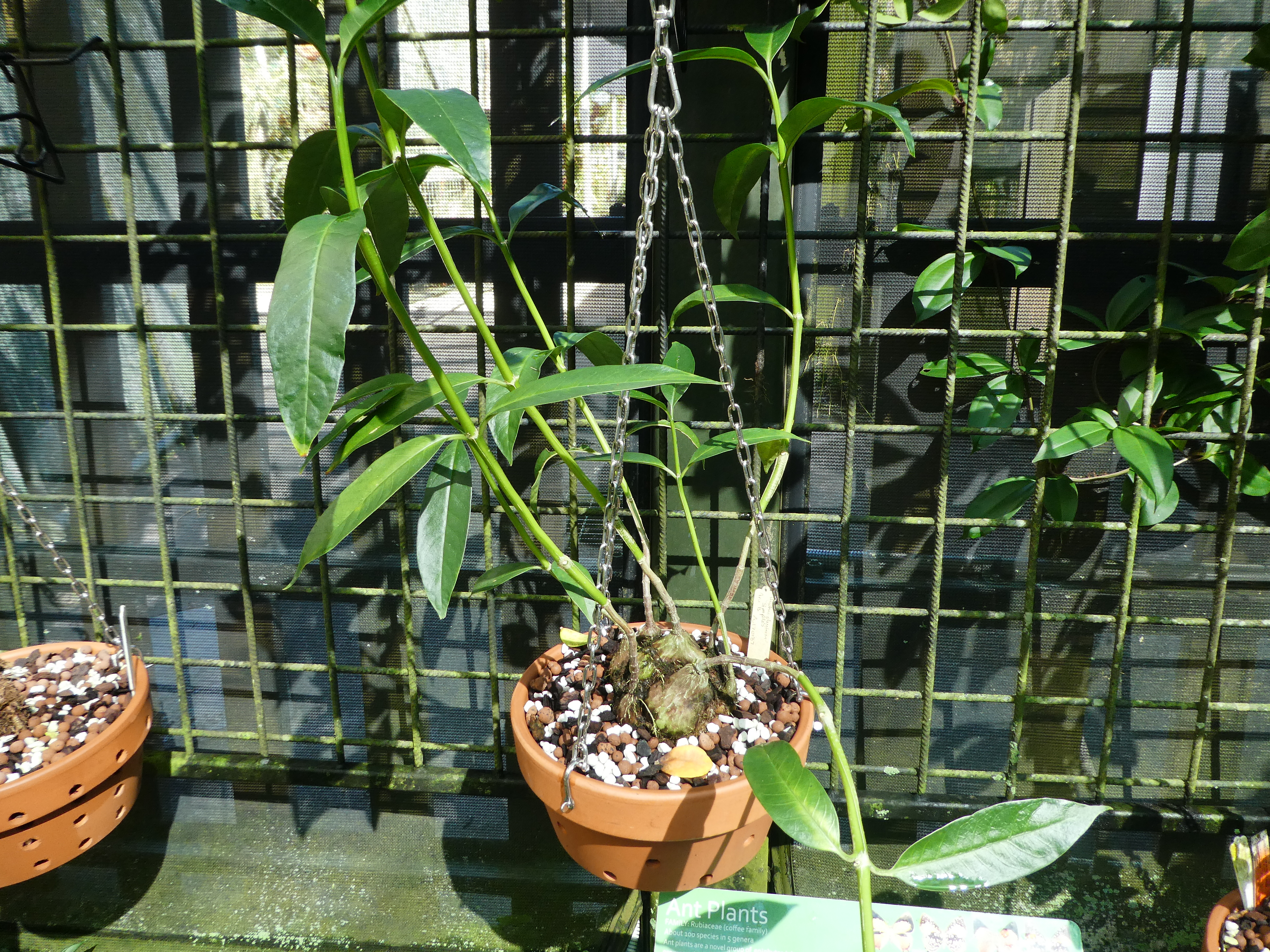
- At Cairns Botanic Gardens

Scientific classification
- Kingdom: Plantae
- Clade: Tracheophytes
- Clade: Angiosperms
- Clade: Eudicots
- Clade: Asterids
- Order: Gentianales
- Family: Rubiaceae
- Genus: Hydnophytum
- Species: H. radicans

Binomial name
- Hydnophytum radicans Becc.

= Hydnophytum radicans =

Species of flowering plant

Hydnophytum moseleyanum is a plant in the coffee and gardenia family Rubiaceae native to the Maluku Islands and New Guinea. It is an epiphyte that inhabits mangrove forest and rainforest, and it forms a symbiotic relationship with certain species of ants. It was first described in 1884 by the Italian botanist Odoardo Beccari, and published in his book Malesia.
