= Paul Irwin Forster =

Australian botanist (born 1961)

- Born: Paul Irwin Forster; 3 November 1961 (age 64); Christchurch
- Education: B.Sc. (Hon) UQ 1983, M.Sc. UQ 1990, D.Sc. UQ 2004
- Scientific career
- Fields: Botany, Spermatophytes
- Author abbrev. (botany): P.I.Forst.

Paul Irwin Forster (born 1961) is an Australian botanist. He obtained his doctorate from the University of Queensland in 2004 with his thesis The pursuit of plants : studies on the systematics, ecology and chemistry of the vascular flora of Australia and related regions.

He has worked at the Queensland Herbarium since 1991 as a plant taxonomist and has been editor of Austrobaileya since 2005. His research interests are the systematics of vascular plants and reproductive and conservation biology of cycads.

He has also published extensively on plant-insect interactions ( See, e.g.,) and on the family Apocynaceae.

== Plants named in his honour ==
- Aristida forsteri B.K.Simon
- Boronia forsteri Duretto
- Hibiscus forsteri F.D.Wilson
- Medicosma forsteri T.G.Hartley
- Marsdenia forsteri I.M.Turner
- Micromyrtus forsteri A.R.Bean
- Parmotrema forsteri Elix & R.W.Rogers
- Parsonsia paulforsteri J.B.Williams
- Prolixus forsteri J.J.Beard
- Psydrax forsteri S.T.Reynolds & R.J.F.Hend.

(from CHAH biography)

== Published names ==
Forster has published 489 botanic names as of 22 March 2024. A selection of them appears below.

- Acacia eremophiloides Pedley & P.I.Forst.
- Aloe bruynsii P.I.Forst.
- Borya inopinata P.I.Forst. & E.J.Thomps.
- Coleus dumicola (P.I.Forst.) P.I.Forst.
- Croton multicaulis P.I.Forst.
- Euphorbia brassii P.I.Forst.
- Leichhardtia papillosa (P.I.Forst.) P.I.Forst.
- Macrozamia conferta D.L.Jones & P.I.Forst.
- Marsdenia muelleri (Benth.) P.I.Forst.
- Plectranthus arenicola P.I.Forst.
- Phebalium distans P.I.Forst.
- Tylophora brassii P.I.Forst.
- Zieria vagans Duretto & P.I.Forst.

For a full list of all names authored by Forster, see his profile at the International Plant Names Index. See also this list of Wikipedia articles of taxa named by him.

== Some publications ==
- (1989) Ecophysiological, morphological and anatomical variation between selected provenances of Eucalyptus grandis and E. saligna (Myrtaceae)
- (1990) Proposal to Conserve Marsdenia R. Br. against Stephanotis Thouars (Asclepiadaceae). Taxon 39 ( 2): 364-367
- (1991) A taxonomic revision of Cynanchum L. (Asclepiadaceae: Asclepiadoideae) in Australia. Australian systematic botany 3
- (1991) A taxonomic revision of Gymnanthera R.Br. (Asclepiadaceae: Periplocoideae) in Australia. Australian systematic botany 4
- (1992) A taxonomic revision of Alstonia (Apocynaceae) in Australia. Australian systematic botany 5
- 1992b. New Varietal Combinations in Agave Vivipara (Agavaceae). Brittonia 44 ( 1): 74-75
- (1993) Rediscovery of Euphorbia carissoides (Euphorbiaceae). Australian Systematic Botany 6 (3): 269-272
- (1993) Taxonomic Relationships and Status of the Genus Dorystephania (Asclepiadaceae: Marsdenieae) from the Philippines and Borneo. Australian Systematic Botany 6 ( 4): 351-357
- (1994) Type collections of Asclepiadaceae at Herbarium Bogoriense (BO). Australian Systematic Botany 7 (5 ): 507-519
- (1995) New names and combinations in Marsdenia (Asclepiadaceae: Marsdenieae) from Asia and Malesia (excluding Papusia). Australian Systematic Botany 8 ( 5): 691-701
- (1995) Corrigenda — Circumscription of Marsdenia (Asclepiadaceae: Marsdenieae), with a revision of the genus in Australia and Papuasia. Australian Systematic Botany 8 (5 ): 703-933
- (1995) Circumscription ofMarsdenia (Asclepiadaceae: Marsdenieae), with a revision of the genus in Australia and Papuasia. Australian Systematic Botany 8 ( 5): 703-933
- ----, PC van Welzen. 1999. The Malesian species of Choriceras, Fontainea, and Petalostigma (Euphorbiaceae). Blumea, J.Plant Taxonomy & Geography 44-1
- Terry, I., CJ Moore, GH Walter, PI Forster, RB Roemer, J Donaldson, P Machin. (2004) Association of cone thermogenesis and volatiles with pollinator specificity in Macrozamia cycads. Plant Systematics and Evolution 243: 233-247
- Chemnick, J, R Oberprieler, J Donaldson, I Terry, R Osborne, W Tang, PI Forster. (2004) Insect pollinators of cycads: protocol for collecting and studying cycad pollinators. The Cycad Newsletter 27 (5): 3-7
- Terry, I, G Walter, C Moore, PI Forster, P Machin, J Donaldson. (2004) Cone volatiles of selected Macrozamia species and their possible role in pollinator specificity and species isolation. pp. 155–169. En Ed. A. Lindstrom (ed.). Proc. from the 61º International Cycad Conference on Cycad Biology, Nong Nooch Tropical Botanical Garden, Tailandia. 155-169
- Rasikari, HL, Leach, DN, Waterman, PG, Spooner-Hart, RN, Basta, AH, Banbury, LK & Forster, PI. (2005) Acaricidal and cytotoxic activities of extracts from selected genera of Australian Lamiaceae. J. of Economic Entomology 98 ( 4): 1259-1266
- Rasikari, HL, Leach, DN, Waterman, PG, Spooner-Hart, RN, Basta, AH, Banbury, LK, Winter, KM & Forster, PI. (2005) Cytotoxic clerodane diterpenes from Glossocarya calcicola. Phytochemistry 66 ( 24): 2844-2850
- Terry, I, G Walter, C Moore, PI Forster, J Donaldson. (2005) Pollination of Australian Macrozamia cycads - effectiveness and behavior of specialist vectors in a dependent mutualism. Am. J. of Botany
- Wanntorp, L; PI Forster. (2007). Phylogenetic relationships between Hoya and the monotypic genera Madangia, Absolsmia, and Micholitzia (Apocynaceae, Marsdenieae): Insights from flower morphology. Missouri Botanical Garden
- Terry, I, PI Forster, R Roemer, P Machin, C Moore. (2008). Does Macrozamia platyrhachis (Zamiaceae) deserve endangered species status? Conservation and pollination biology of a geographically restricted cycad. Australian J. of Botany
