= Australian Journal of Botany =

Peer-reviewed journal

- Discipline: Botany
- Language: English
- Edited by: John Morgan; Mark Ooi

Publication details
- History: 1953–present
- Publisher: CSIRO Publishing (Australia)
- Frequency: 8/year
- Impact factor: 1.24 (2020)

Standard abbreviations
- ISO 4: Aust. J. Bot.

Indexing
- ISSN: 0067-1924 (print); 1444-9862 (web)

Links
- Journal homepage

The Australian Journal of Botany is a peer-reviewed scientific journal published by CSIRO Publishing. It covers all areas of plant biology, with a focus on Southern Hemisphere ecosystems. As of 2024, the editors-in-chief are John Morgan (La Trobe University) and Mark Ooi (University of New South Wales). The journal was previously edited by Dick Williams (CSIRO and Charles Darwin University).

== Abstracting and indexing ==
The journal is abstracted and indexed in AGRICOLA, Elsevier Biobase, BIOSIS Previews, CAB Abstracts, Chemical Abstracts Service, Current Contents/Agriculture, Biology & Environmental Sciences, Science Citation Index, and Scopus. According to the Journal Citation Reports, the journal has a 2020 impact factor of 1.24.
