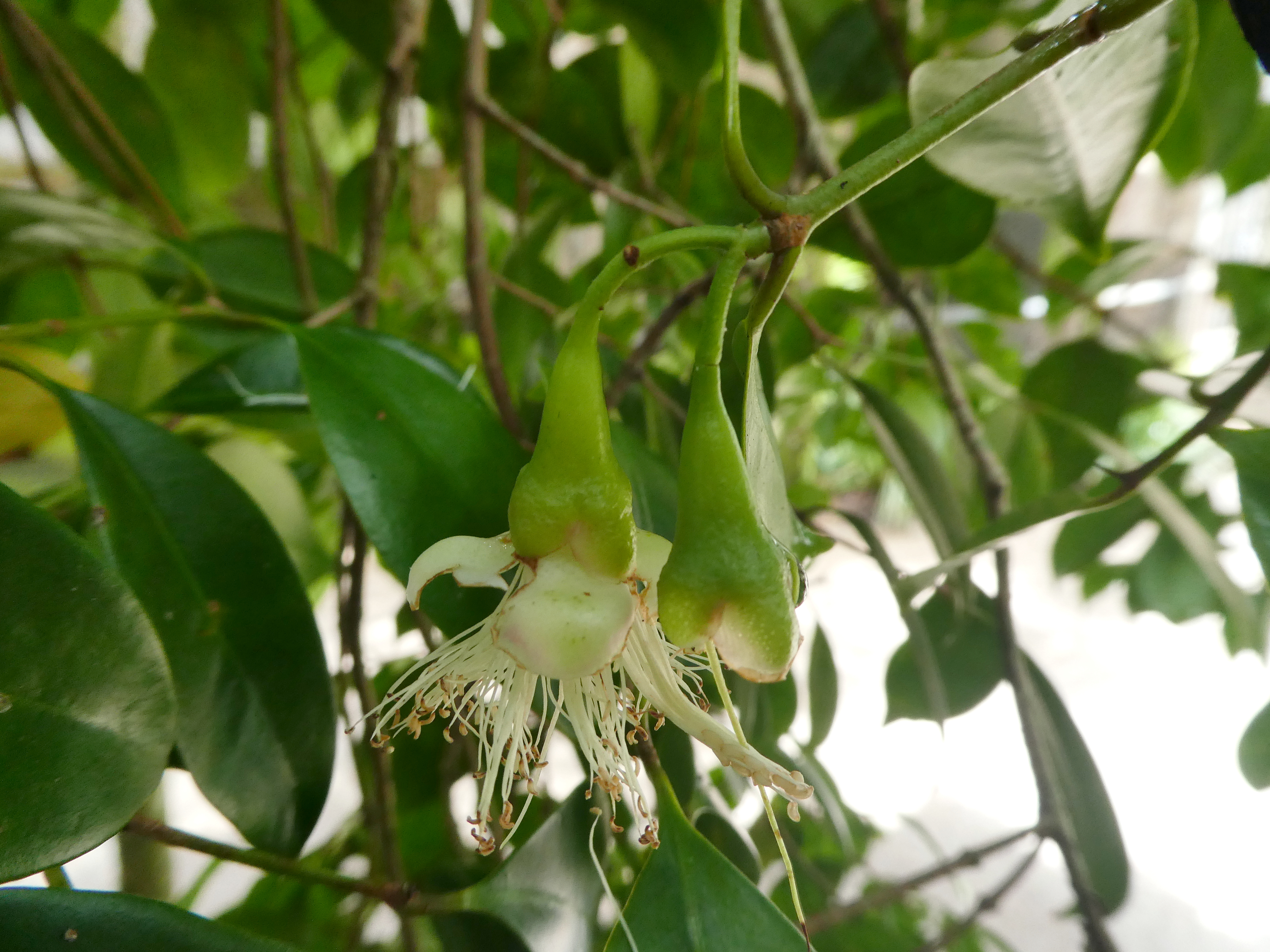
- In flower at Cairns Botanic Gardens

Conservation status
- Least Concern (NCA)

Scientific classification
- Kingdom: Plantae
- Clade: Embryophytes
- Clade: Tracheophytes
- Clade: Spermatophytes
- Clade: Angiosperms
- Clade: Eudicots
- Clade: Rosids
- Order: Myrtales
- Family: Myrtaceae
- Genus: Syzygium
- Species: S. maraca

Binomial name
- Syzygium maraca Craven & Biffin

= Syzygium maraca =

Species of flowering plant

Syzygium maraca is a plant in the clove family Myrtaceae found only in the Wet Tropics bioregion of Queensland, Australia. It was first described in 2005 and has been given the conservation status of least concern. It has an affinity with Syzygium alliiligneum.

== Description ==
Syzygium maraca is a small evergreen tree up to 24 m (79 ft) tall and 70 cm (28 in) trunk diameter, with flaking or peeling, brown or red-brown bark. The leaf-bearing twigs are about 2 mm (0.1 in) in diameter and may be rounded or slightly flattened. The leaves are simple (undivided) and arranged in opposite pairs on the twigs. The leaf blades are elliptic to obovate, measure up to 13 cm (5.1 in) long by 6 cm (2.4 in) wide, and are held on a petiole about 10 mm (0.4 in) long. They have between 8 and 16 straight and evenly spaced lateral veins on either side of the midrib, which diverge from the midrib at an angle between 50° and 70°. An intramarginal vein is present just inside the leaf margin.

The inflorescences are cymes produced either at the end of the twigs or in the outermost leaf axils, and they carry between one and four flowers. The flowers have short pedicels, four green sepals and four white petals, the latter falling early. They have numerous white stamens up to 33 mm (1.3 in) long and the style is about 40 mm (1.6 in) long.

The fruit is a botanical berry, somewhat pear-shaped and often curved on the longitudinal axis. They measure up to 11 cm (4.3 in) long by 5.5 cm (2.2 in) wide, are red to dark red in colour and the persistent calyx lobes form a prominent 'beak'. There is a single large seed surrounded by a thin pericarp

=== Phenology ===
Flowering has been observed between February and July, and fruits between June and January.

== Taxonomy ==
This species was informally described and illustrated in 2004, as Syzygium sp. (Noah Creek), in Wendy Cooper's book Fruits of the Australian Tropical Rainforest. In the following year Lyndley Craven and Edward Sturt Biffin published a formal description in the journal Blumea.

=== Etymology ===
The genus name Syzygium comes from the Ancient Greek sýzygos, meaning 'joined', 'yoked', or 'paired', and refers to the paired leaves. The species epithet maraca is a reference to the fact that the seed may become loose inside the fruit and cause it to rattle when shaken, like a maraca.

== Distribution and habitat ==
The native range of this tree is in two distinct groups, one north of Cairns in the lowlands from Mossman Gorge to Cape Tribulation, and the other in highlands southwest of Cairns in the Wooroonooran National Park. It inhabits rainforest at altitudes from 15 m (49 ft) to 720 m (2,360 ft).

== Conservation ==
This species is listed as least concern under the Queensland Government's Nature Conservation Act. As of 2 November 2024, it has not been assessed by the International Union for Conservation of Nature (IUCN).

== Uses ==
It has been suggested that the species may have potential as a commercial fruit.

== Gallery ==
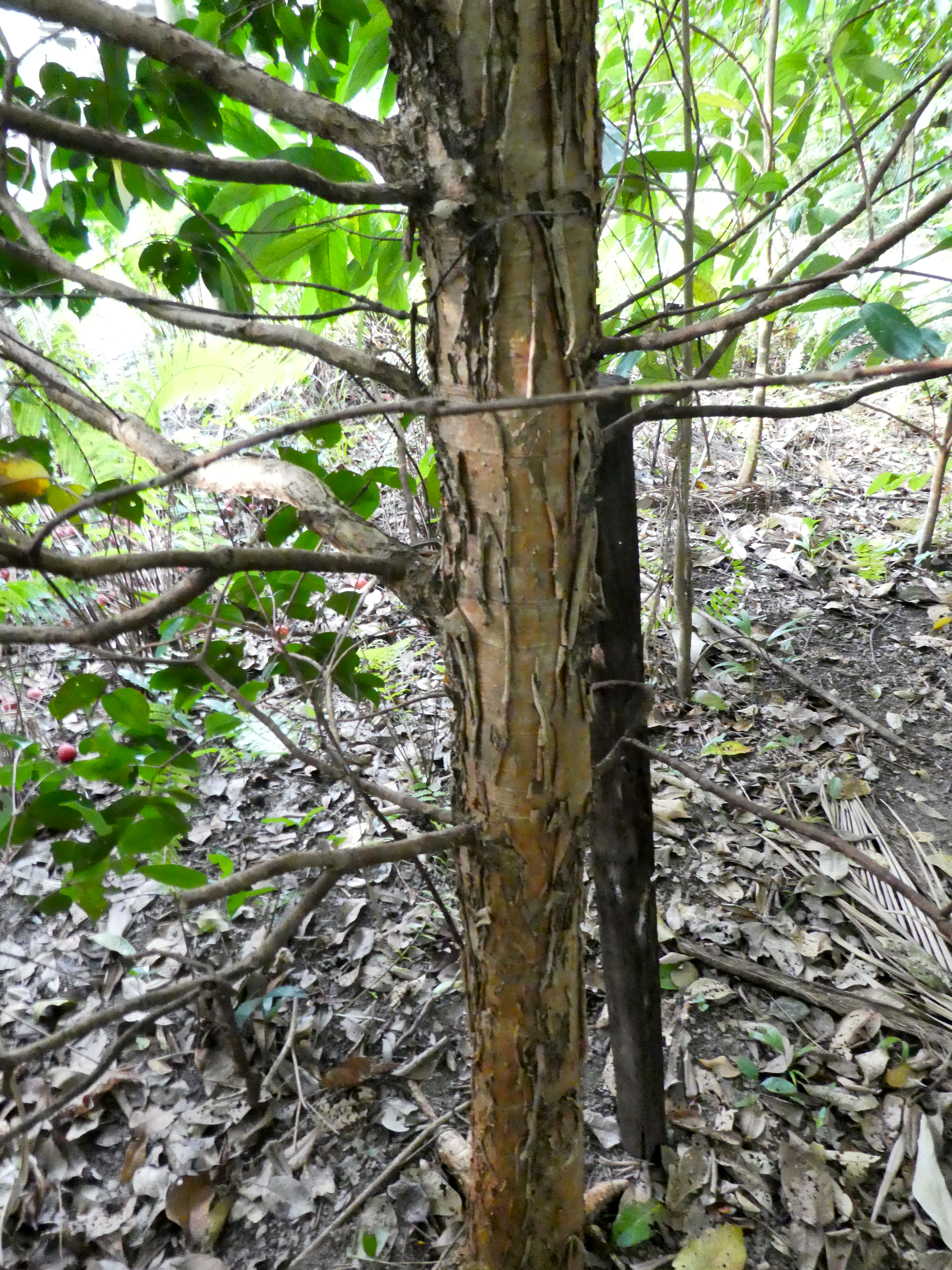
Trunk with peeling bark

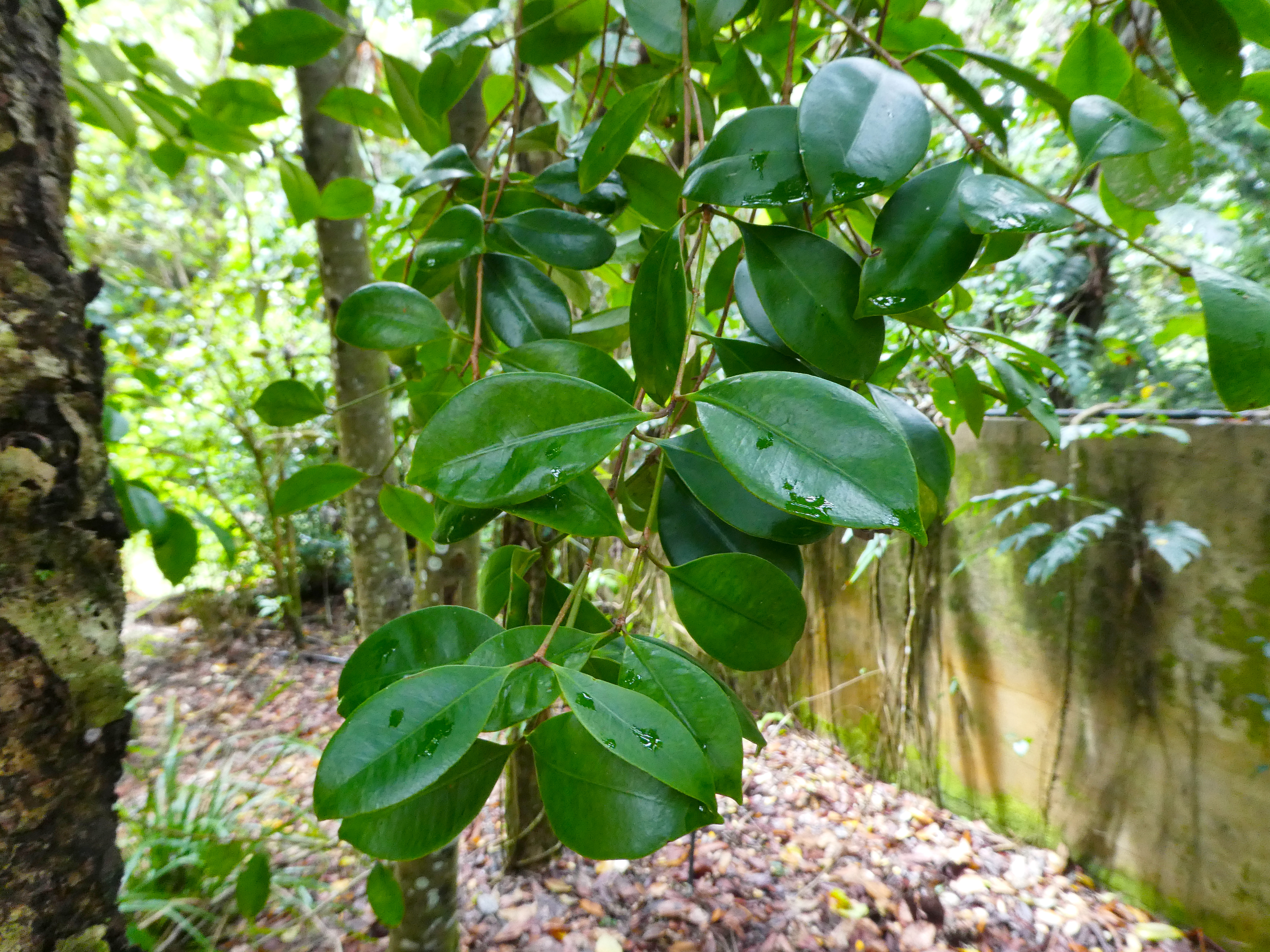
Foliage

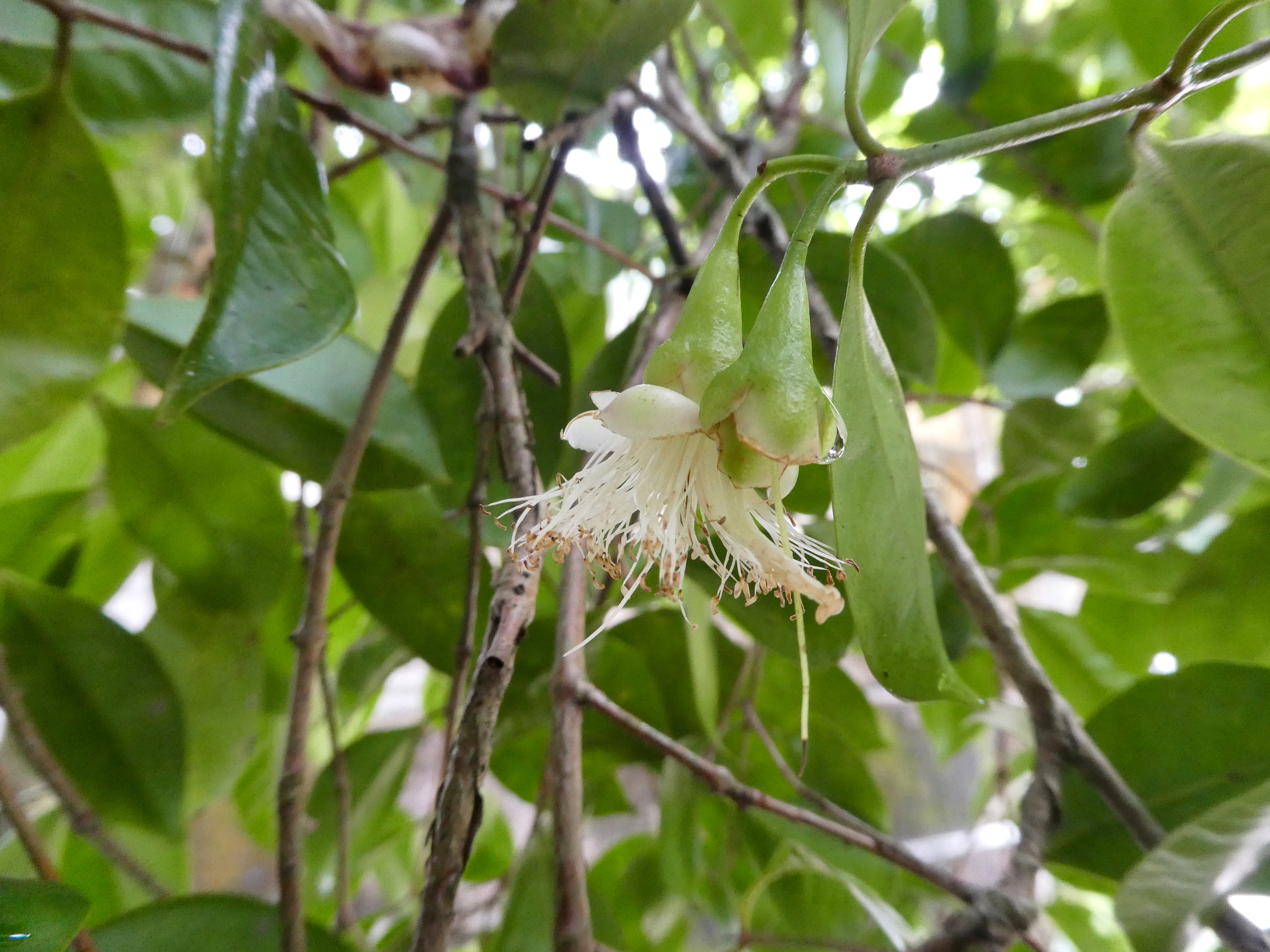
Flowers

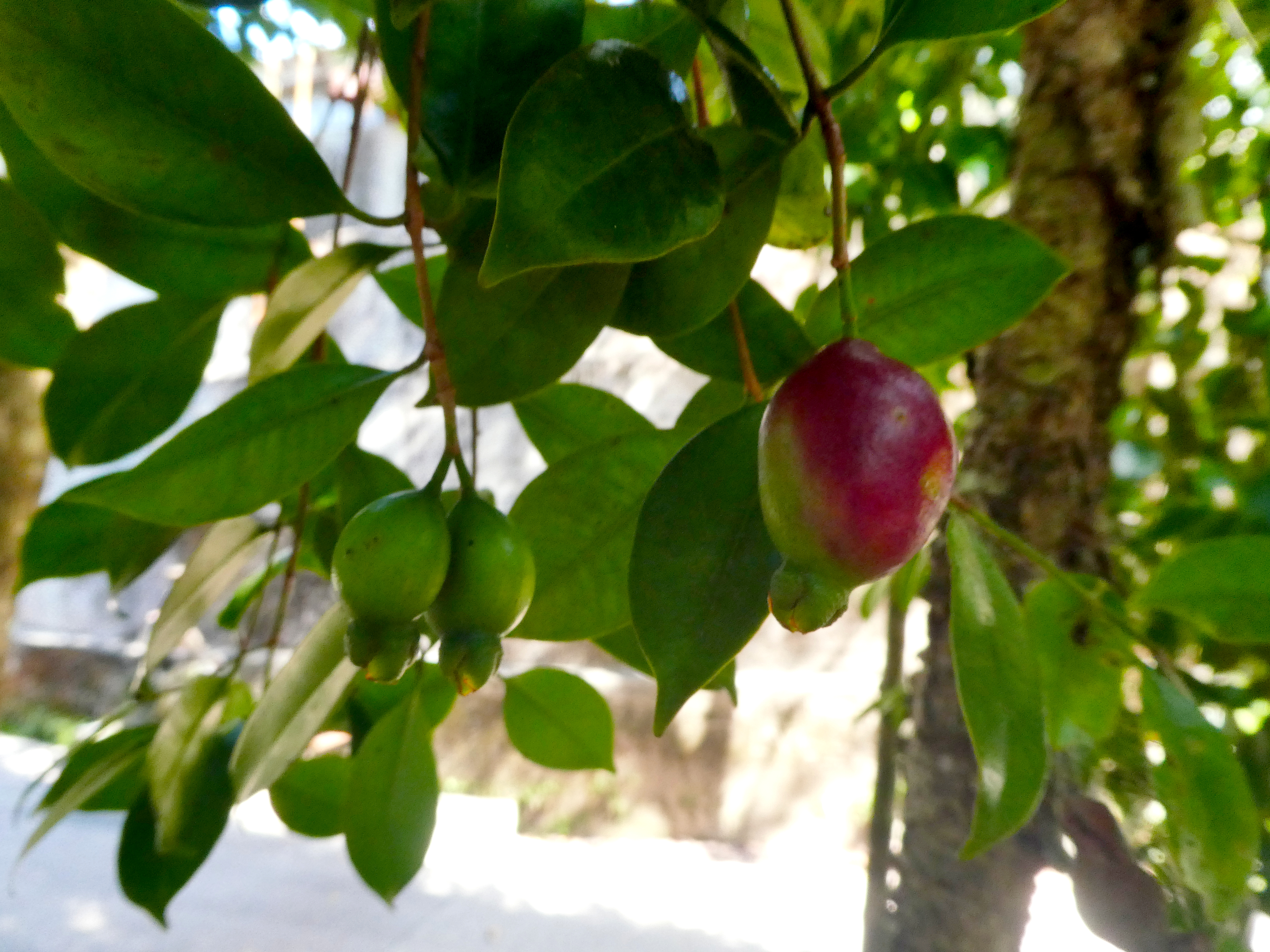
Fruit

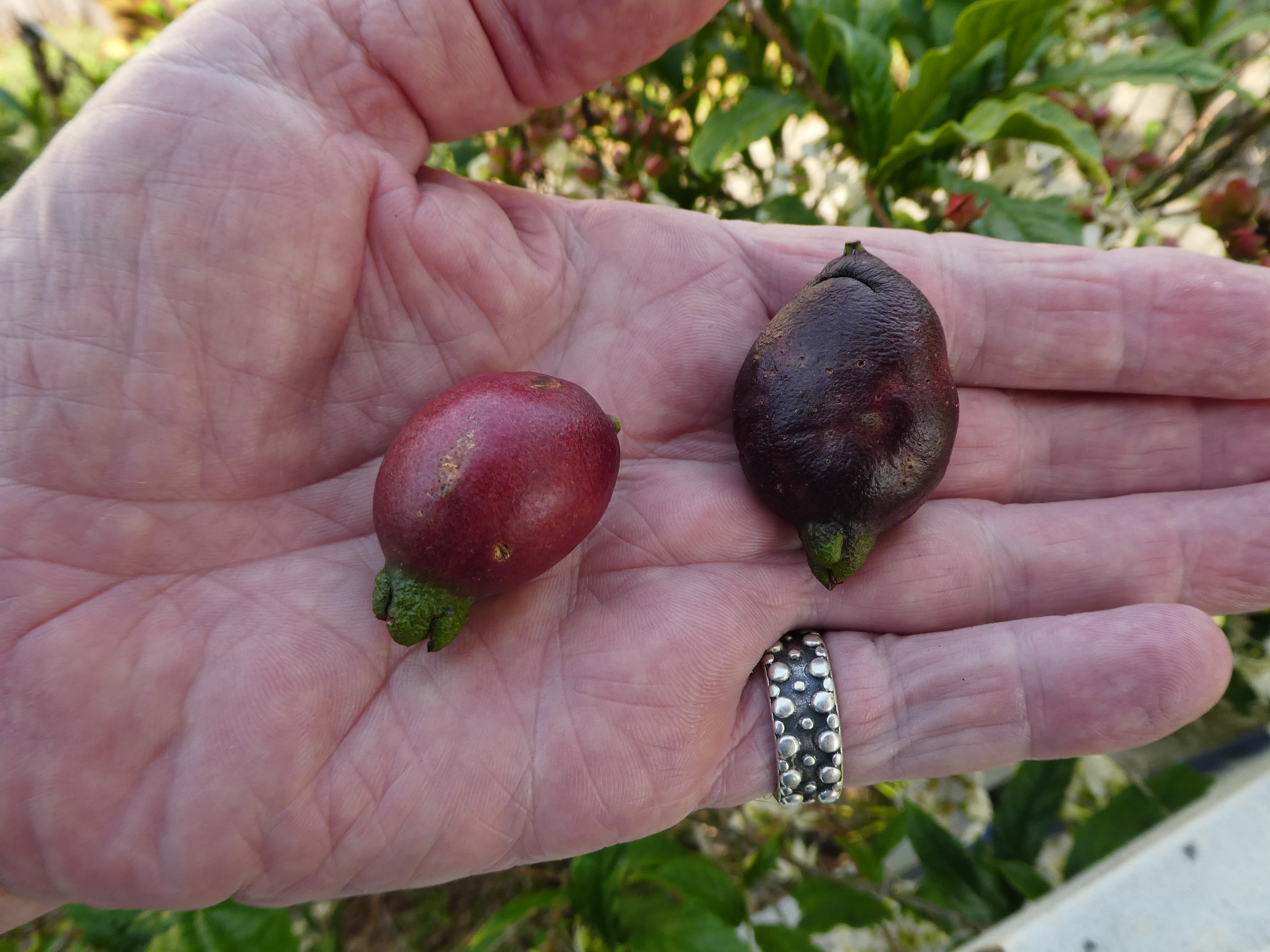
Fruit
