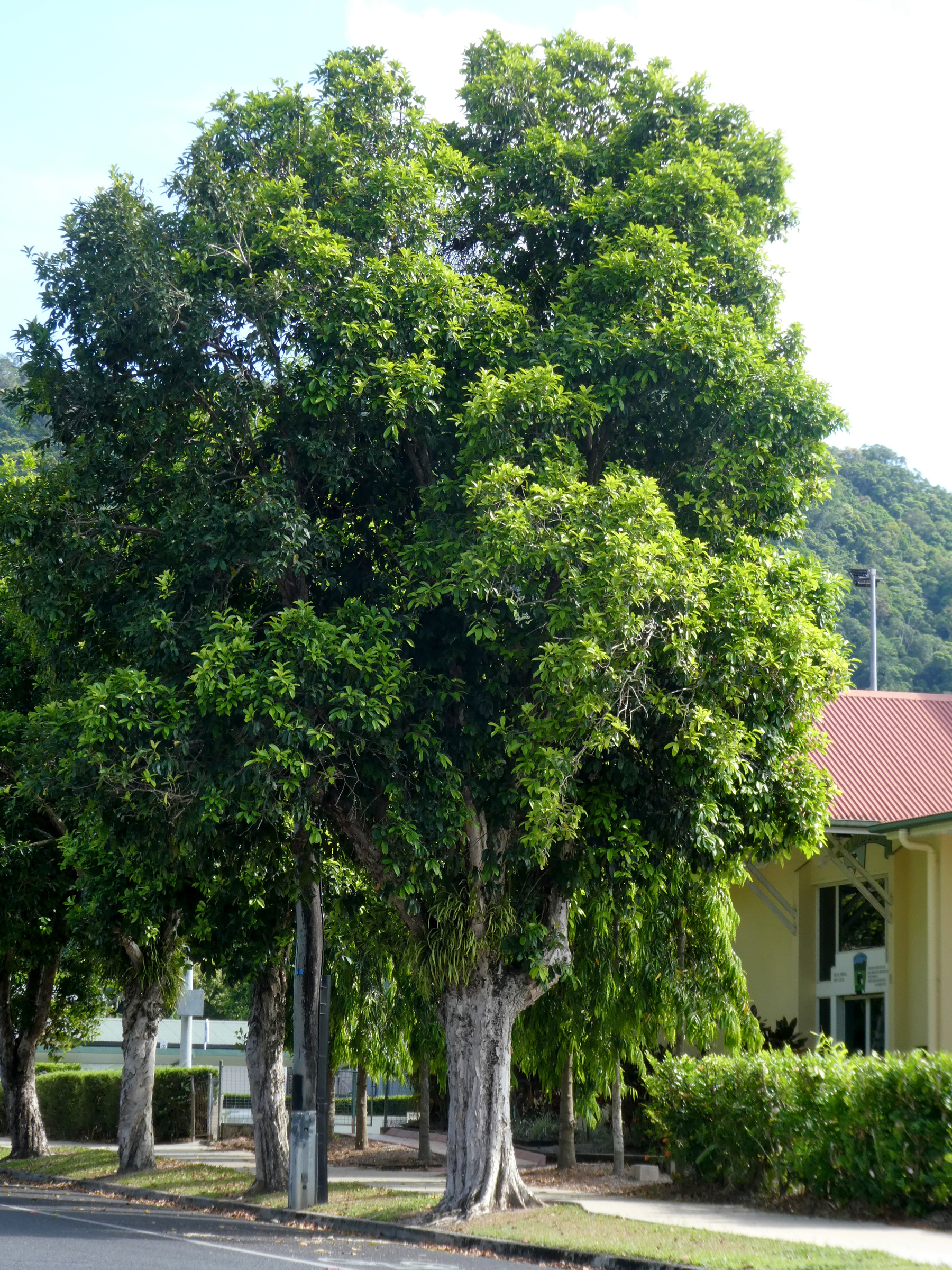
- Street planting in Cairns

Conservation status
- Least Concern (NCA)

Scientific classification
- Kingdom: Plantae
- Clade: Tracheophytes
- Clade: Angiosperms
- Clade: Eudicots
- Clade: Rosids
- Order: Myrtales
- Family: Myrtaceae
- Genus: Syzygium
- Species: S. alliiligneum

Binomial name
- Syzygium alliiligneum B.Hyland
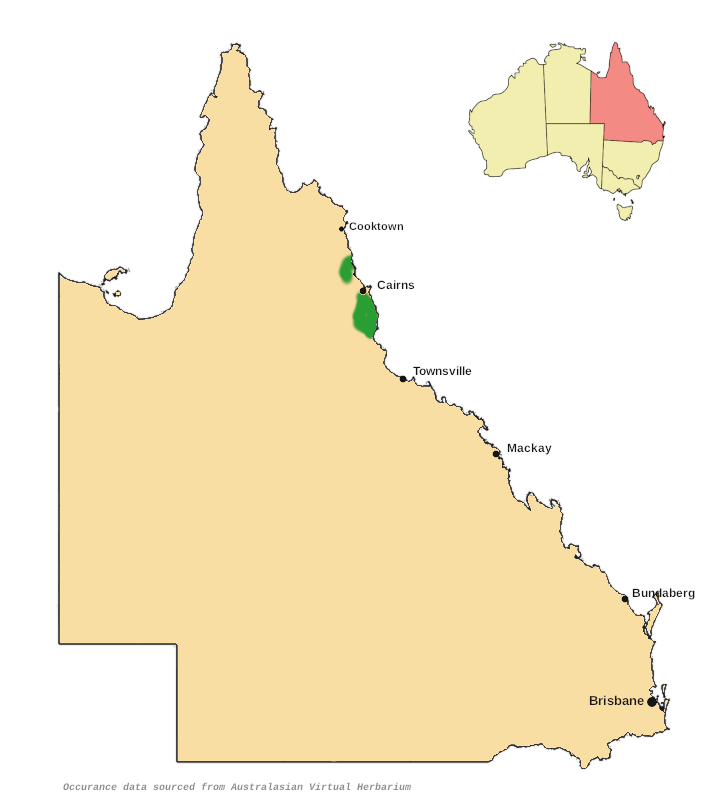

= Syzygium alliiligneum =

Onionwood

Species of plant in the myrtle family

Syzygium alliiligneum, commonly known as onionwood, Mission Beach satinash or bark in the wood is a species of plant in the family Myrtaceae. It is endemic to a small part of north eastern Queensland.

== Description ==
Syzygium alliiligneum is a large rainforest tree growing up to 35 m (115 ft) in height in natural forest habitats, but in cultivation may only reach 15 m (49 ft). The trunk may be fluted and may have buttresses, and the exposed bark is papery and usually pale grey, while newly-exposed bark is pale pink or orange.

The foliage is glossy, dark green above and lighter green below. Individual leaves are arranged in opposing pairs on the twigs and measure up to 12 by 6 cm (4.7 by 2.4 in). They are broadly elliptic to obovate with an acuminate tip.

Inflorescences are terminal or axillary panicles, produced from February to April, with white to cream flowers about 2 cm (0.8 in) across.

The fruits are more or less globular red to pink berries measuring up to 40 by 40 mm (1.6 by 1.6 in) containing a single large seed. They ripen from May to October.

== Taxonomy ==
This species was first formally described by Bernard "Bernie" Hyland and published in the Australian Journal of Botany in 1983. The holotype was collected by Hyland in 1972 beside the Palmerston Highway west of Innisfail.

=== Etymology ===
The genus name Syzygium comes from the Greek word syzgos, meaning "jointed" and is a reference to the paired leaves displayed by members of the genus. The species epithet alliiligneum is derived from the Latin allium, for "garlic", and lignum, for "wood". Cross-sections of the trunk shows onion-like rings of bark in the wood.

== Distribution and habitat ==
Syzygium alliiligneum is endemic to coastal rainforested areas of north east Queensland, from Cape Tribulation in the north to Tully in the south. It is mostly found from sea level up to around 350 m (1,150 ft), and occasionally up to 700 m (2,300 ft).

== Ecology ==
The fruits of onionwood are eaten by cassowaries, who are probably the only dispersal agent for the species. They are also edible by humans, although sour.

== Conservation ==
This species is listed by the Queensland Department of Environment and Science as least concern. As of 27 April 2024, it has not been assessed by the IUCN.

== Cultivation ==
About 60 onionwood trees have been planted across Cairns as street trees.

== Gallery ==
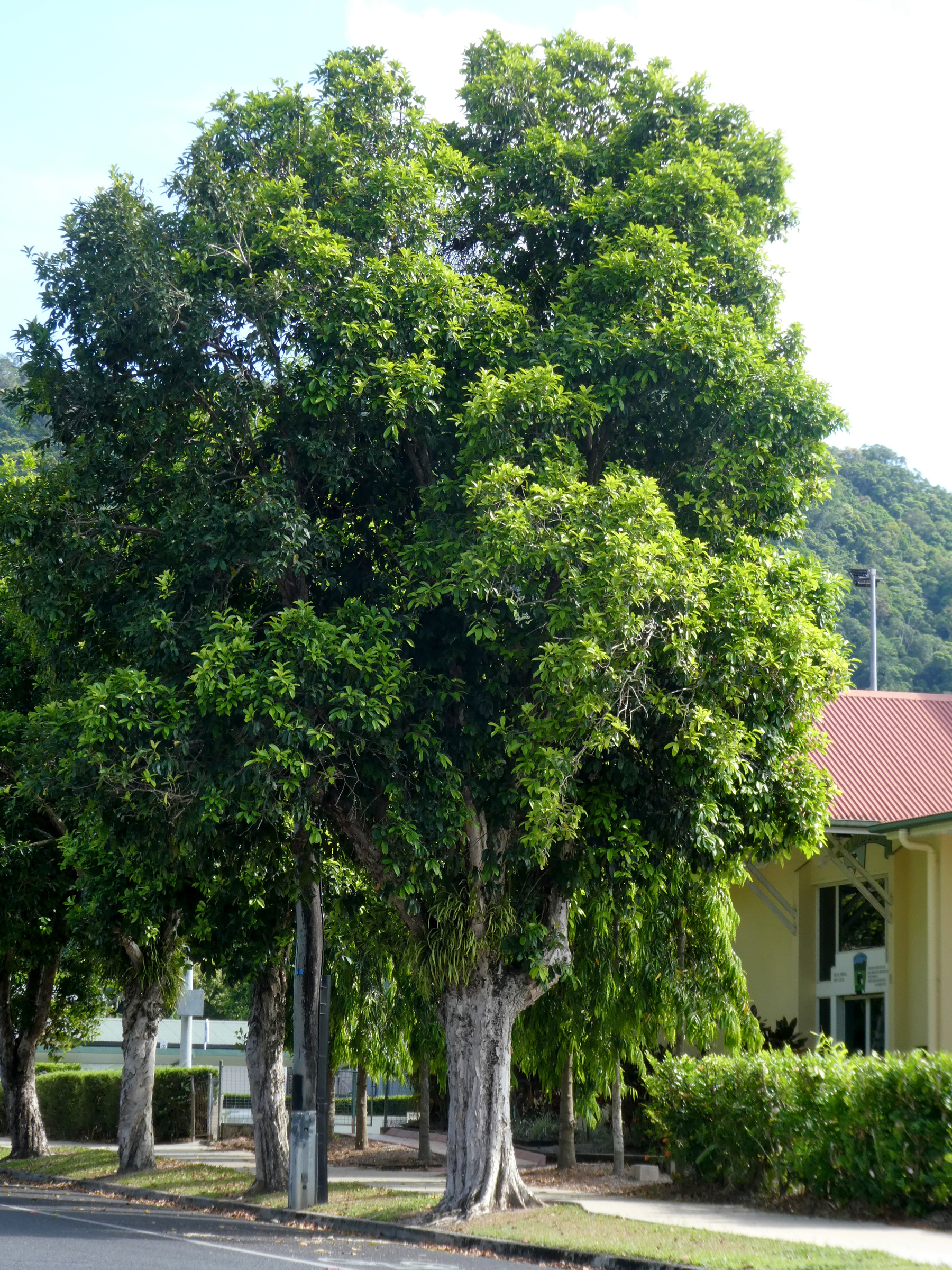
Street tree in Cairns

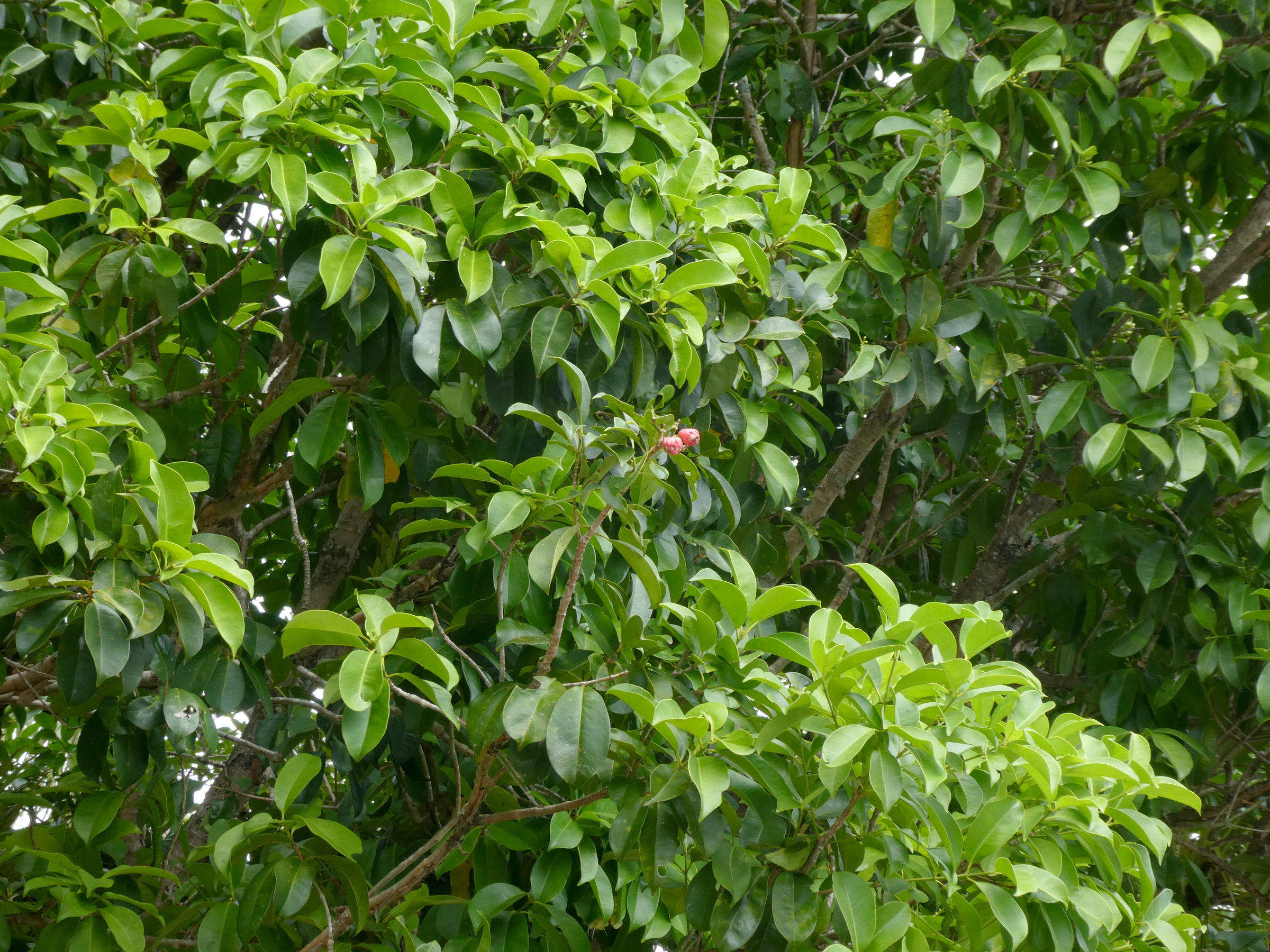
Foliage

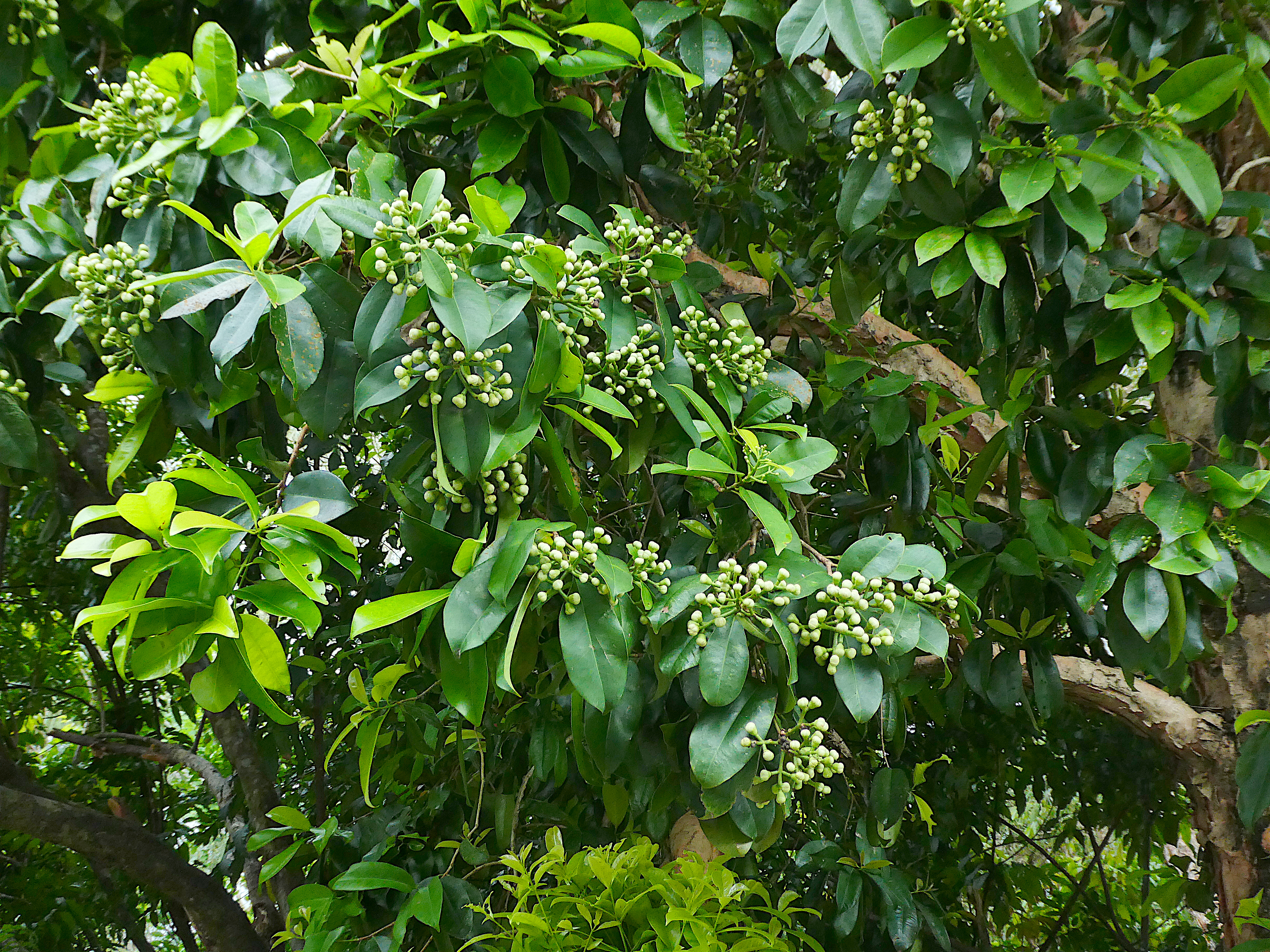
Flower buds and foliage

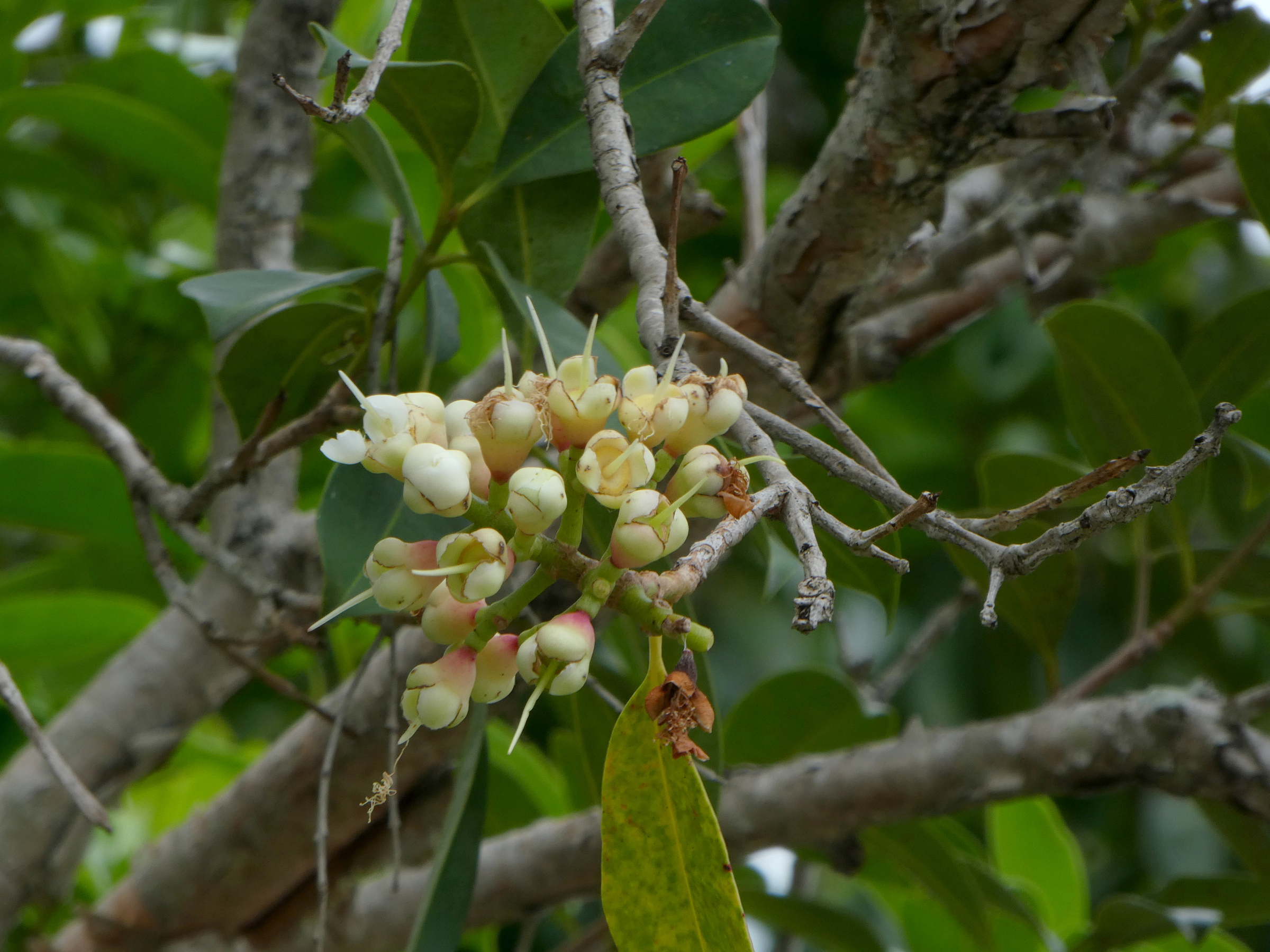
Fruit beginning to develop just after flowering

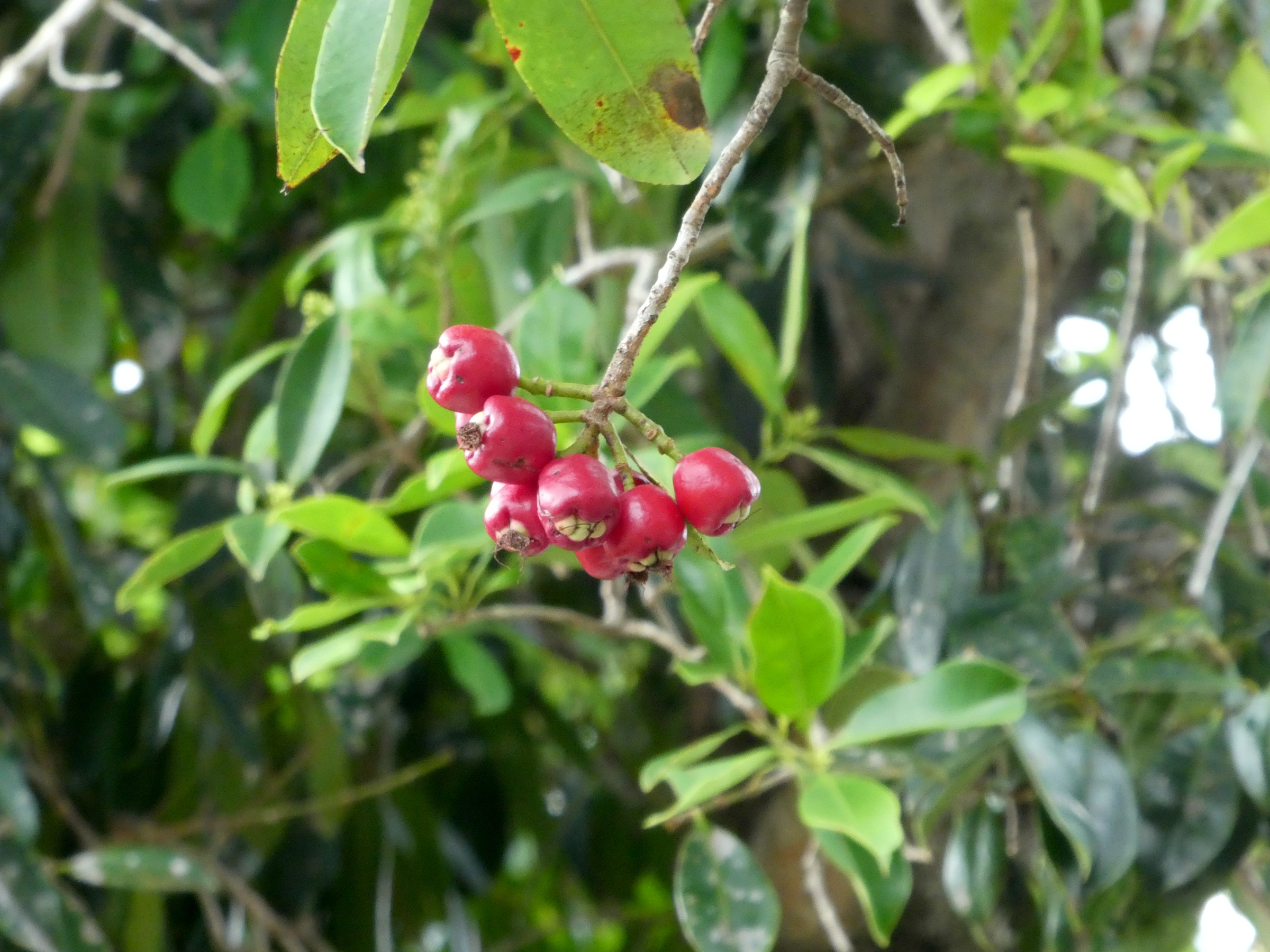
Ripe fruit
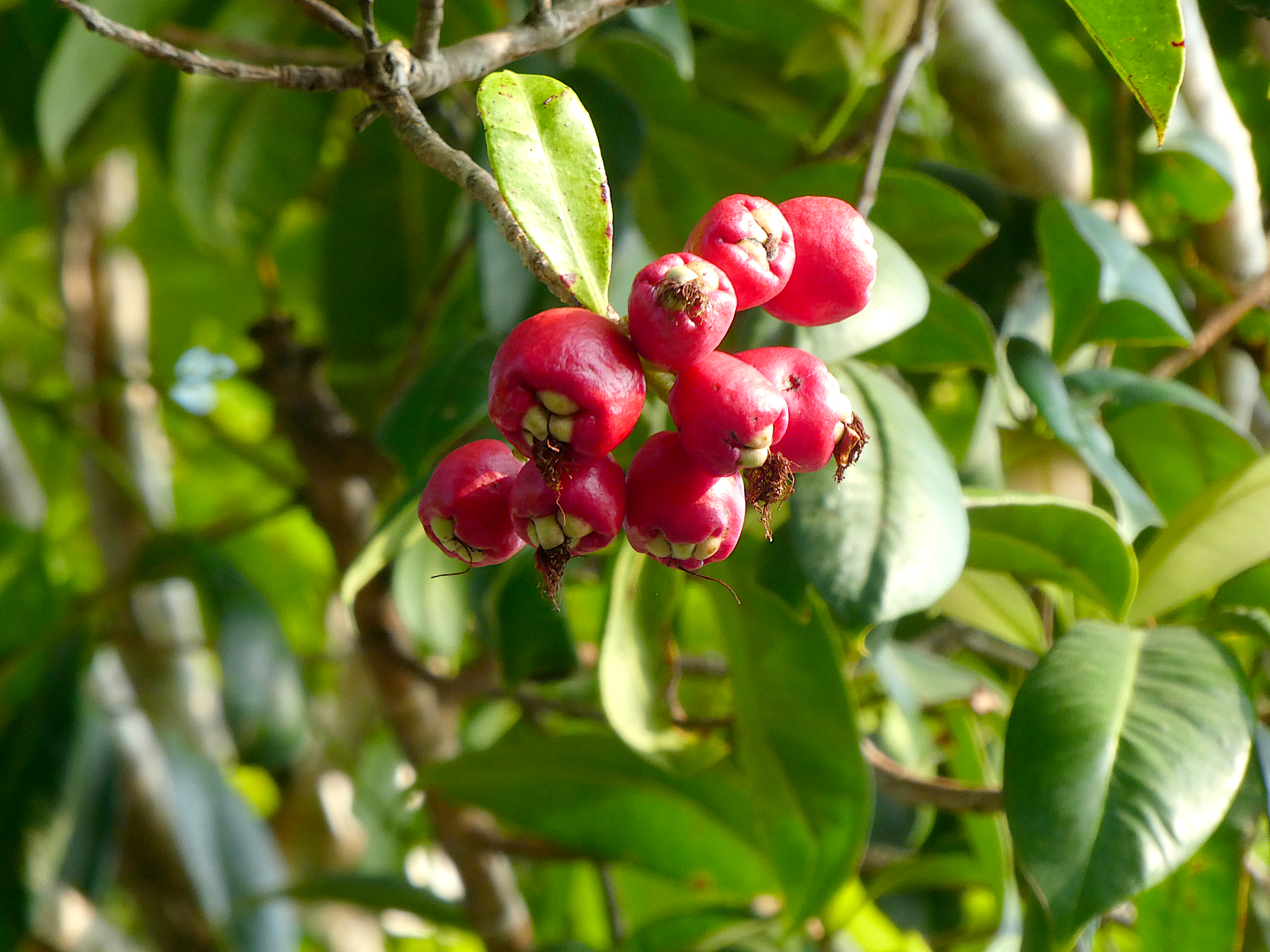
Ripe fruit

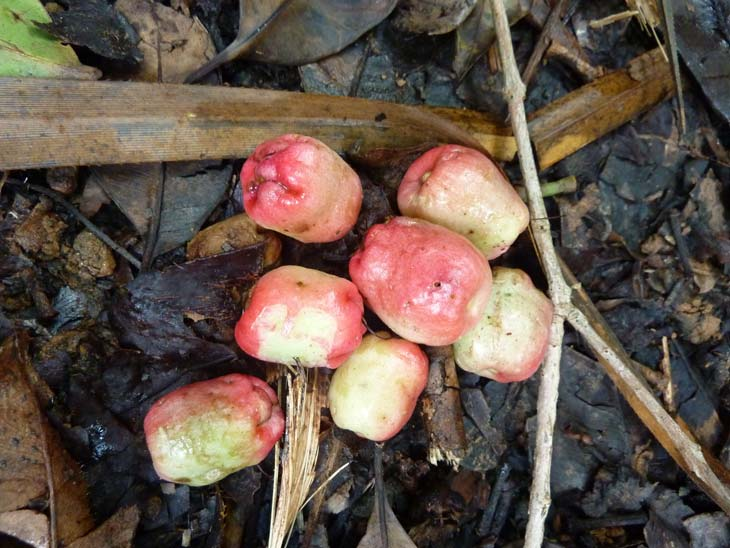
Fallen fruit

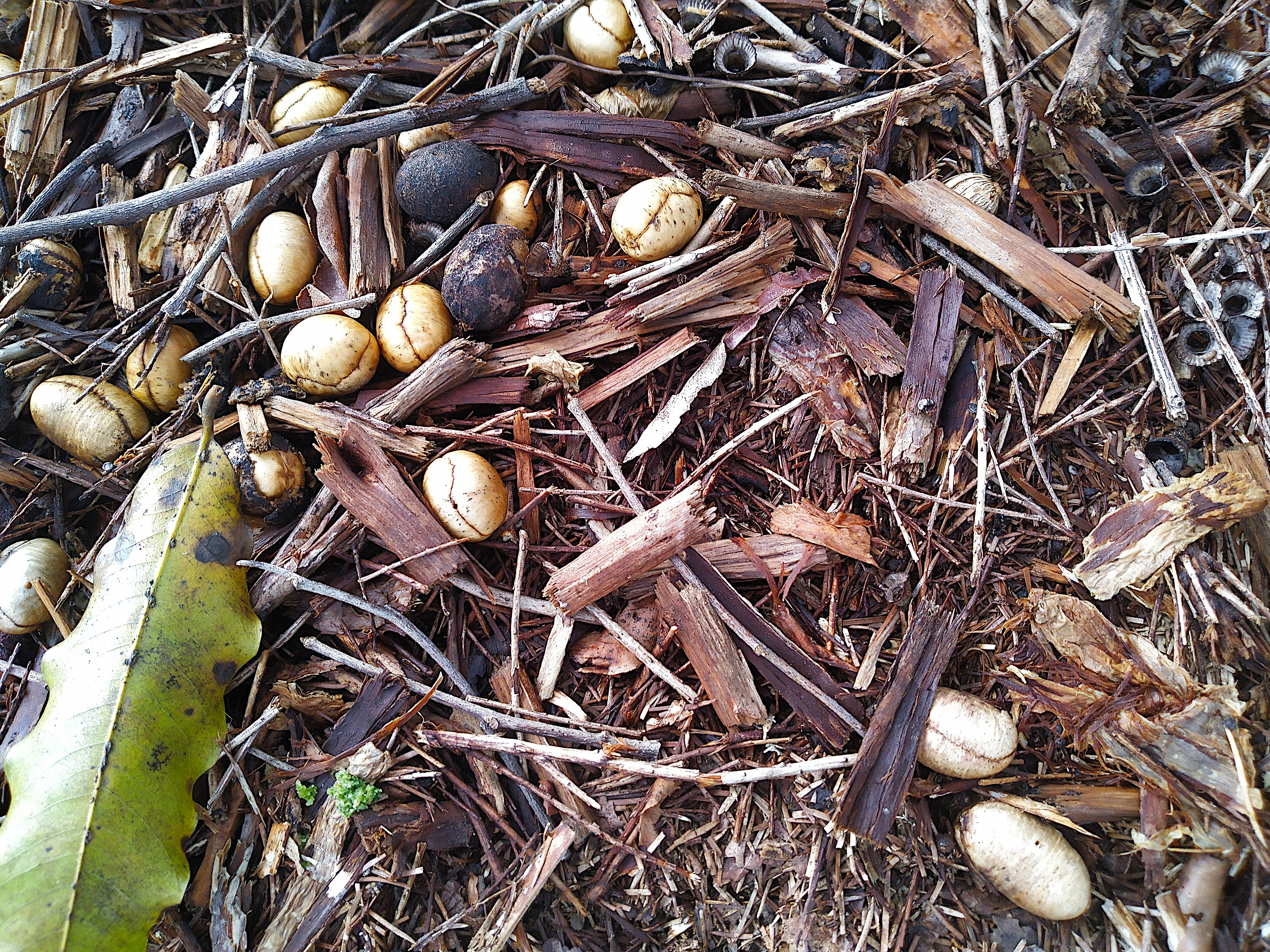
Seeds

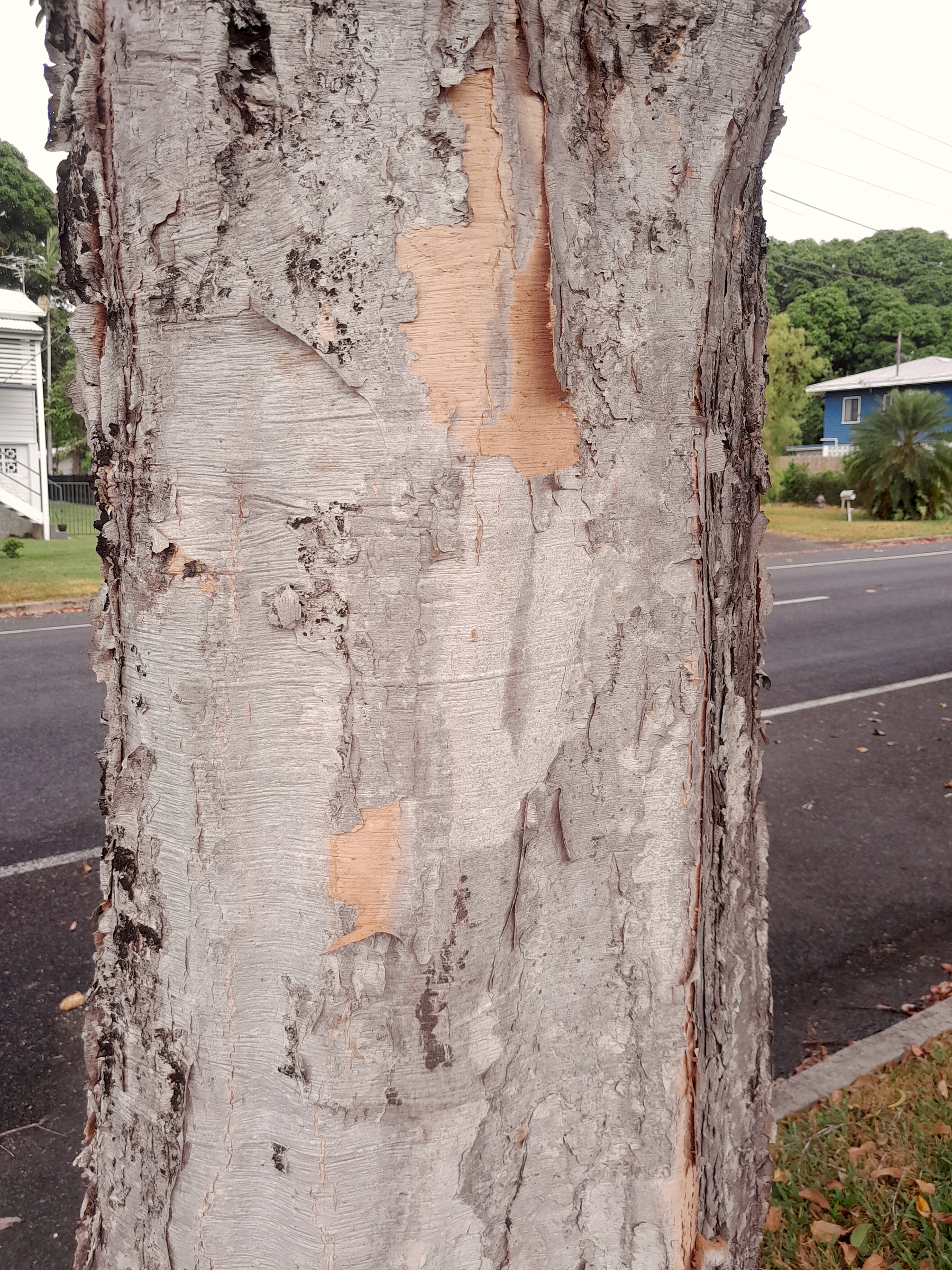
Trunk with papery bark

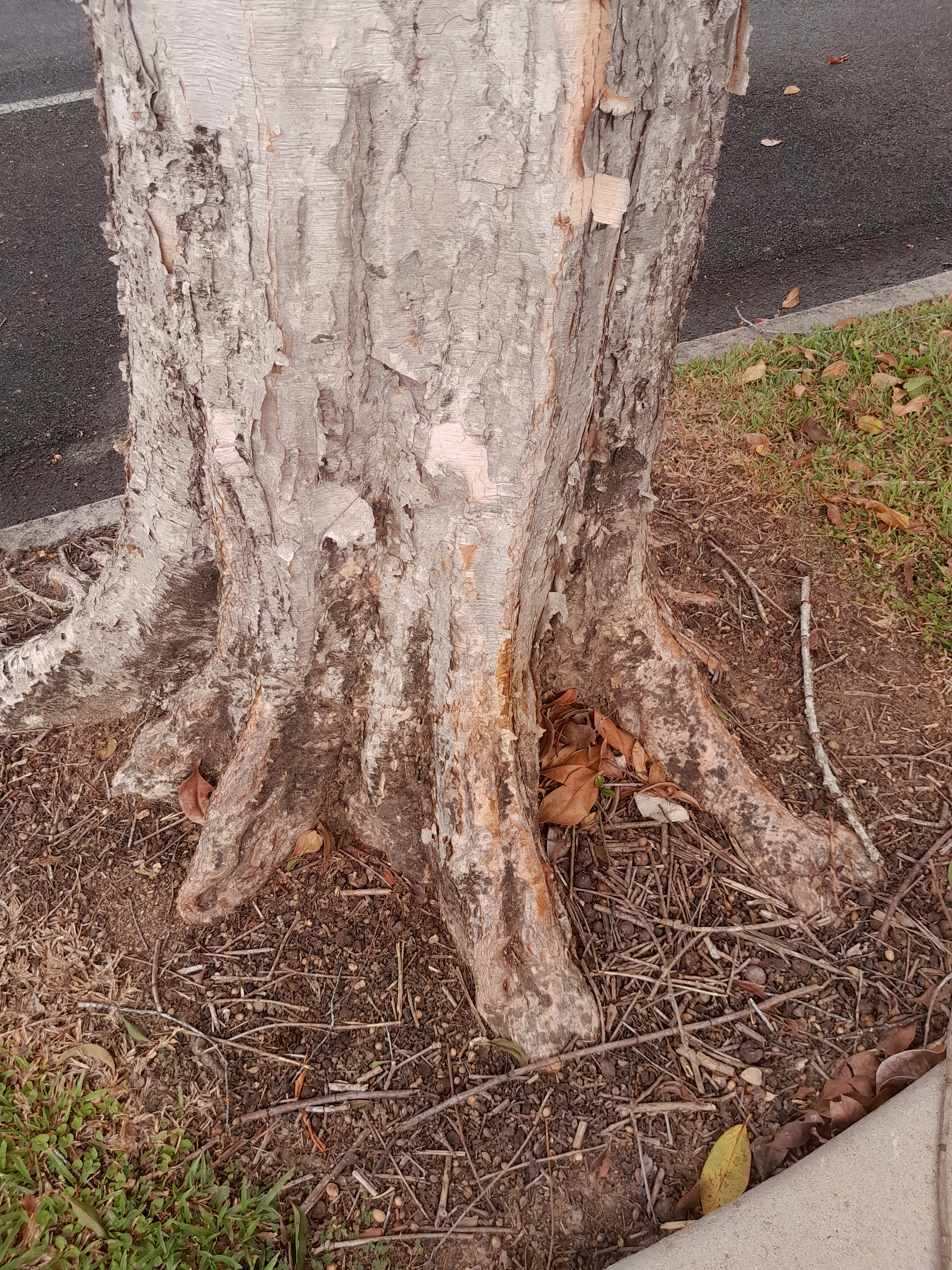
Small buttresses
