= Polychrome =

Art terminology and color method

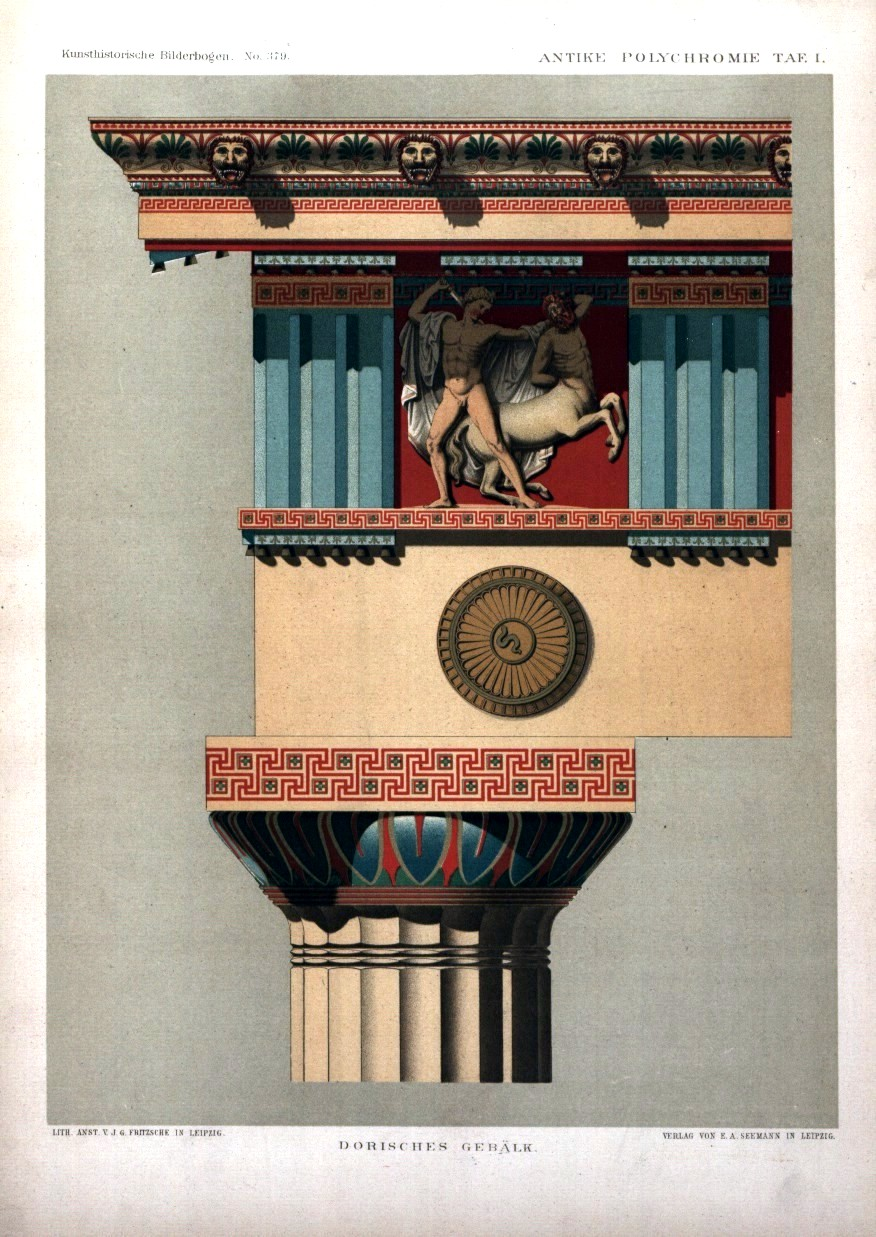
1883 reconstruction of color scheme of the entablature on a Doric temple

Polychrome is the "practice of decorating architectural elements, sculpture, etc., in a variety of colors." The term is used to refer to certain styles of architecture, pottery, or sculpture in multiple colors.

When looking at artworks and architecture from antiquity and the European Middle Ages, people tend to believe that they were monochrome. In reality, the pre-Renaissance past was full of colour, and Greco-Roman sculptures and Gothic cathedrals, that are now white, beige, or grey, were initially painted in a variety of colours. As André Malraux stated: "Athens was never white but her statues, bereft of color, have conditioned the artistic sensibilities of Europe [...] the whole past has reached us colorless." Polychrome was and is a practice not limited only to the Western world. Non-Western artworks, such as Chinese temples, Oceanian Uli figures, or Maya ceramic vases, were also decorated with multiple colours.

== Prehistory ==
Prehistory is generally referred to as the period of human history before the beginning of recorded history. Throughout this period many polychrome artworks were made. The most common forms of polychrome art which survive today are paintings, pottery, and sculpture. As systems of writing developed differently between cultures, when recorded history starts and prehistory ends varies between them.

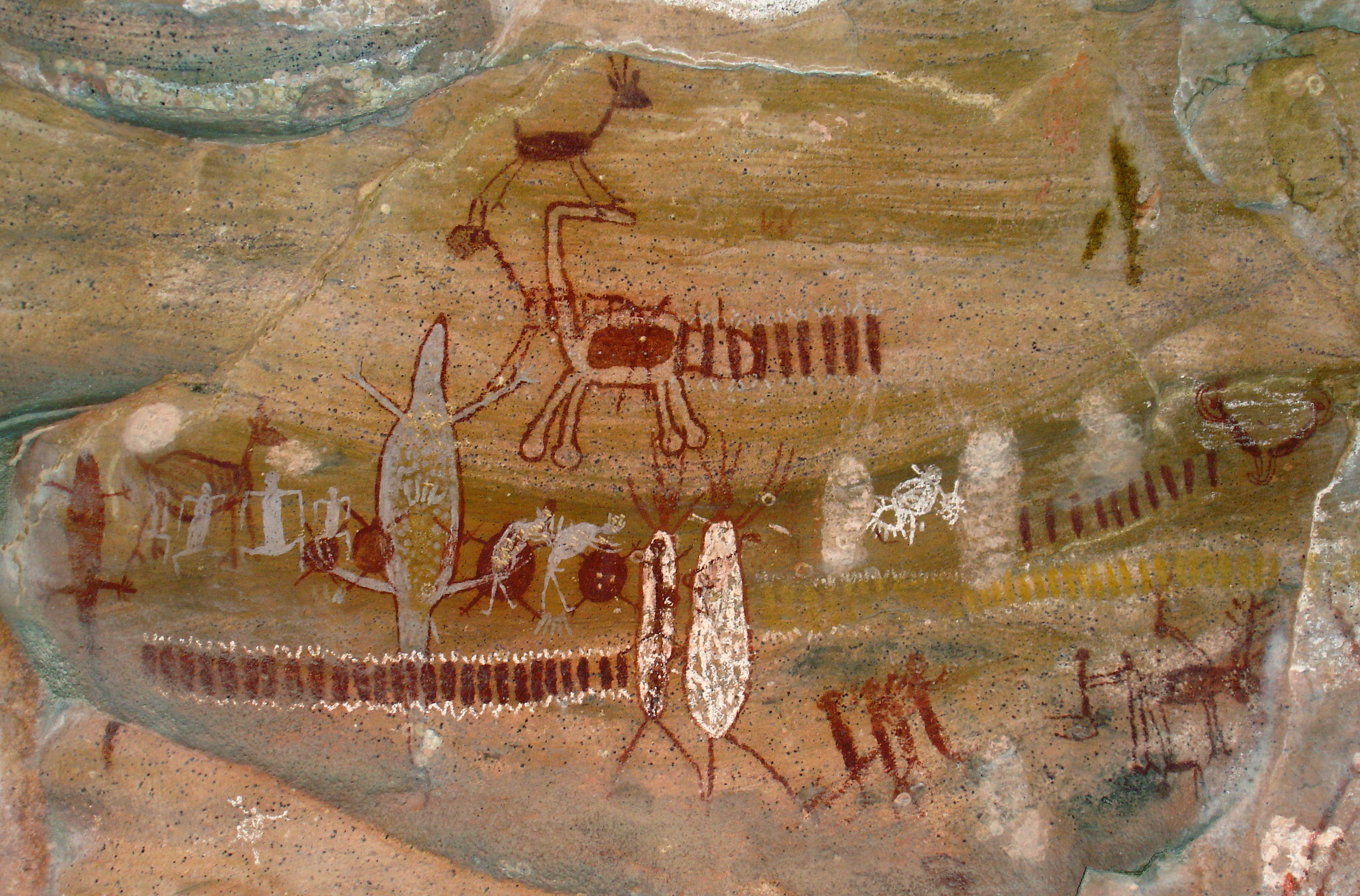
Cave painting at Serra da Capivara National Park, Brazil, depicting humans and animals, about 20,000 BP

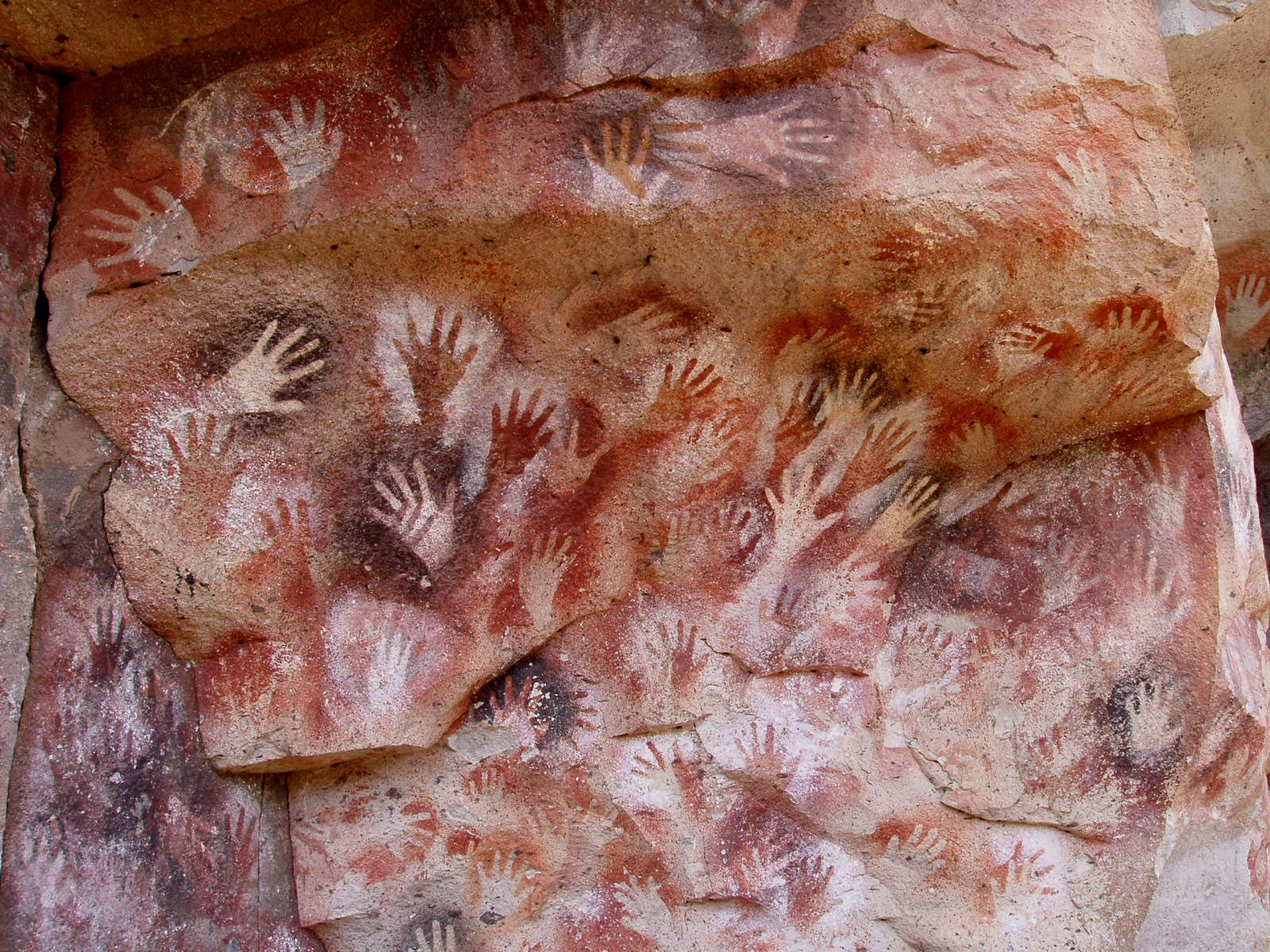
Stencils of hands at the Cueva de las Manos, Argentina, dated to either 7,300 BC to 700 AD or 13,000–9,000 BP

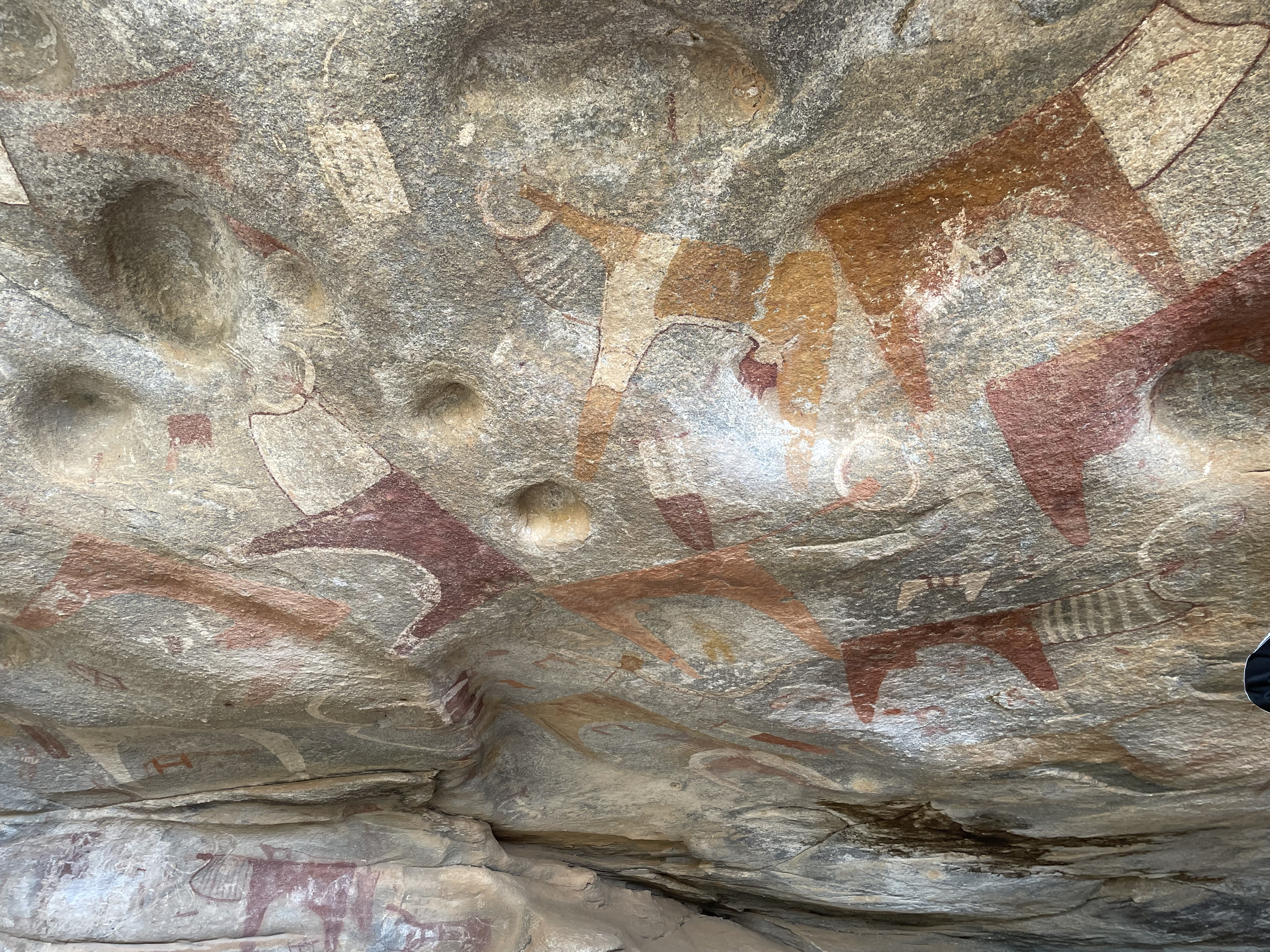
Cave paintings of Laas Geel, Somaliland, depicting cattle, mid-4th millennium to mid-3rd millennium BC

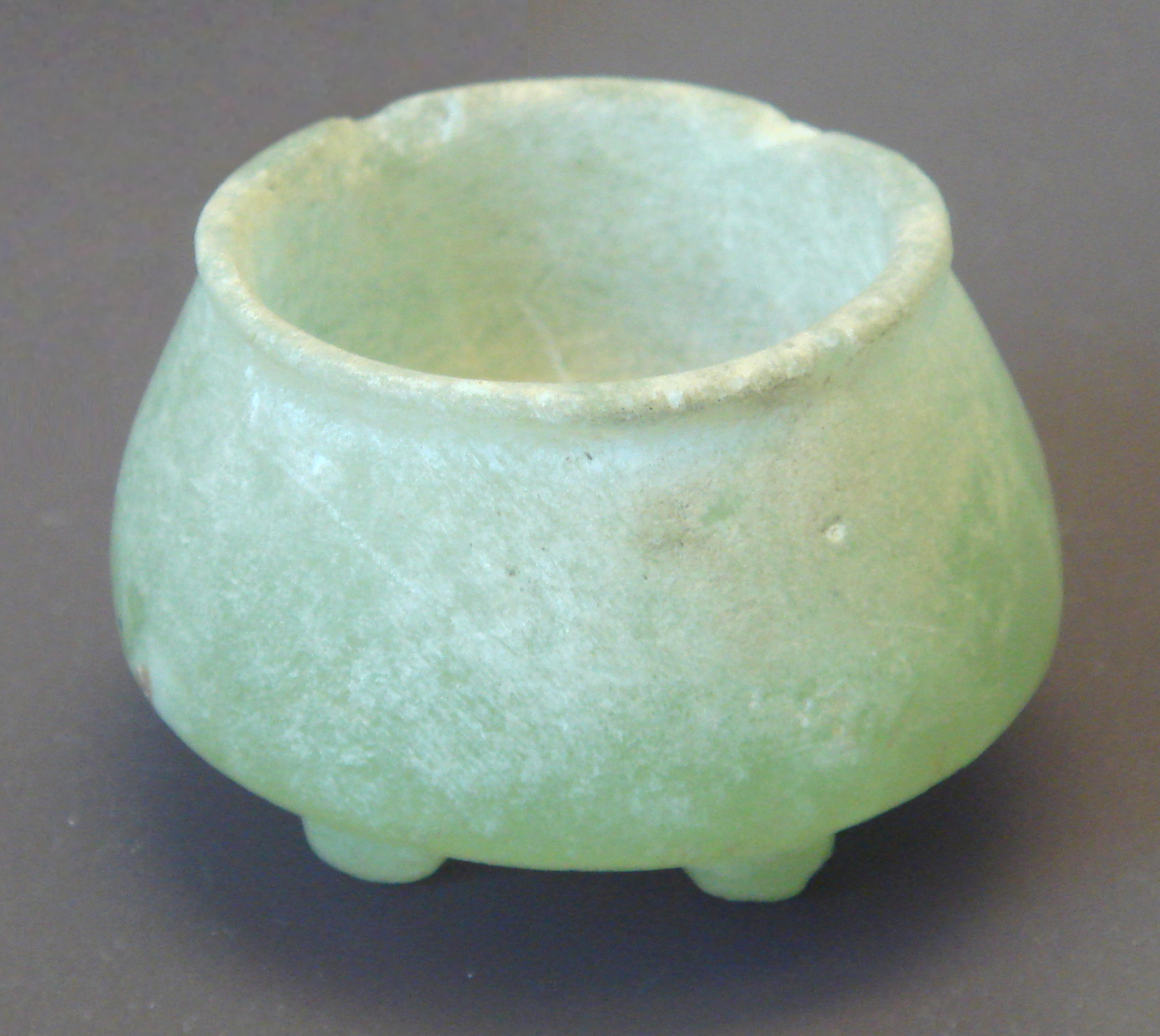
Green aragonite tripod vase, mid-Euphrates region, 6,000 BC, Louvre

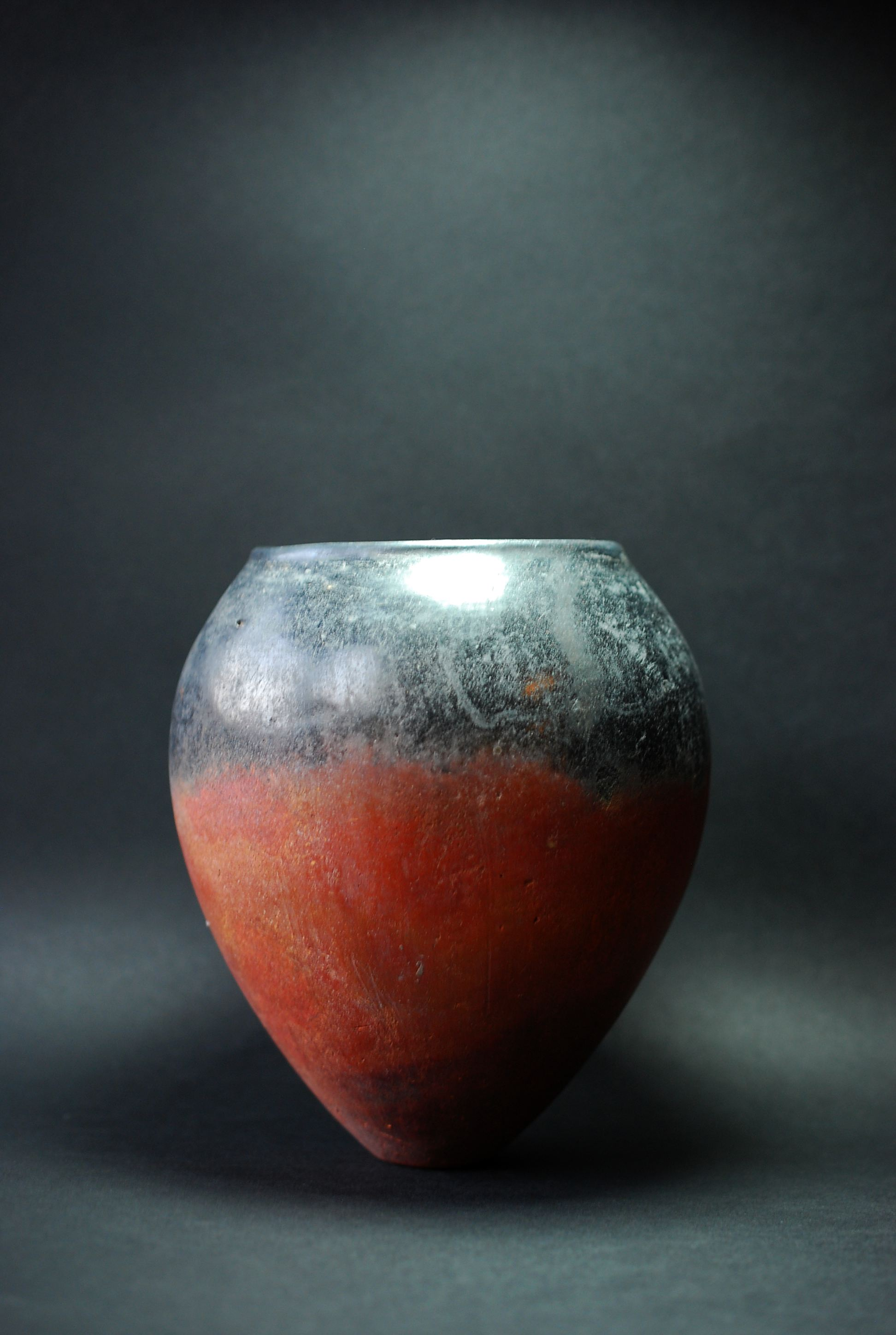
Ovoid Naqada I (Amratian) black-topped terracotta vase, c. 3800–3500 BC

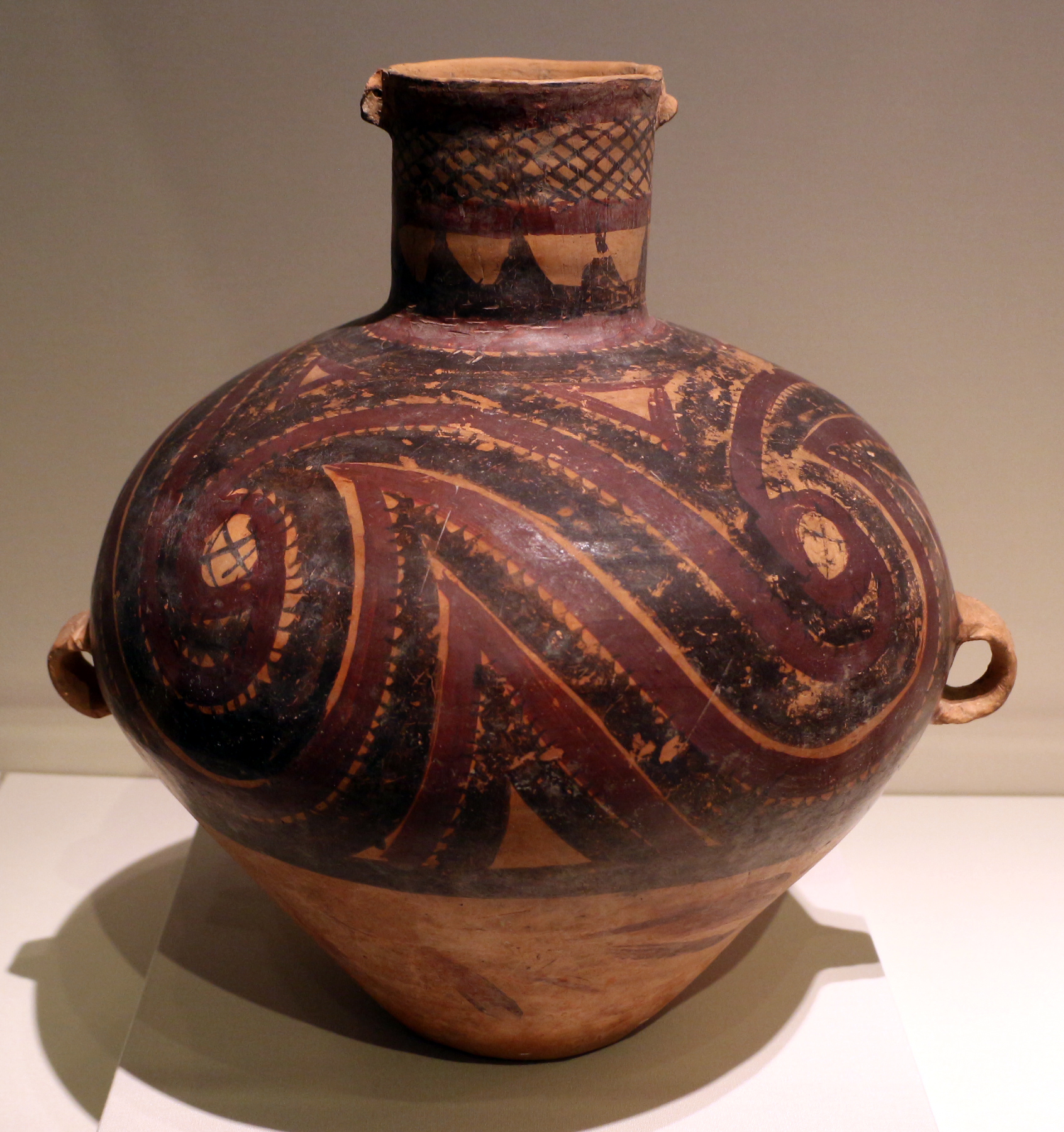
Jar with curvilinear design, Banshan, China, c. 2650–2350 BC, Cleveland Museum of Art

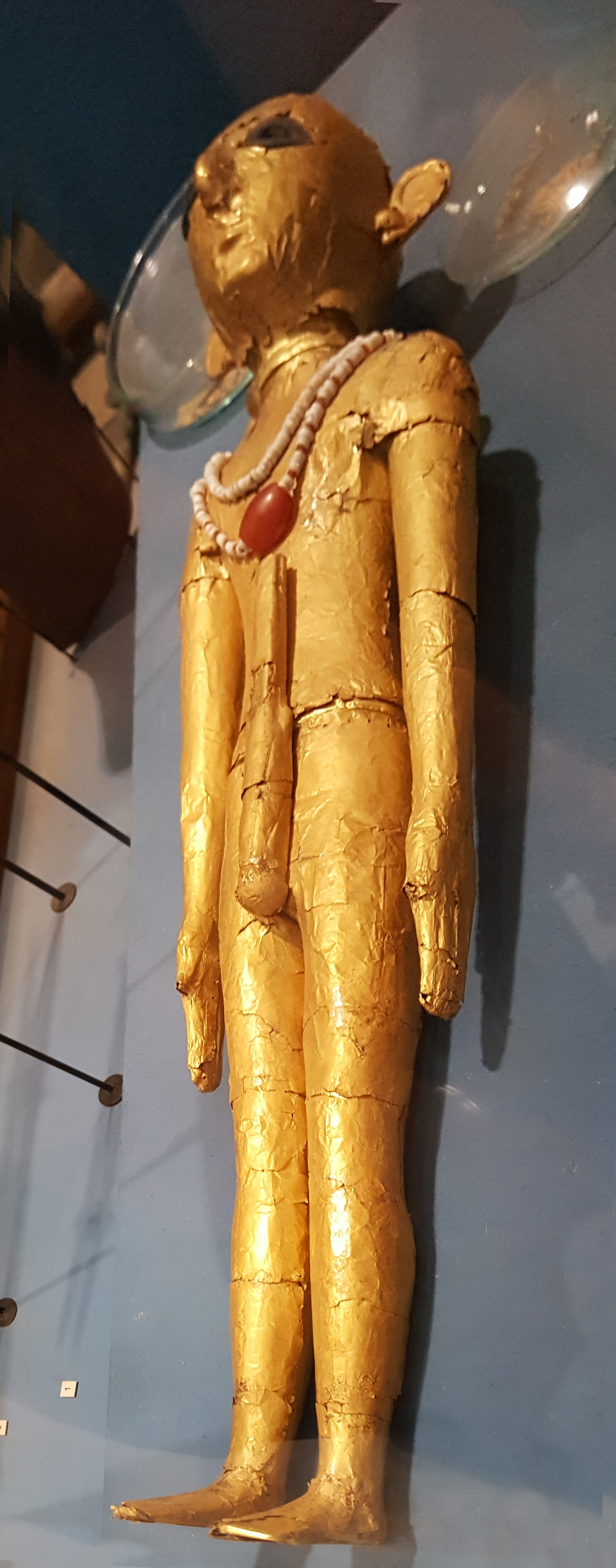
Gold statuette from Tell el-Farkha, Naqada IIIB, one of the oldest known representations of Ancient Egyptian rulers, c. 3200–3000 BC

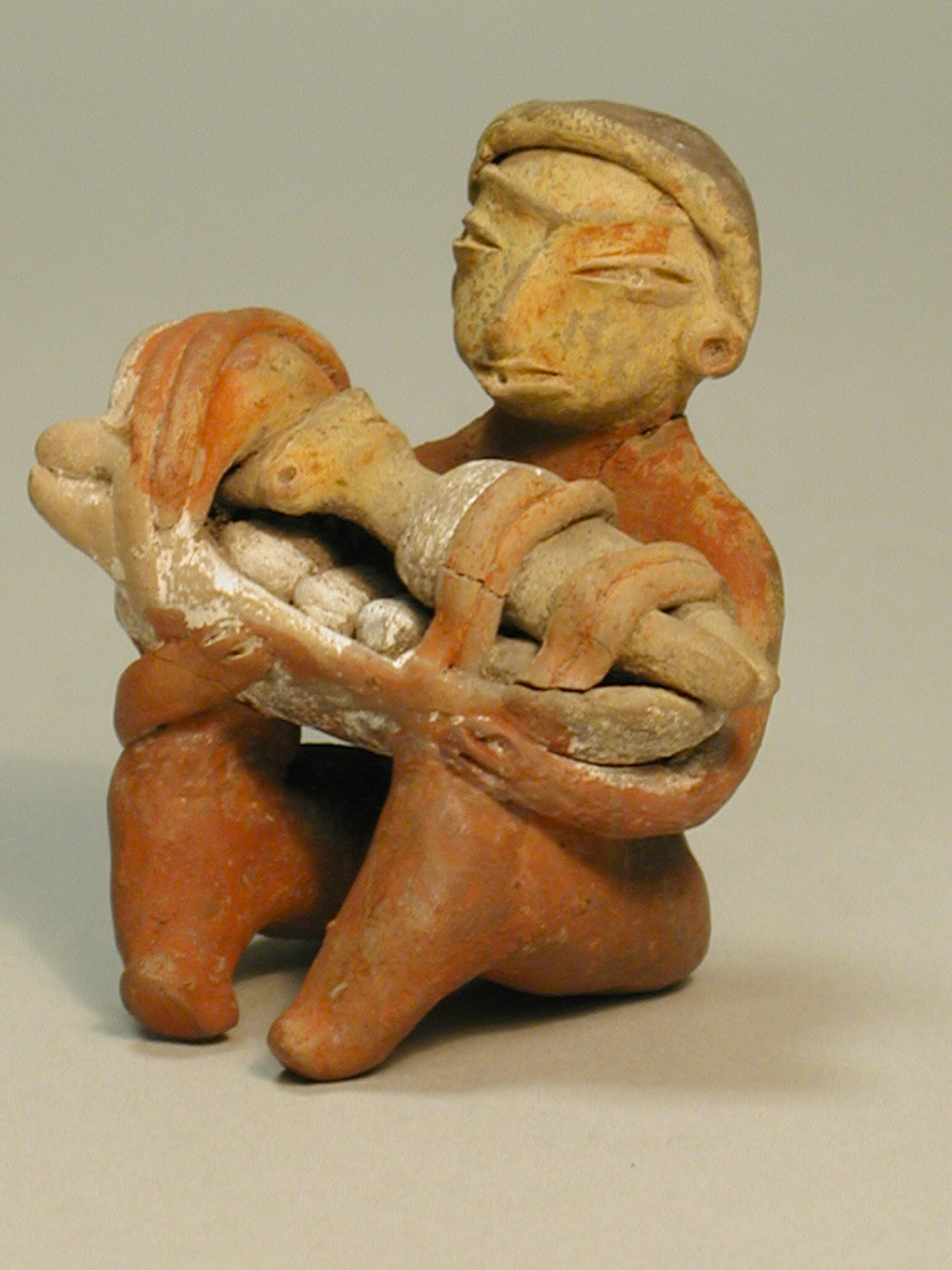
Tlatilco figurine of a mother and child, ceramic, 12th-9th century BC

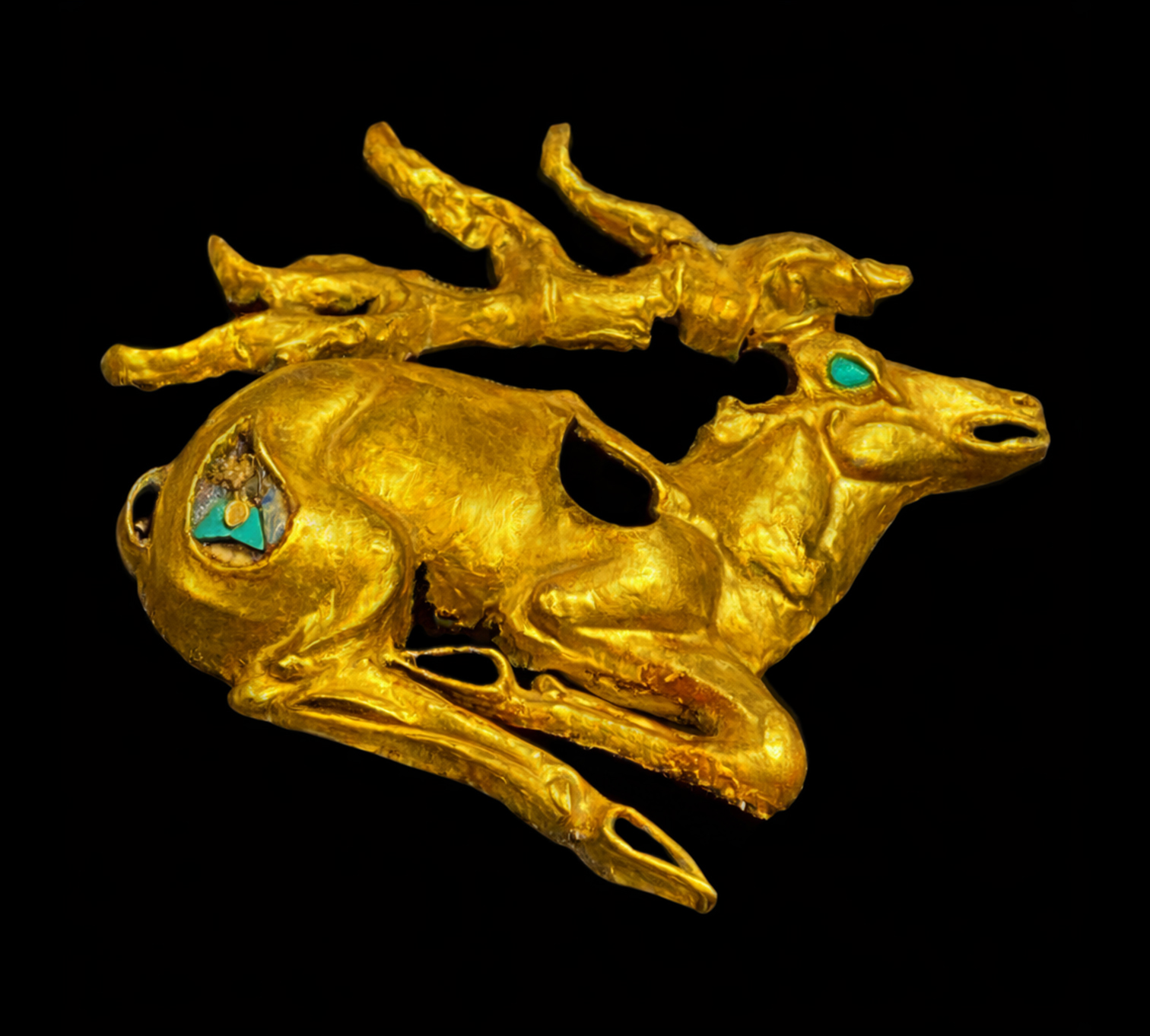
Saka recumbent stag plaque, Eleke Sazy, Kazakhstan, 8th to 6th century BC

== Ancient Near East ==
Similarly to the ancient art of other regions, Ancient Near Eastern art was polychrome, bright colours being often present. Many sculptures no longer have their original colouring today, but there are still examples that keep it. One of the best is the Ishtar Gate, the eighth gate to the inner city of Babylon (in the area of present-day Hillah, Babil Governorate, Iraq). It was constructed in c. 575 BC by the order of King Nebuchadnezzar II on the north side of the city. It was part of a grand walled processional way leading into the city. Its colours are as rich as they were back in the day because the walls were made of glazed brick.

Many Ancient Near Eastern sculptures were painted too. As an example, although most are now the colour of the stone, all the Assyrian reliefs that decorated royal palaces were painted in highly saturated colours.

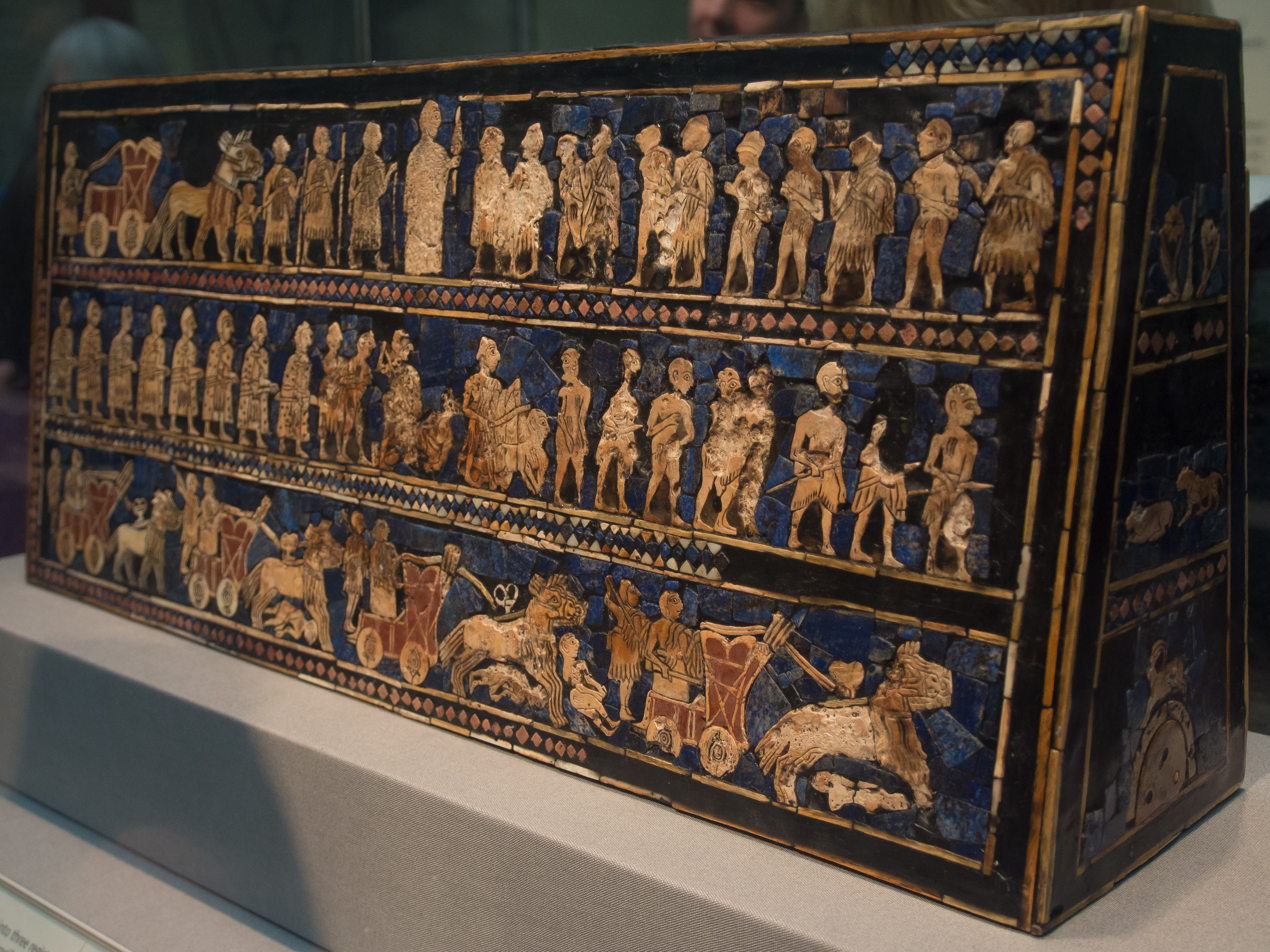
"War side" of the Standard of Ur, 2600–2400 BC, shell, red limestone and lapis lazuli on wood, length: 49.5 cm, from the Royal Cemetery at Ur, British Museum

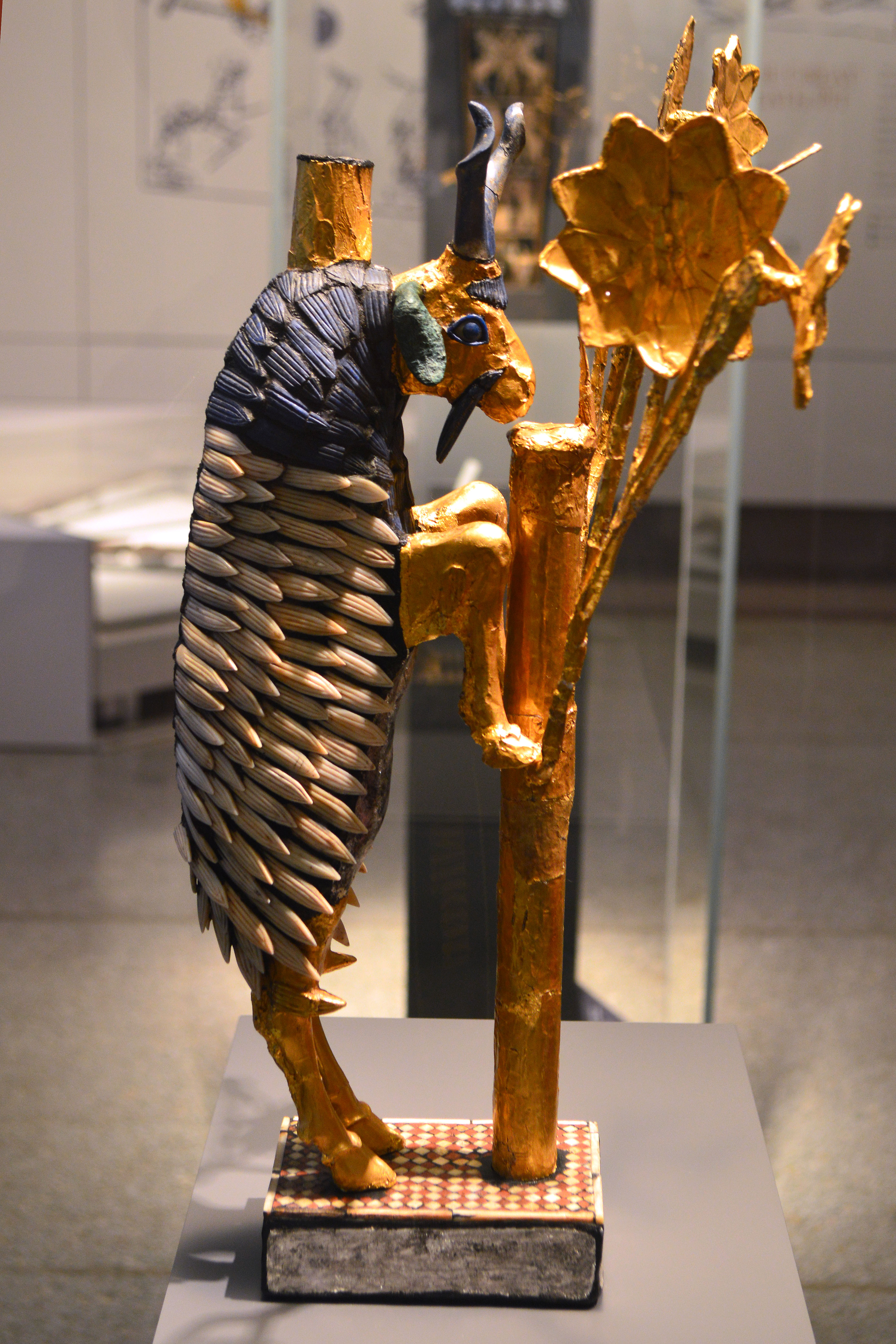
One of the Ram in a Thicket, 2600-2400 BC, gold, copper, shell, limestone and lapis lazuli, also from the Royal Cemetery at Ur, University of Pennsylvania

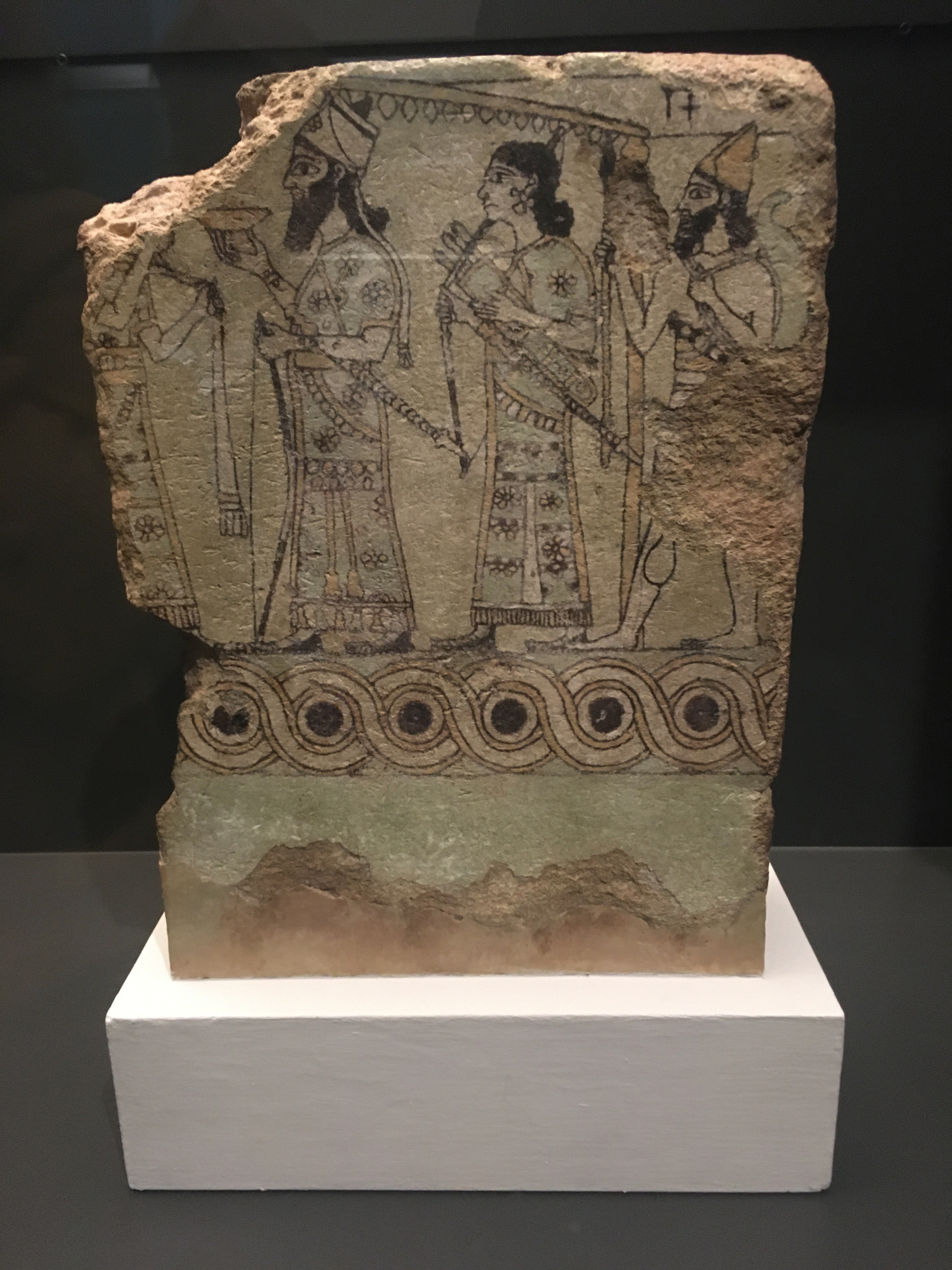
Assyrian tile with a guilloche border from the North-West Palace at Nimrud (now in modern Iraq), 883–859 BC, glazed earthenware, British Museum, London

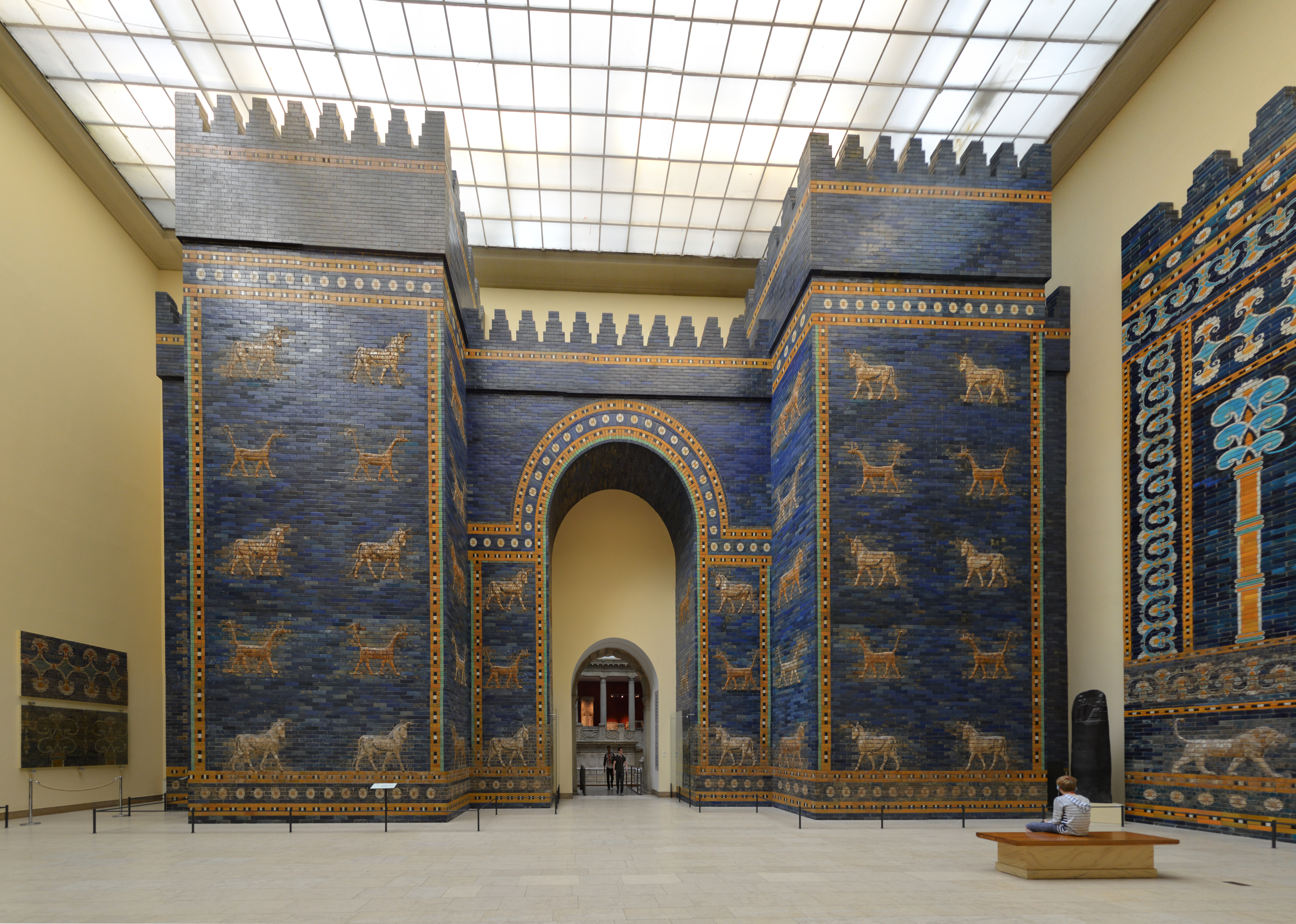
Reconstruction of the Ishtar Gate, c. 605 – c. 539 BC, glazed bricks, Pergamon Museum

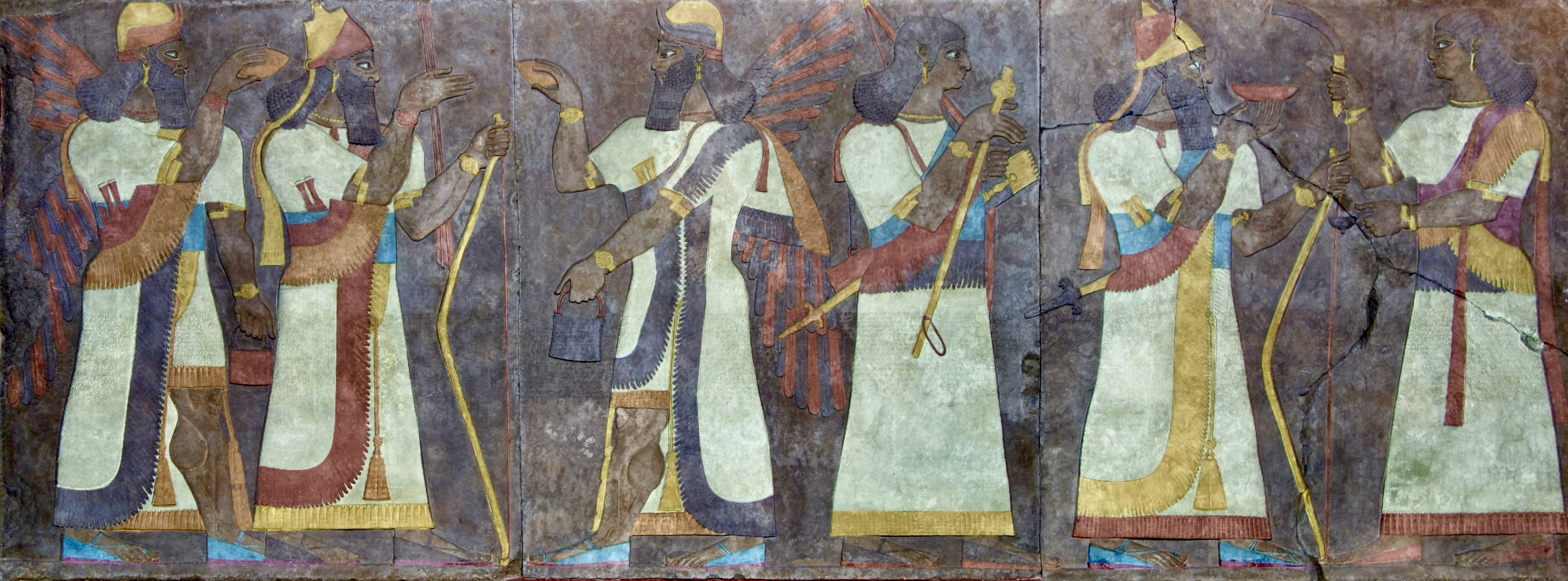
Assyrian panel with color projected on it, showing how it looked initially, in the Pergamon Museum. The color disappeared in many millennia and was damaged by the excessive cleaning of artifacts that took place in the 19th century

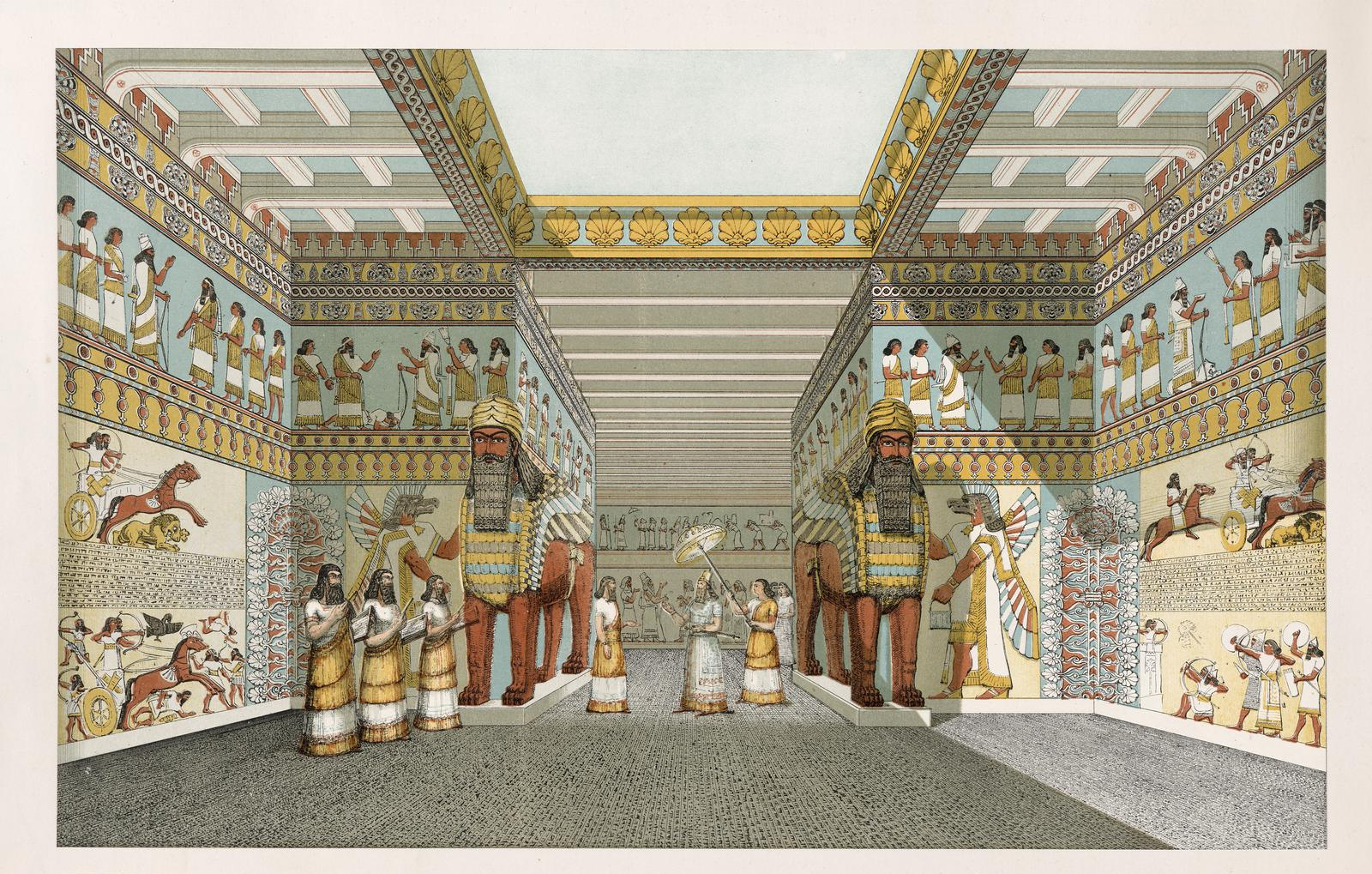
Reconstruction of a hall from an Assyrian palace, by Sir Austen Henry Layard, 1849

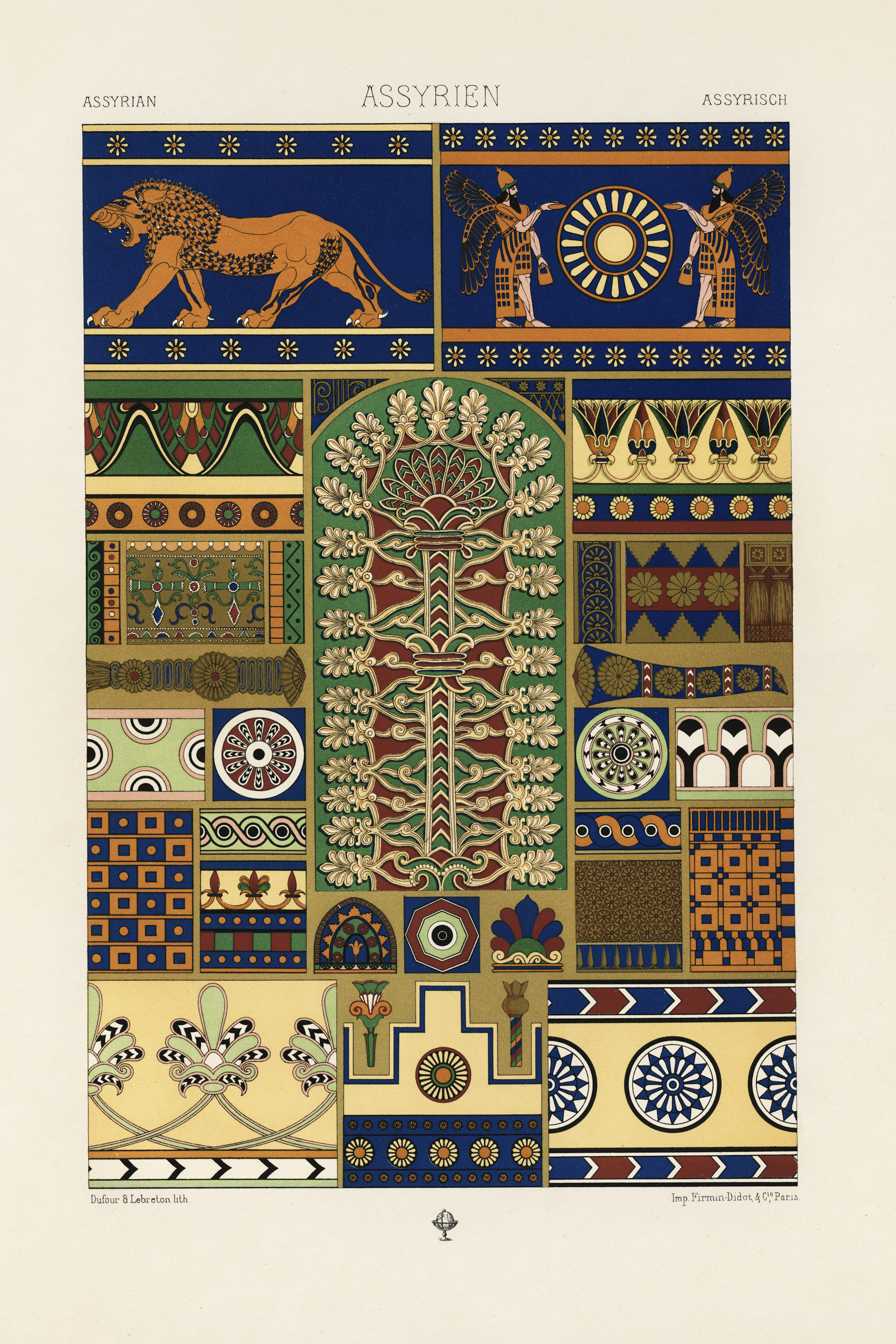
Assyrian patterns and motifs from L'Ornement Polychrome, by Albert Racinet, 1888

== Ancient Egypt ==
Thanks to the dry climate of Egypt, the original colours of many ancient sculptures in round, reliefs, paintings, and various objects were well preserved. Some of the best preserved examples of ancient Egyptian architecture were the tombs, covered inside with sculpted reliefs painted in bright colours or just frescos. Egyptian artists primarily worked in black, red, yellow, brown, blue, and green pigments. These colours were derived from ground minerals, synthetic materials (Egyptian blue, Egyptian green, and frits used to make glass and ceramic glazes), and carbon-based blacks (soot and charcoal). Most of the minerals were available from local supplies, like iron-oxide pigments (red ochre, yellow ochre, and umber); white derived from the calcium carbonate found in Egypt's extensive limestone hills; and blue and green from azurite and malachite.

Besides their decorative effect, colours were also used for their symbolic associations. Colours on sculptures, coffins, and architecture had both aesthetic and symbolic qualities. Ancient Egyptians saw black as the colour of the fertile alluvial soil, and so associated it with fertility and regeneration. Black was also associated with the afterlife, and was the colour of funerary deities like Anubis. White was the colour of purity, while green and blue were associated with vegetation and rejuvenation. Because of this, Osiris was often shown with green skin, and the faces of coffins from the 26th Dynasty were often green. Red, orange, and yellow were associated with the sun. Red was also the colour of the deserts, and hence associated with Set and the forces of destruction.

Later, during the 19th century, expeditions took place that had the purpose of cataloging the art and culture of ancient Egypt. Description de l'Égypte is a series of early 19th century publications full of illustrations of monuments and artifacts of Ancient Egypt. Most are black-and-white, but some are colourful, so they can show the polychromy from the past. In some cases, only a few traces of paint remained on the walls, pillars and sculptures, but the illustrators attempted successfully at showing the buildings' original state in their pictures.

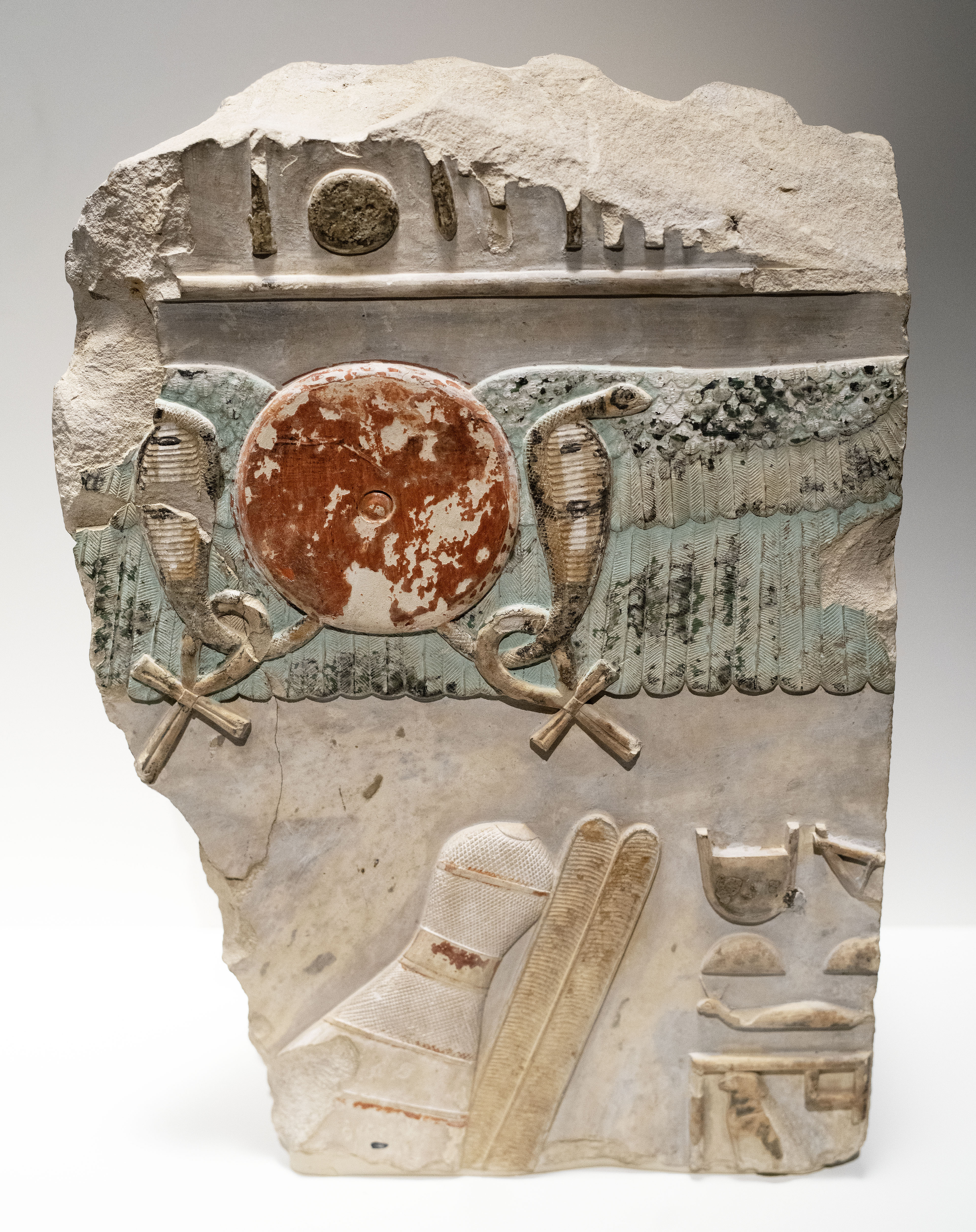
Fragment of a temple relief, 2150–1991 BC, painted limestone, British Museum, London

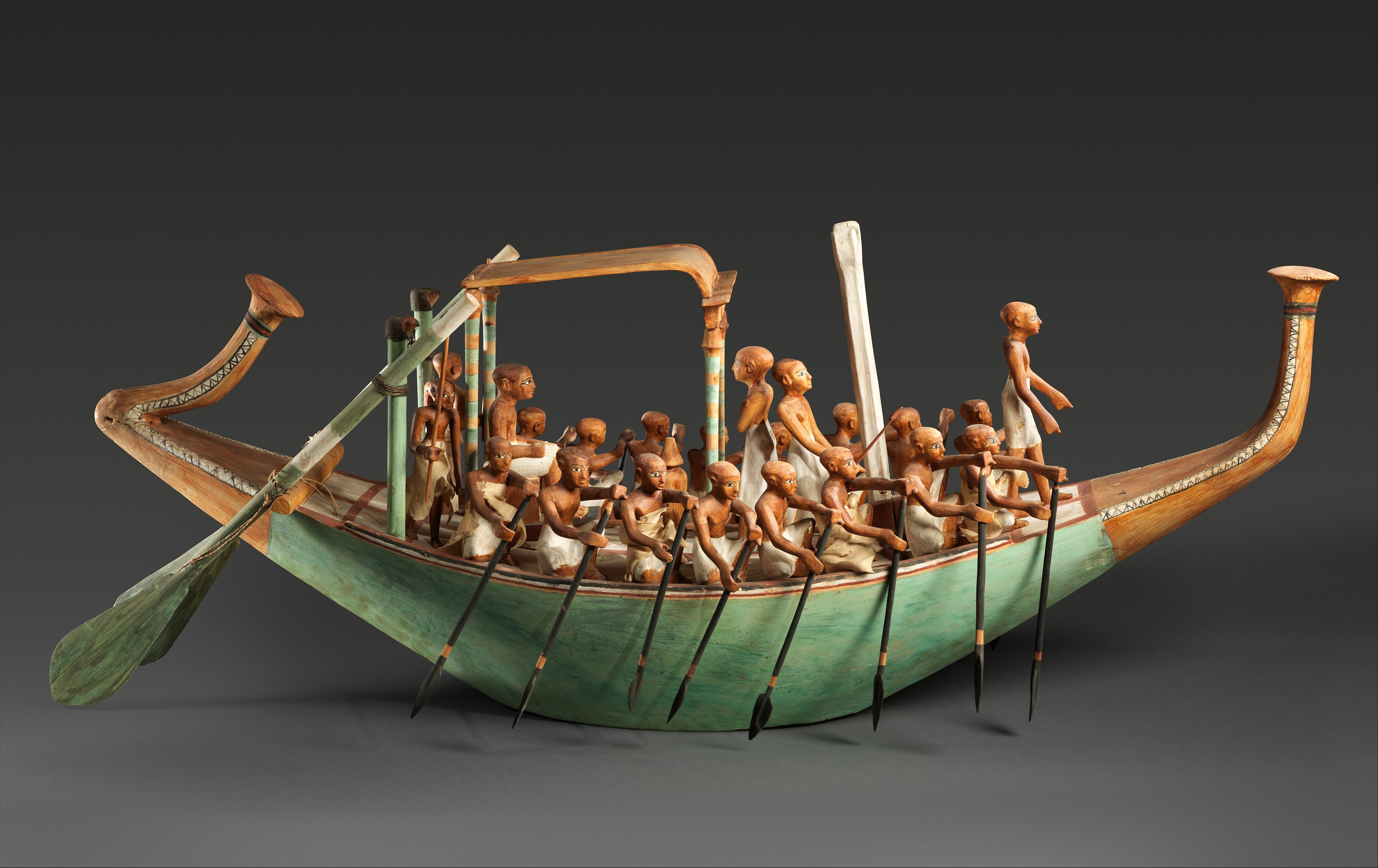
Model paddling boat, c. 1981 – c. 1975 BC, wood, paint, plaster, linen twine and linen fabric, Metropolitan Museum of Art, New York City

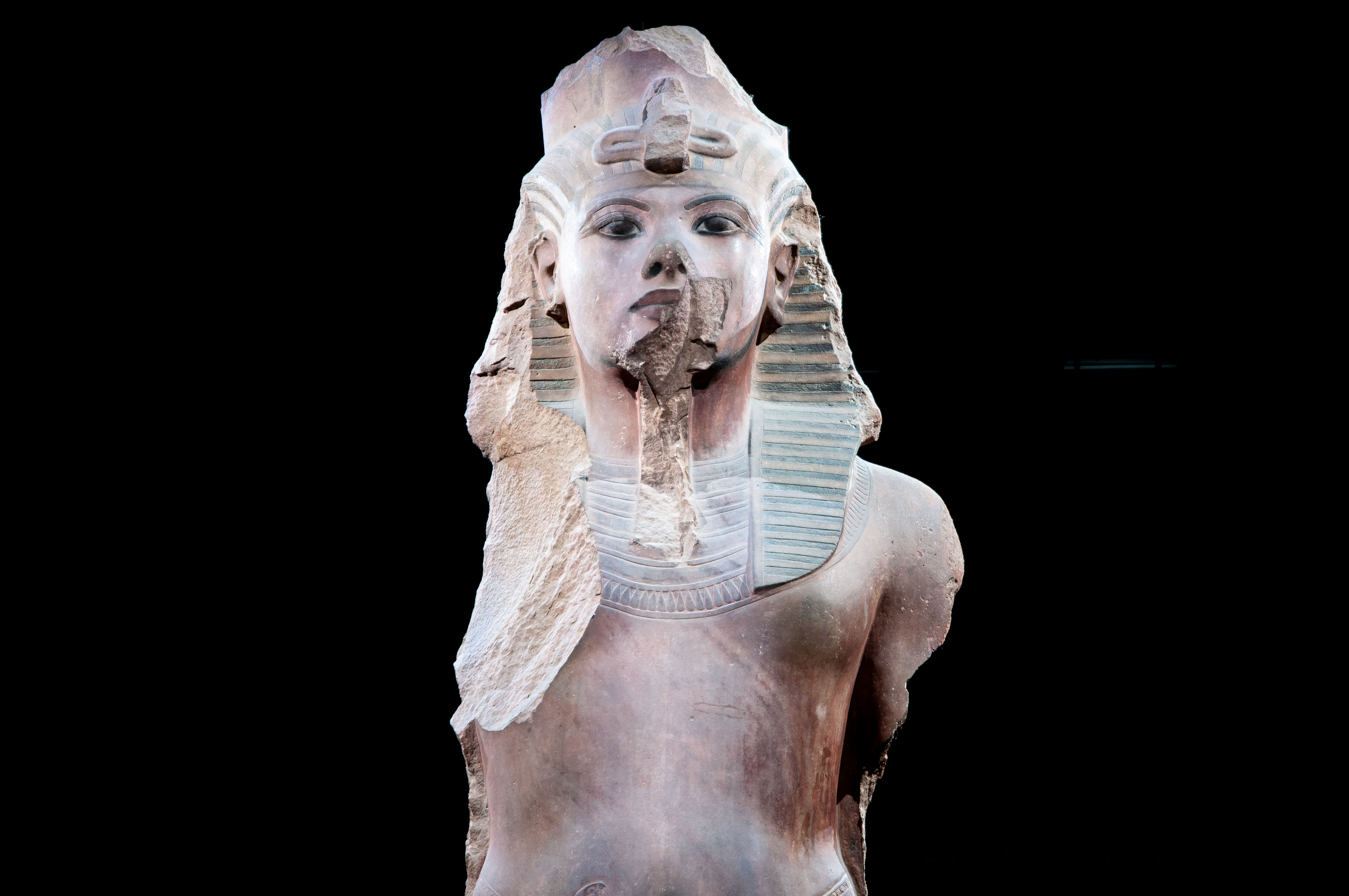
Colossal statue of Tutankhamun, c. 1355 – c. 1315 BC, painted quartzite, Grand Egyptian Museum, Giza, Egypt

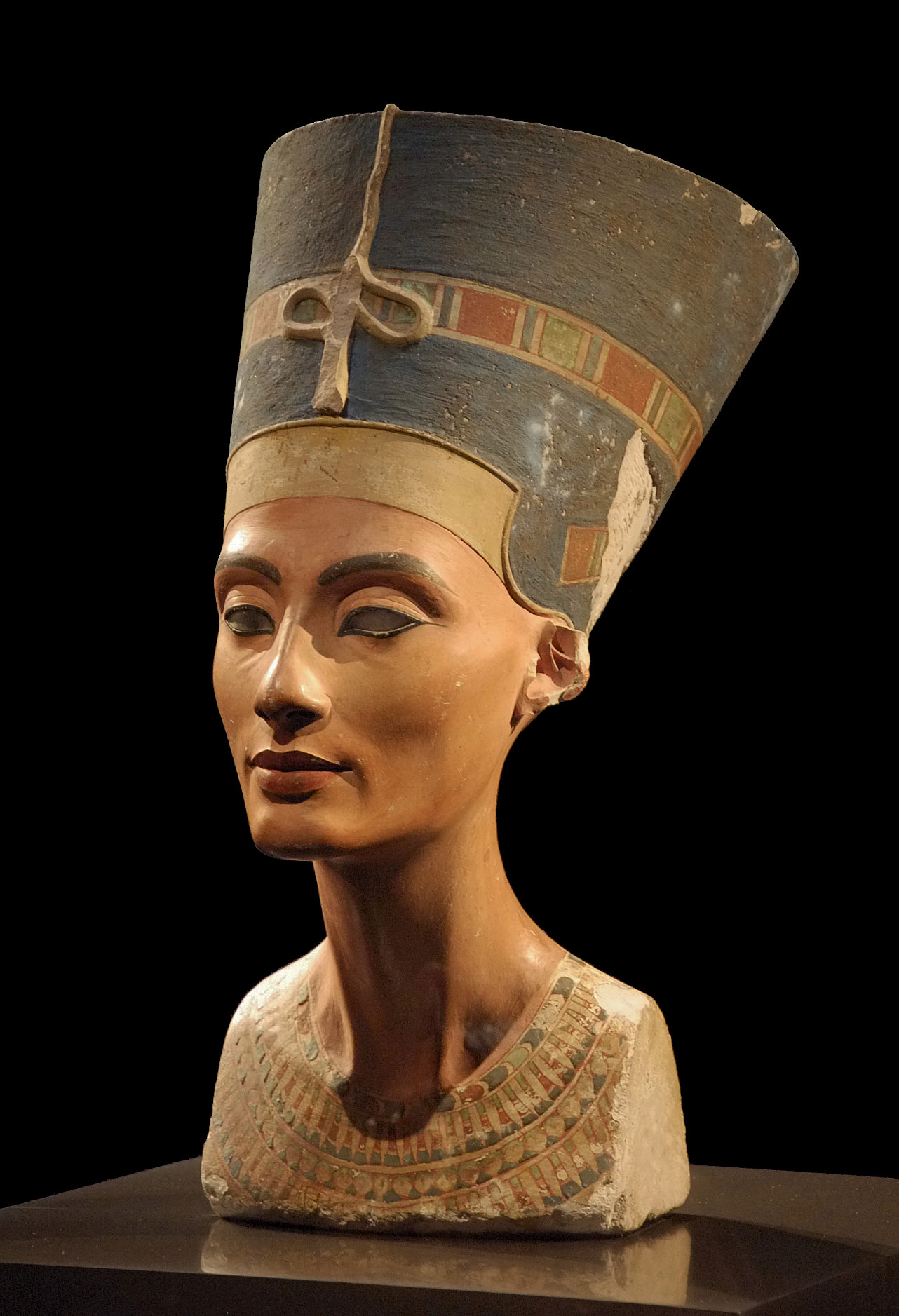
Bust of Nefertiti, c. 1352 – c. 1336 BC, polychrome limestone and plaster, Neues Museum, Berlin, Germany

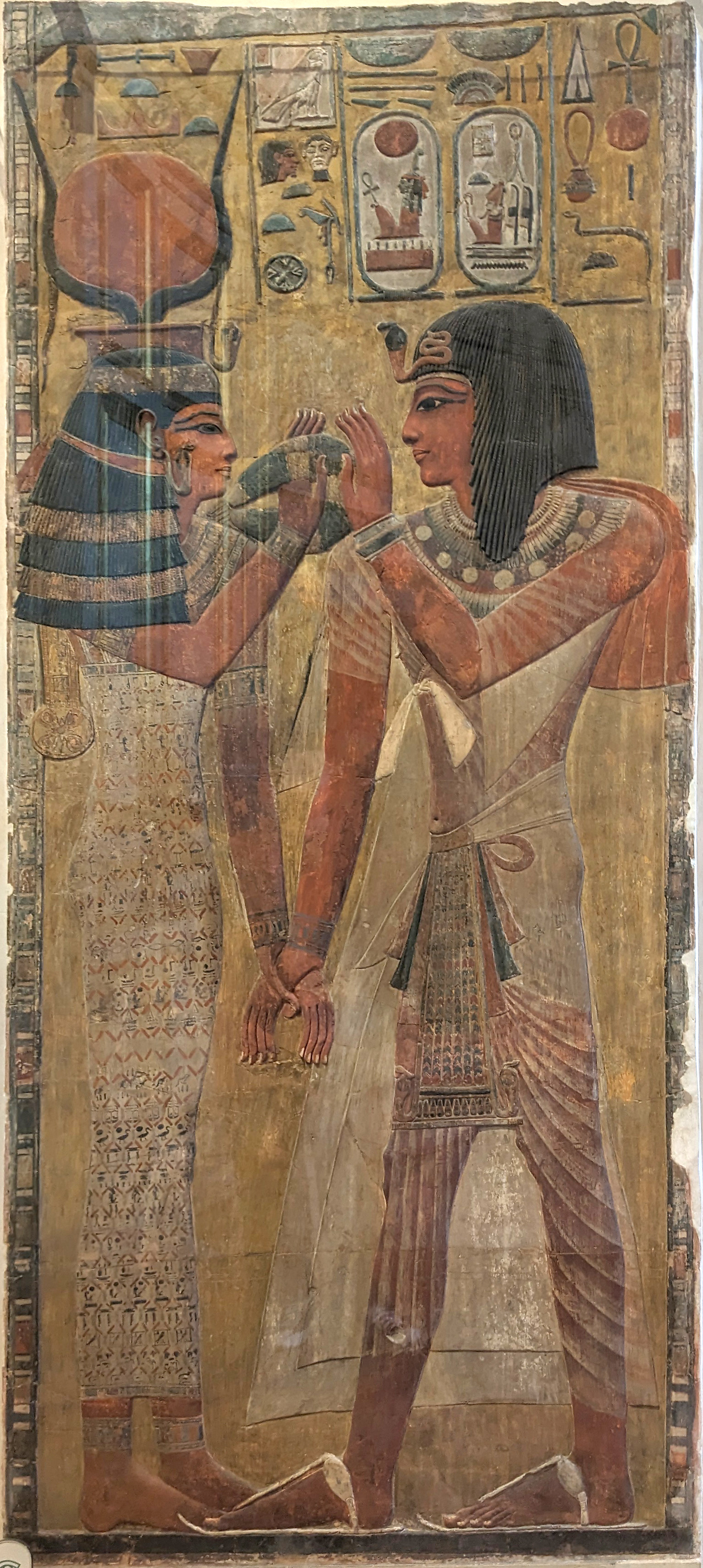
Relief of Sethi I and Hathor, 13th century BC, limestone, Louvre

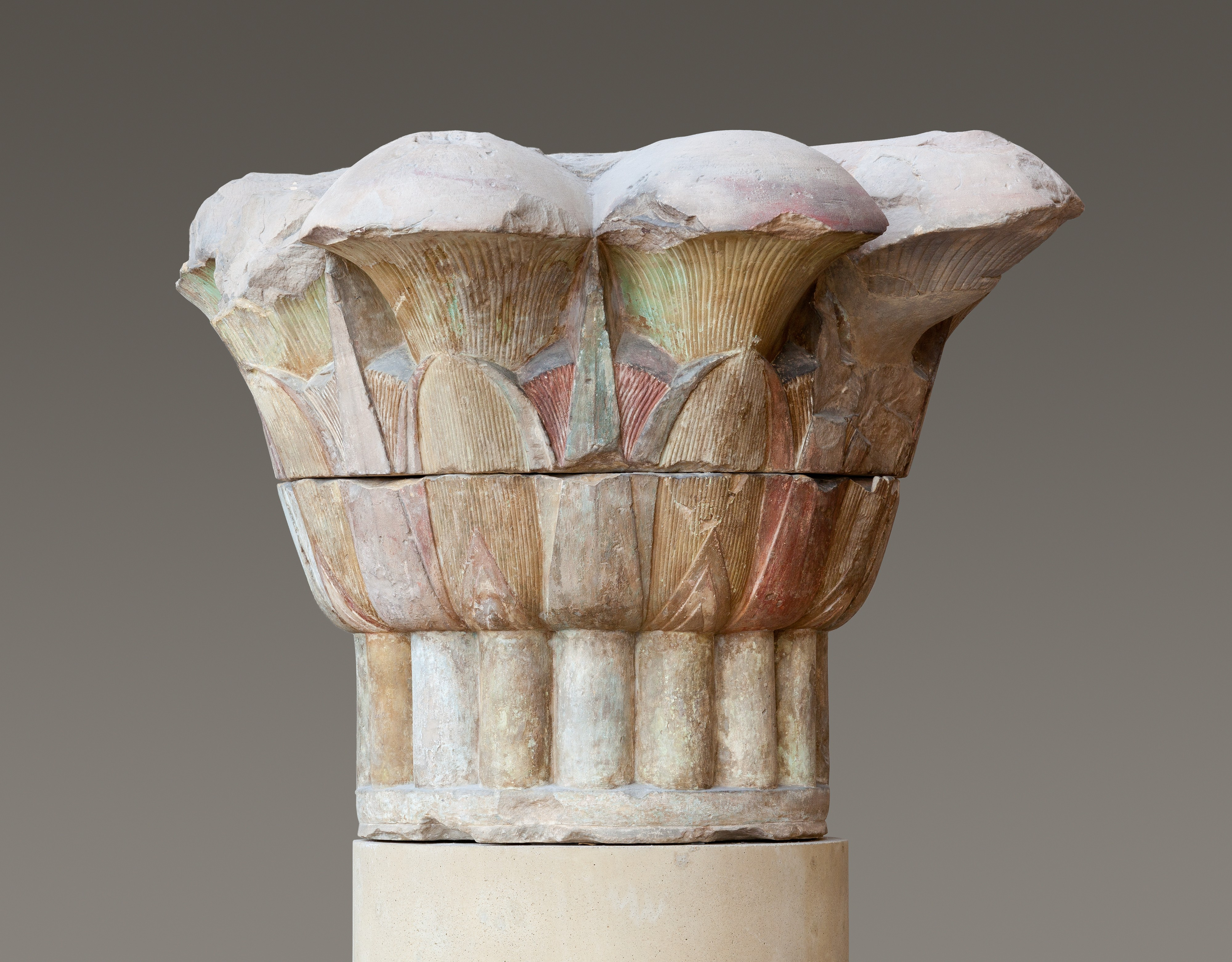
Composite papyrus capital, c. 380 – c. 343 BC, polychrome sandstone, Metropolitan Museum of Art

Fragment of the sarcophagus of Djedthothiuefankh, 332–305 BC, wood and colourful glass, Museo Egizio, Turin, Italy

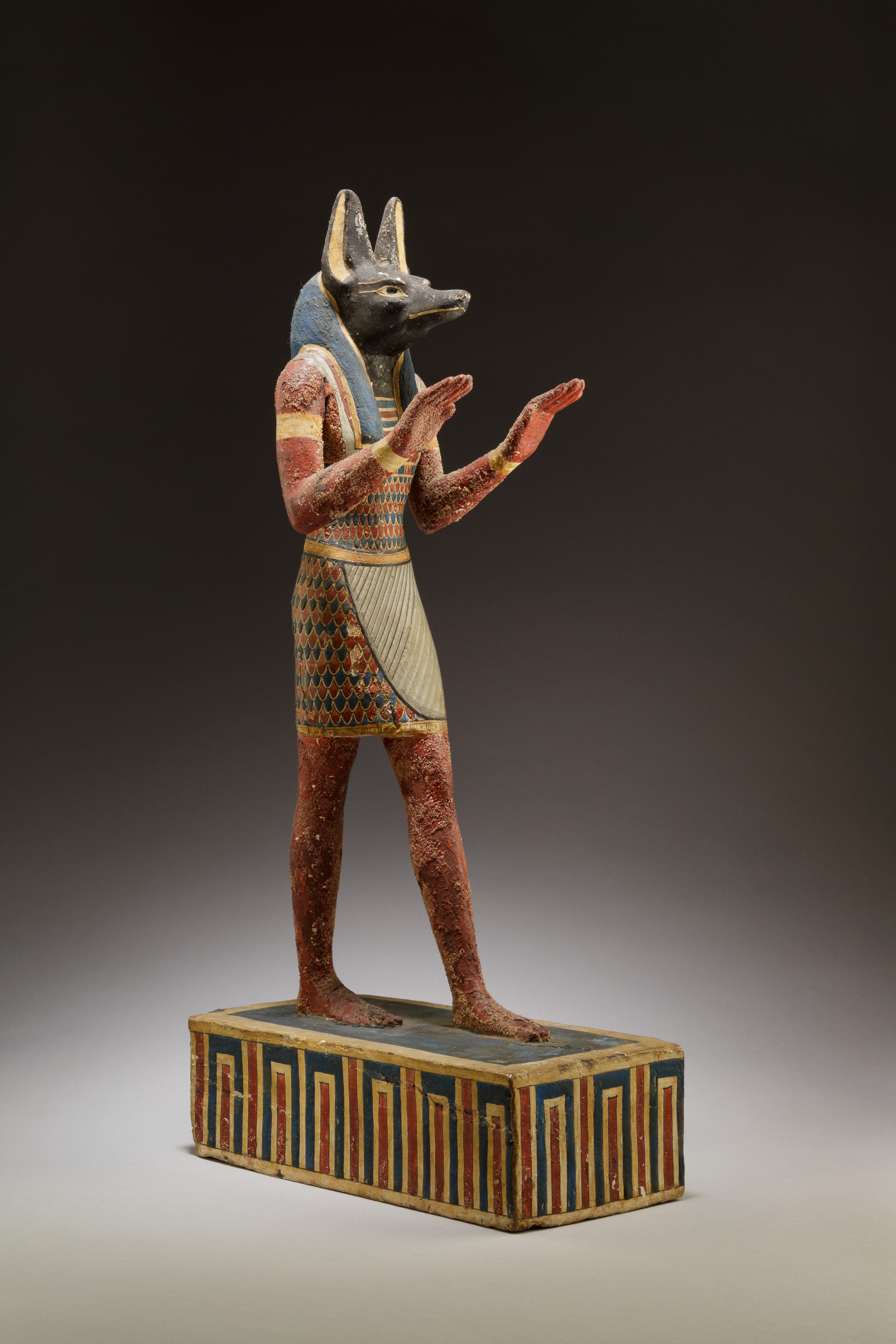
Statuette of Anubis, 332–30 BC, plastered and painted wood, Metropolitan Museum of Art

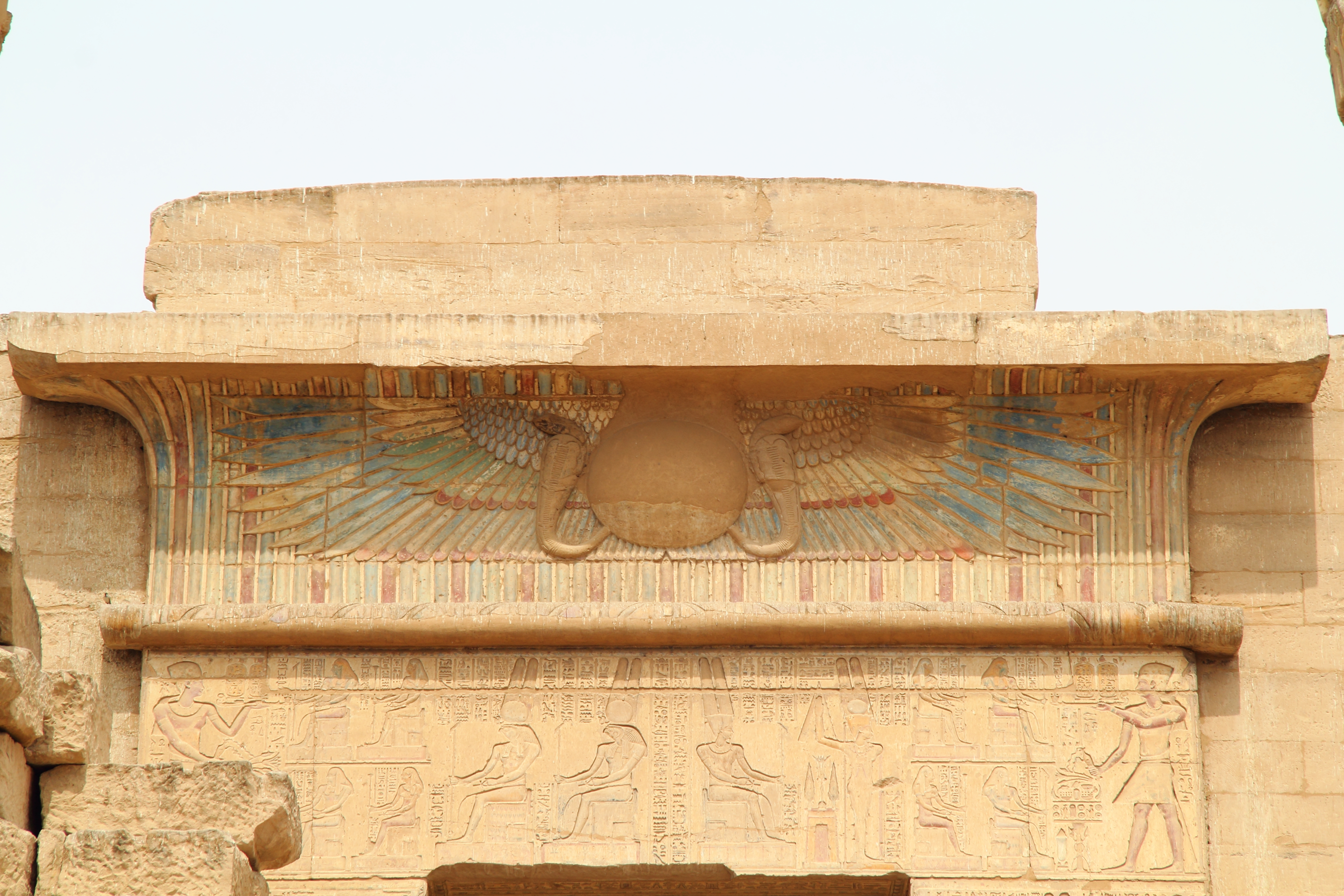
Winged sun on a cavetto at the Medinet Habu temple complex, Egypt, unknown architect, unknown date

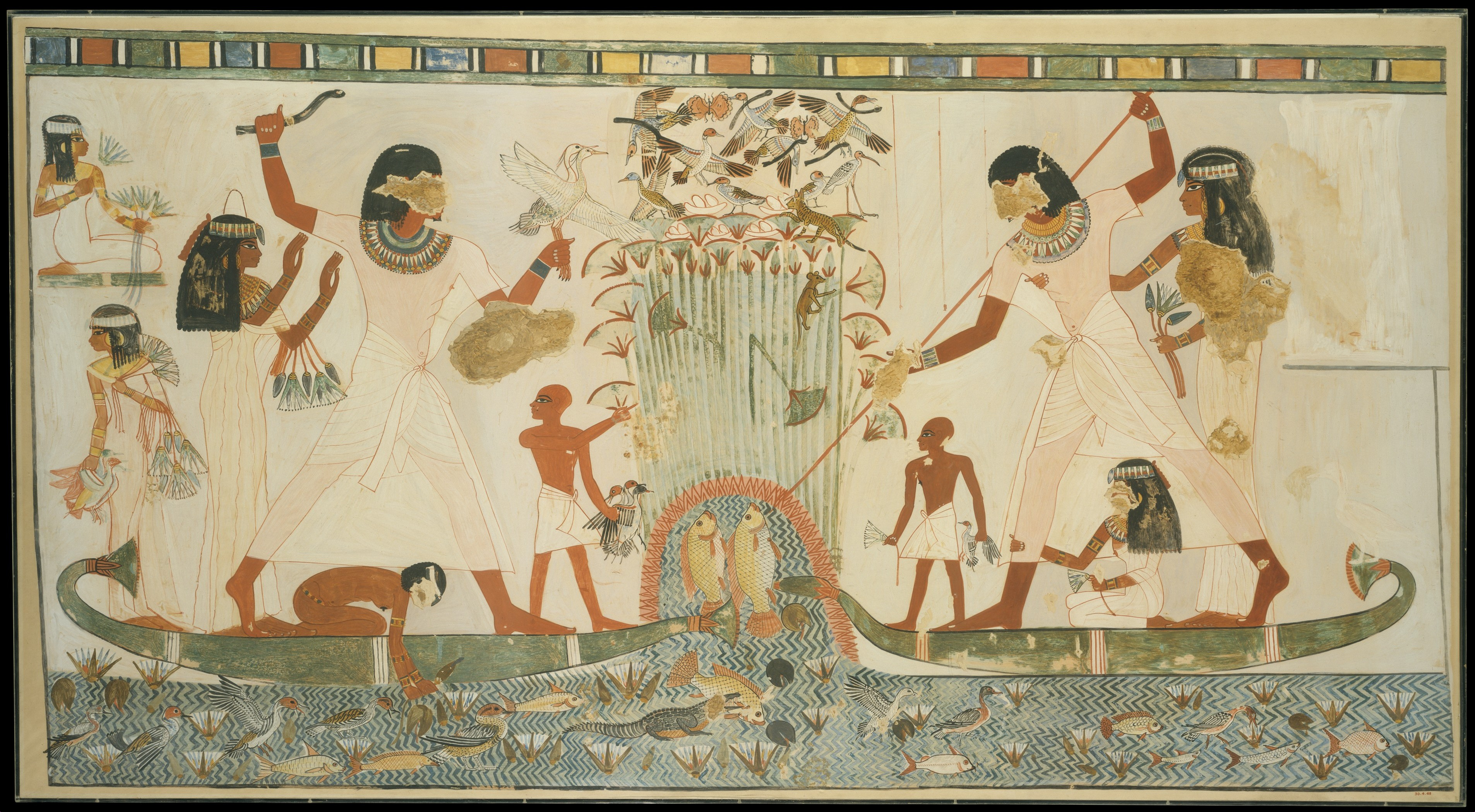
Menna and Family Hunting in the Marshes, Tomb of Menna, 14th century BC

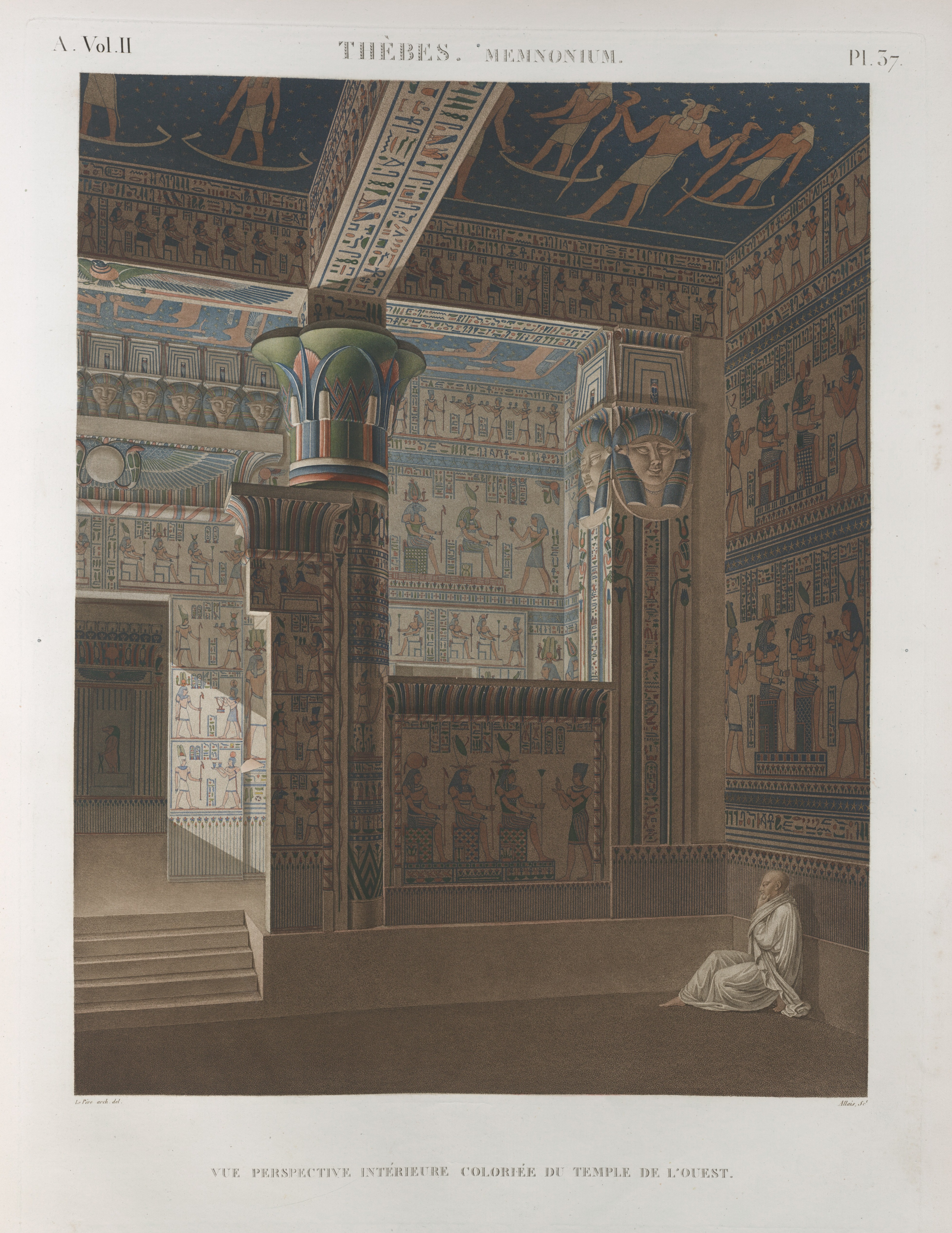
Intact interior of the Ramesseum, Egypt, illustration from Description de l'Égypte, unknown illustrator, 1809

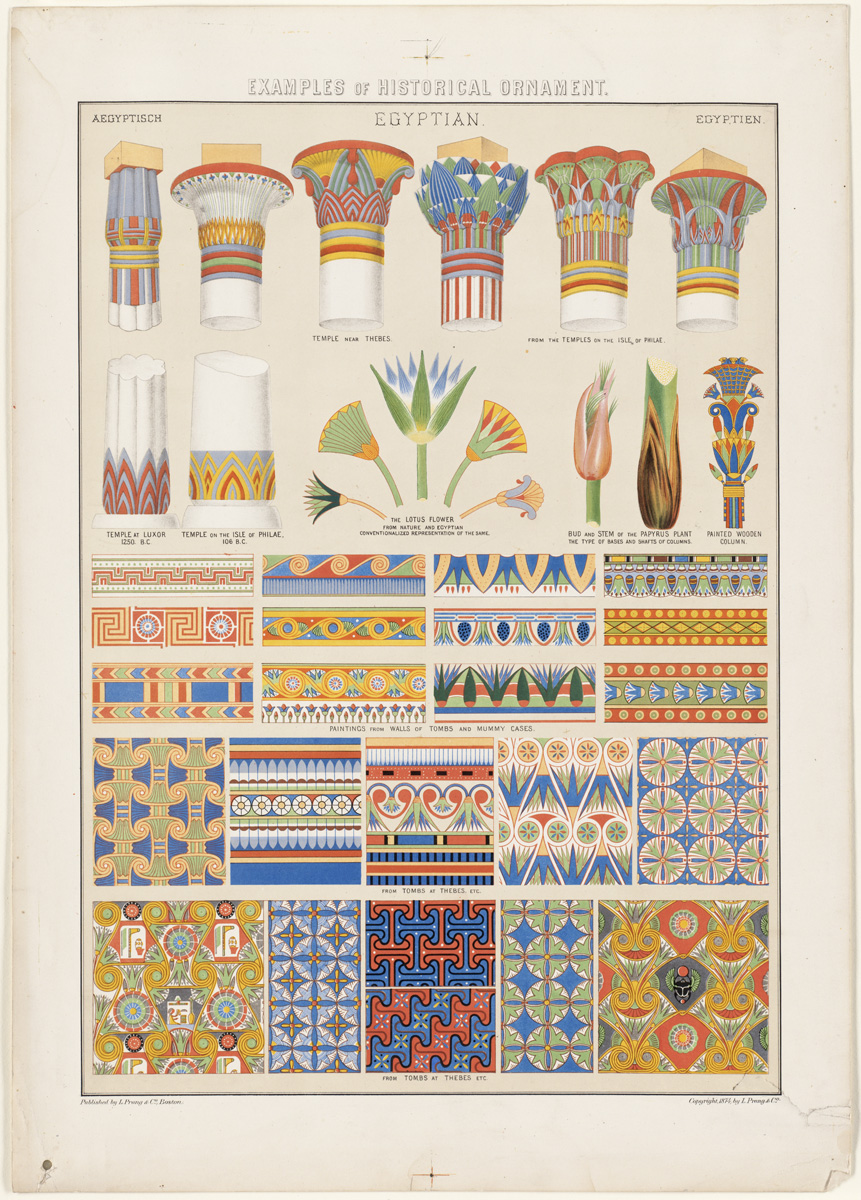
Egyptian patterns, motifs and capitals, unknown illustrator, published by L. Prang & Co., 1874

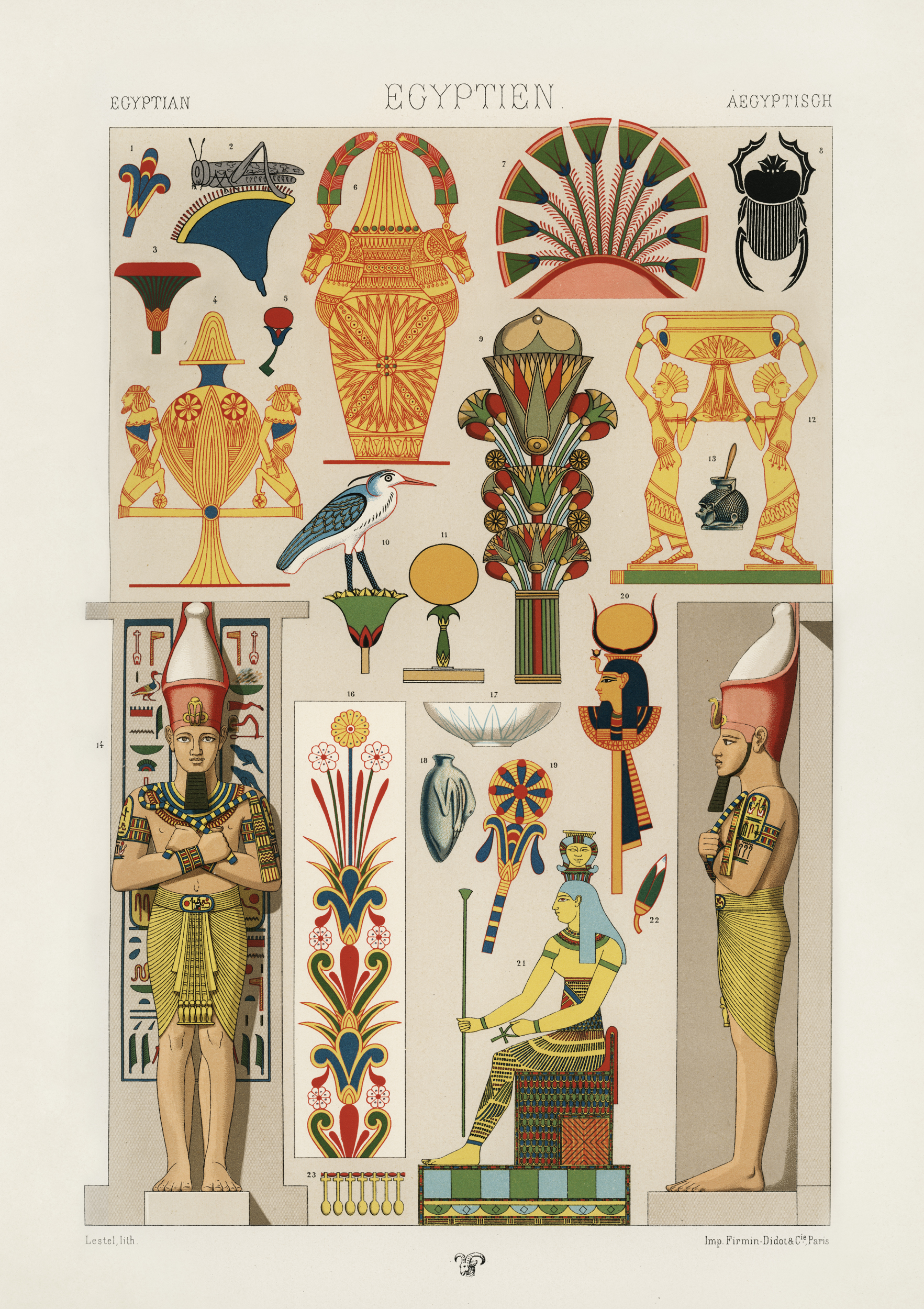
Egyptian motifs from L'Ornement Polychrome, by Albert Racinet, 1888

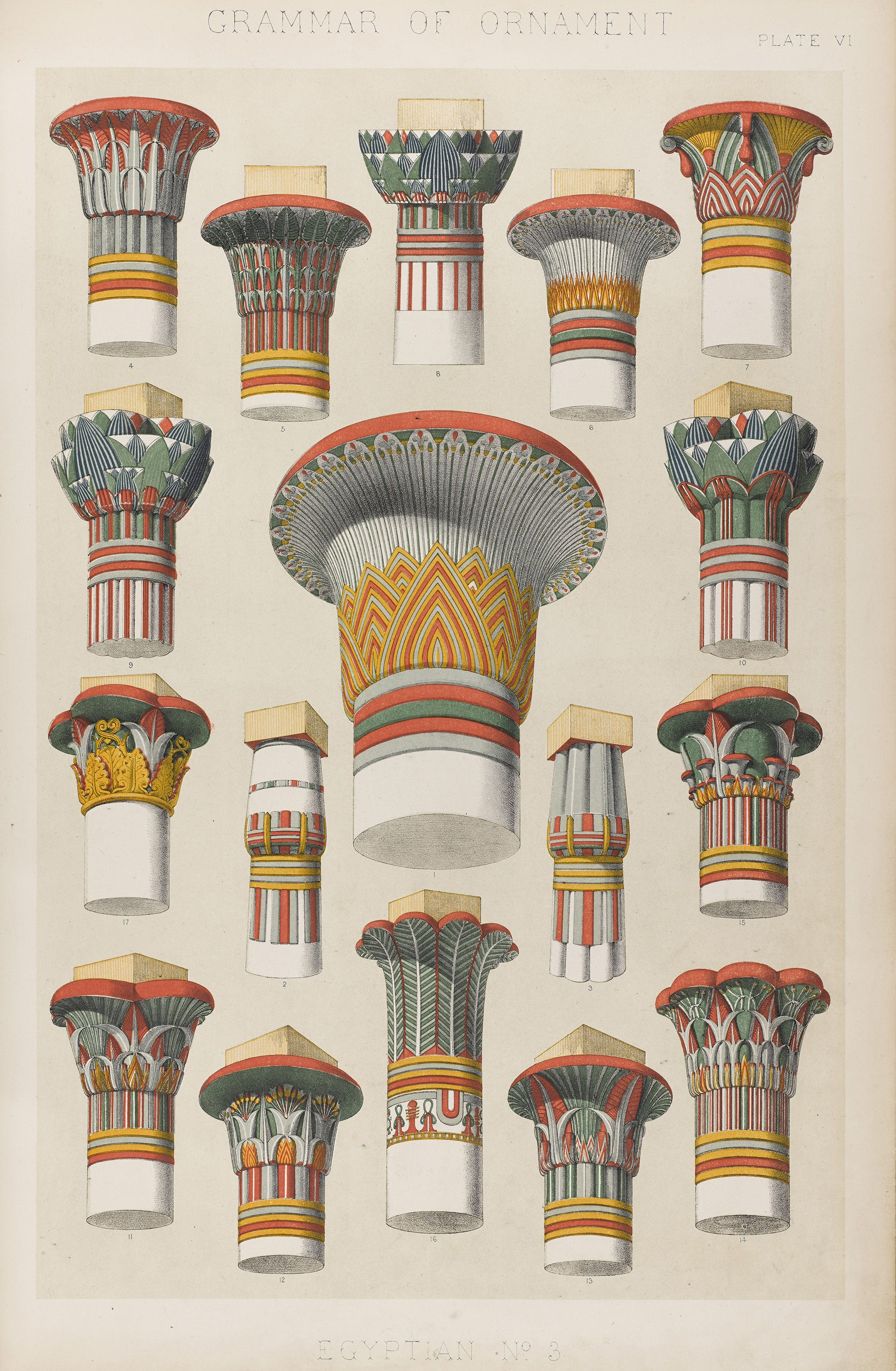
Various examples of Ancient Egyptian polychrome capitals, unknown illustrator, 19th century

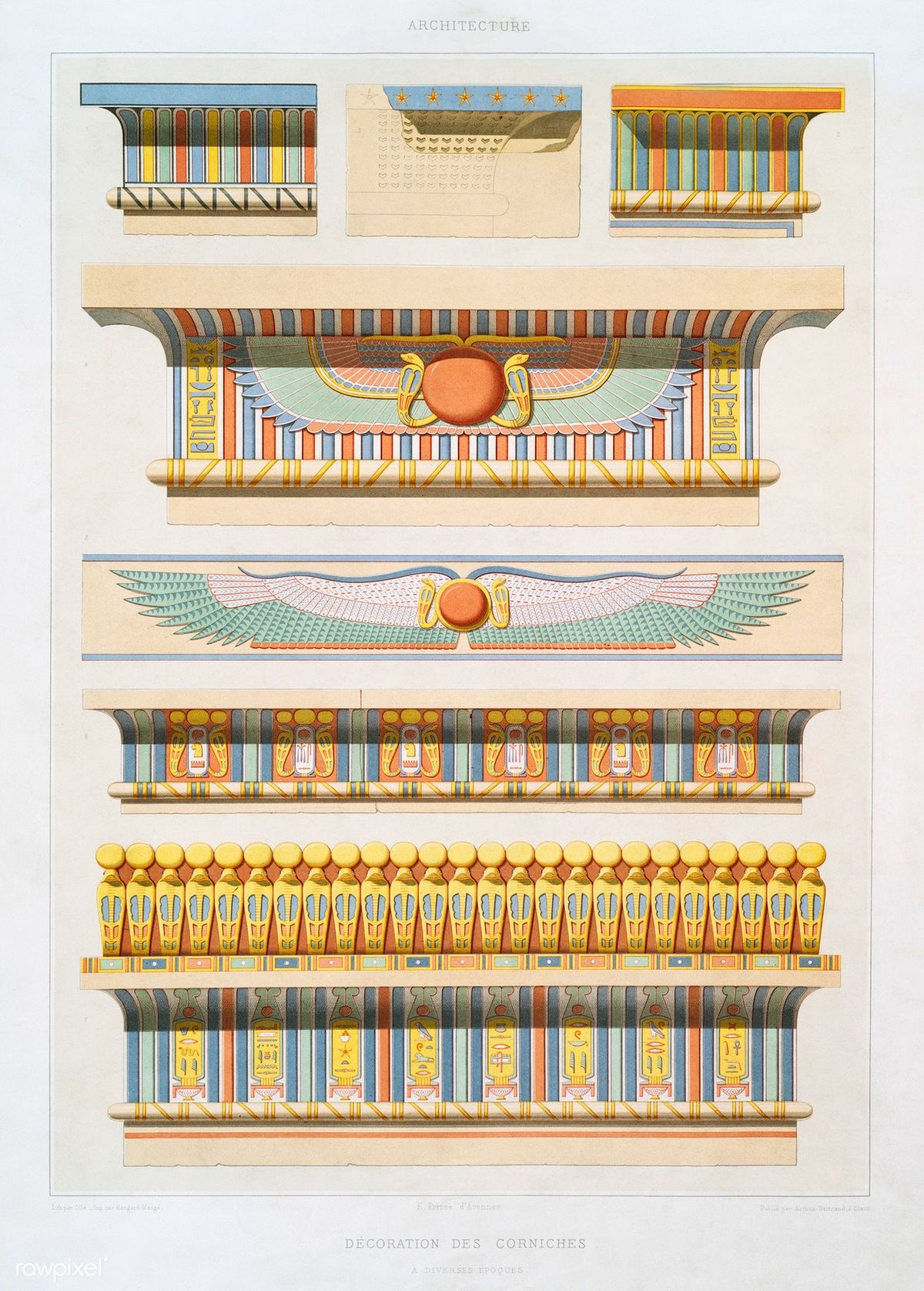
Various examples of Ancient Egyptian corniches, unknown illustrator, 19th century

== Classical world ==
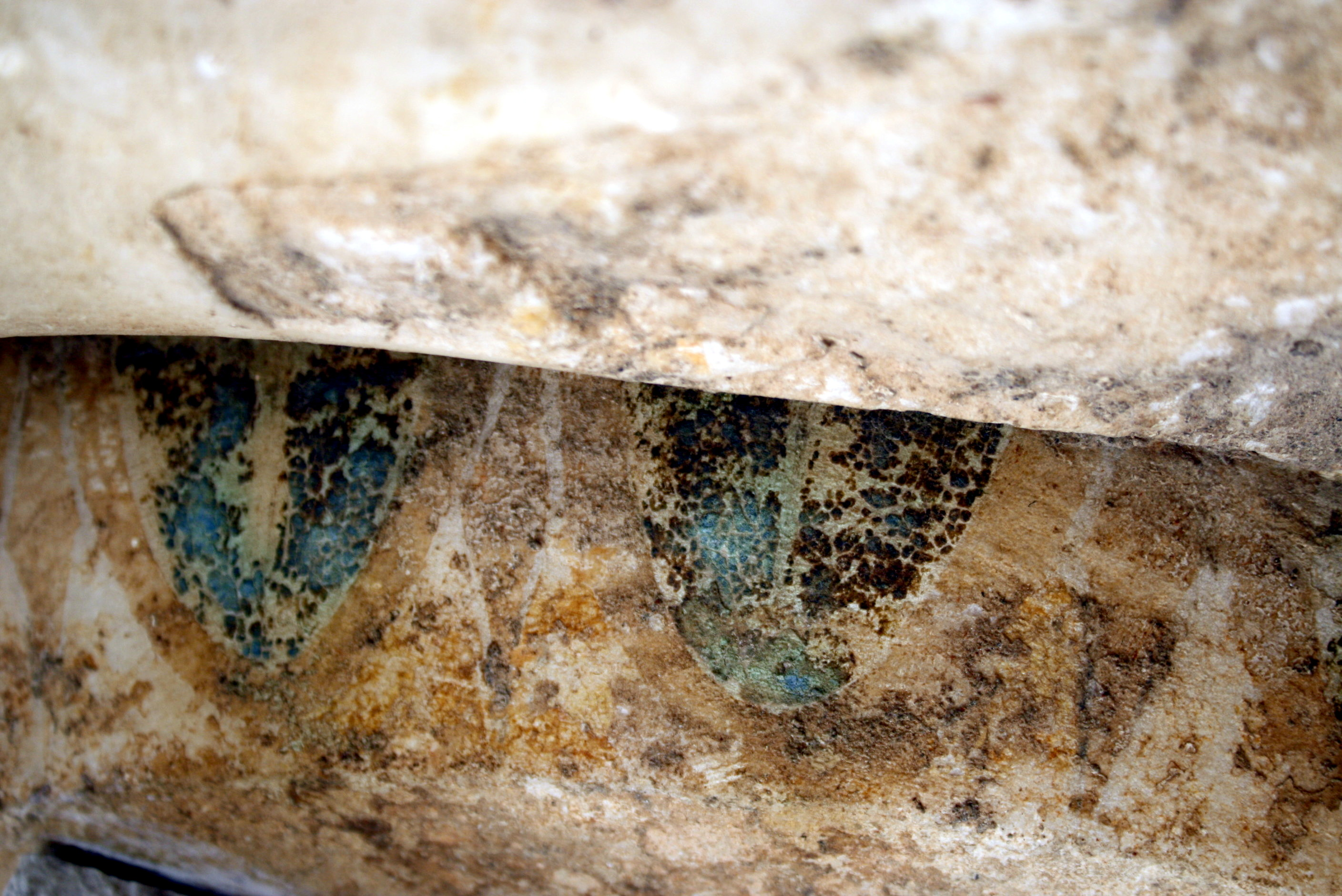
Relics of polychrome on an Ancient Greek Ionic capital, from an unidentified 5th century BC building, Ancient Agora Museum, Athens, Stoa of Attalus

Some very early polychrome pottery has been excavated on Minoan Crete such as at the Bronze Age site of Phaistos. In both Ancient Greece and Ancient Rome sculptures were painted with vivid colors. The paint was frequently limited to parts depicting clothing, hair, and so on, with the skin left in the natural color of the stone. But many sculptures were covered in their totality. The painting of Greek and Roman sculpture should not merely be seen as an enhancement of their sculpted form but has the characteristics of a distinct style of art. For example, the pedimental sculptures from the Temple of Aphaia on Aegina have recently been demonstrated to have been painted with bold and elaborate patterns, depicting, amongst other details, patterned clothing. The polychrome of stone statues was paralleled by the use of materials to distinguish skin, clothing, and other details in chryselephantine sculptures, and by the use of metals to depict lips, nipples, etc., on high-quality bronzes like the Riace bronzes. The availability of modern digital methods and techniques have allowed the reconstruction and visualization of ancient 3D polychromy in a scientifically sound method and many projects have explored these possibilities in the last years.

An early example of polychrome decoration was found in the Parthenon atop the Acropolis of Athens. By the time European antiquarianism took off in the 18th century, however, the paint that had been on classical buildings had completely weathered off. Thus, the antiquarians' and architects' first impressions of these ruins were that classical beauty was expressed only through shape and composition, lacking in robust colors, and it was that impression which informed neoclassical architecture. However, some classicists such as Jacques Ignace Hittorff noticed traces of paint on classical architecture and this slowly came to be accepted. Such acceptance was later accelerated by observation of minute color traces by microscopic and other means, enabling less tentative reconstructions than Hittorff and his contemporaries had been able to produce. An example of classical Greek architectural polychrome may be seen in the full size replica of the Parthenon exhibited in Nashville, Tennessee, US.

=== Ancient Greece ===
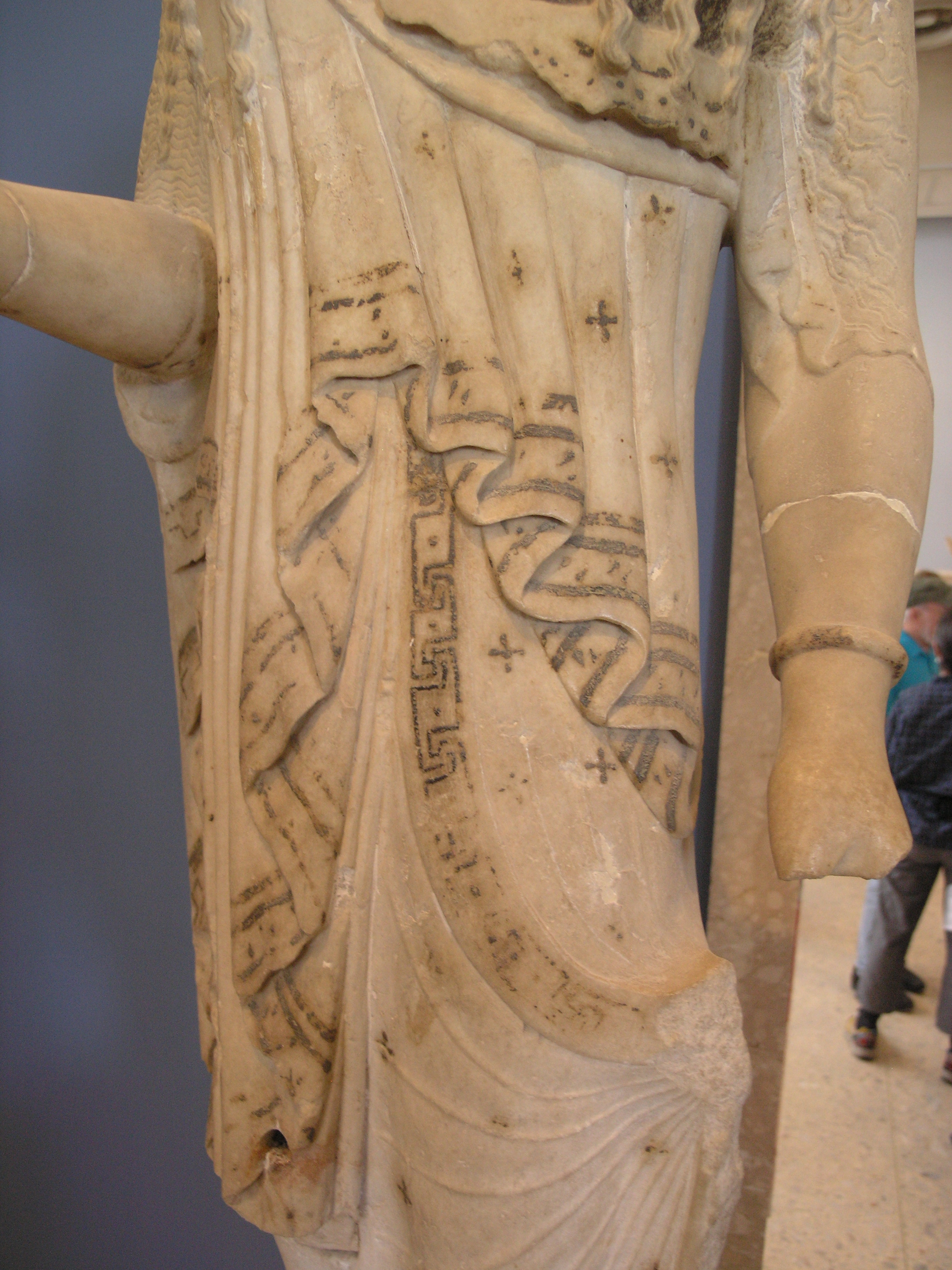
Traces of paint depicting embroidered patterns on the peplos of an Archaic Kore, c. 530 BC marble, Acropolis Museum, Athens, Greece

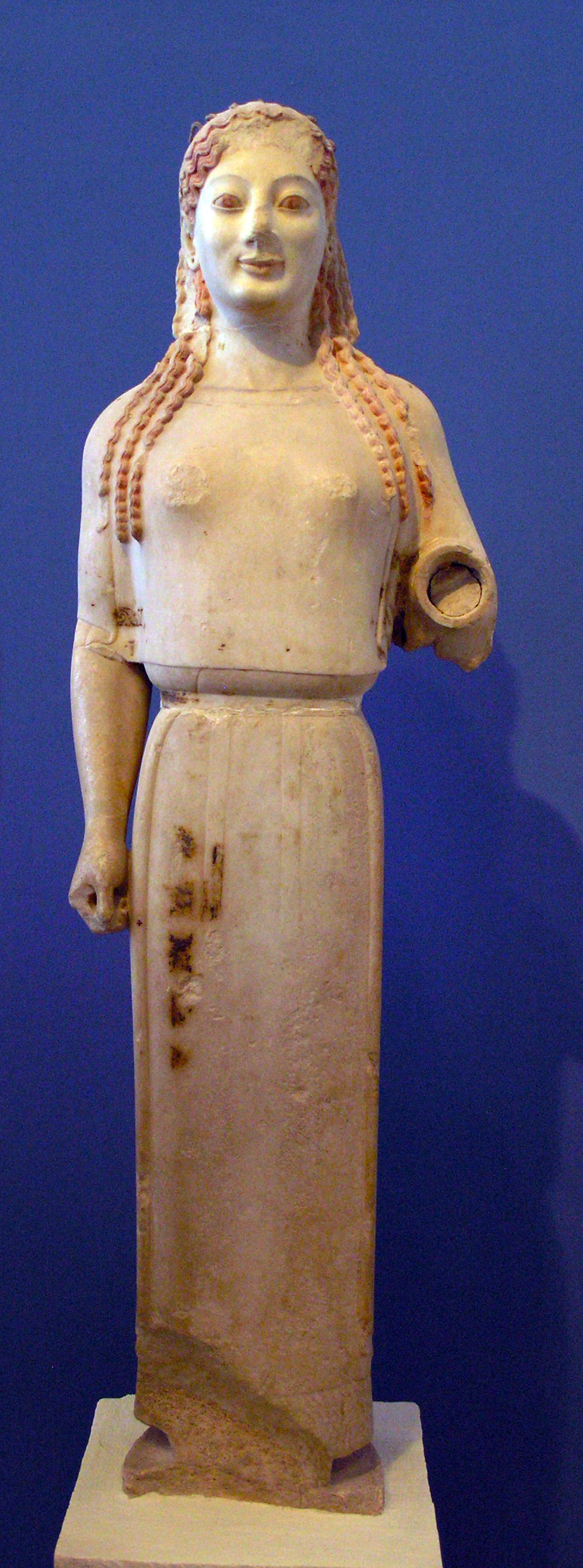
Polychrome on the Peplos Kore, c. 530 BC, Parian marble, Acropolis Museum

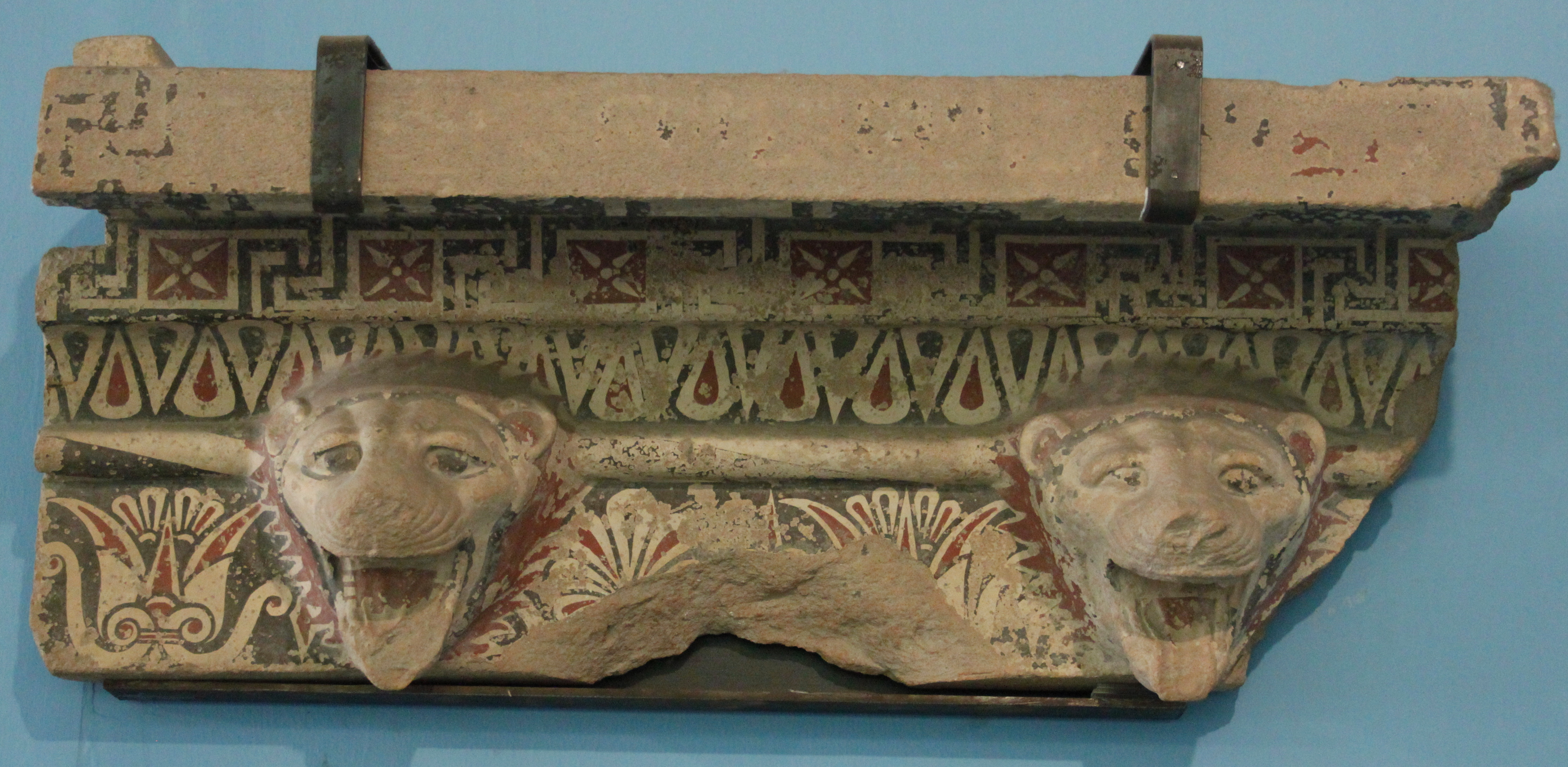
Carved and painted fragment from the roofline of the Temple of Hera at Paestum, c. 520 BC, Museo Archeologico Nazionale, Italy

Polychrome on the fragments from a Doric temple of Selinunte, Sicily, 6th century BC, Antonino Salinas Regional Archaeological Museum, Palermo, Italy

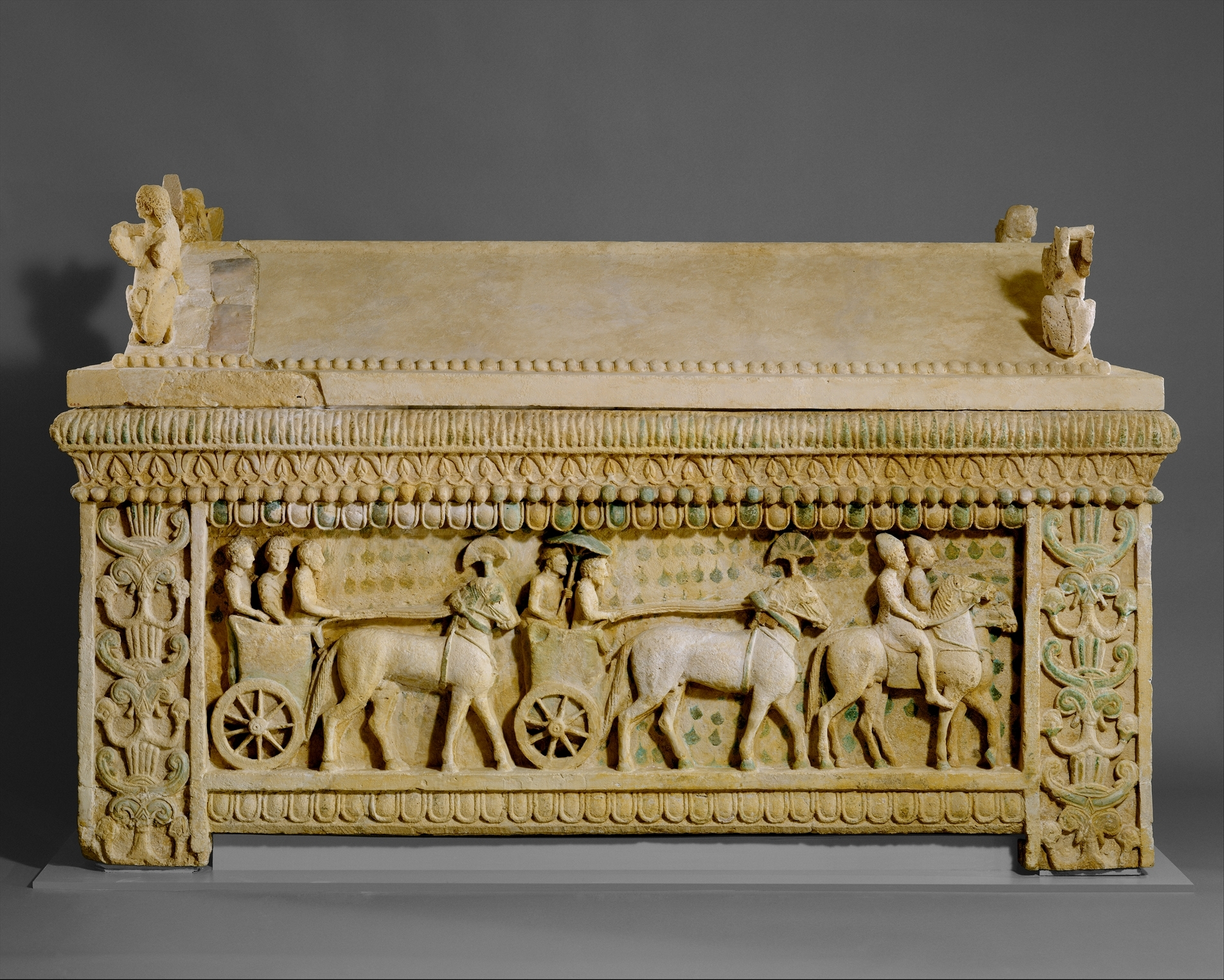
Amathus Sarcophagus, c. 475 – c. 450 BC, limestone, Metropolitan Museum of Art, New York City

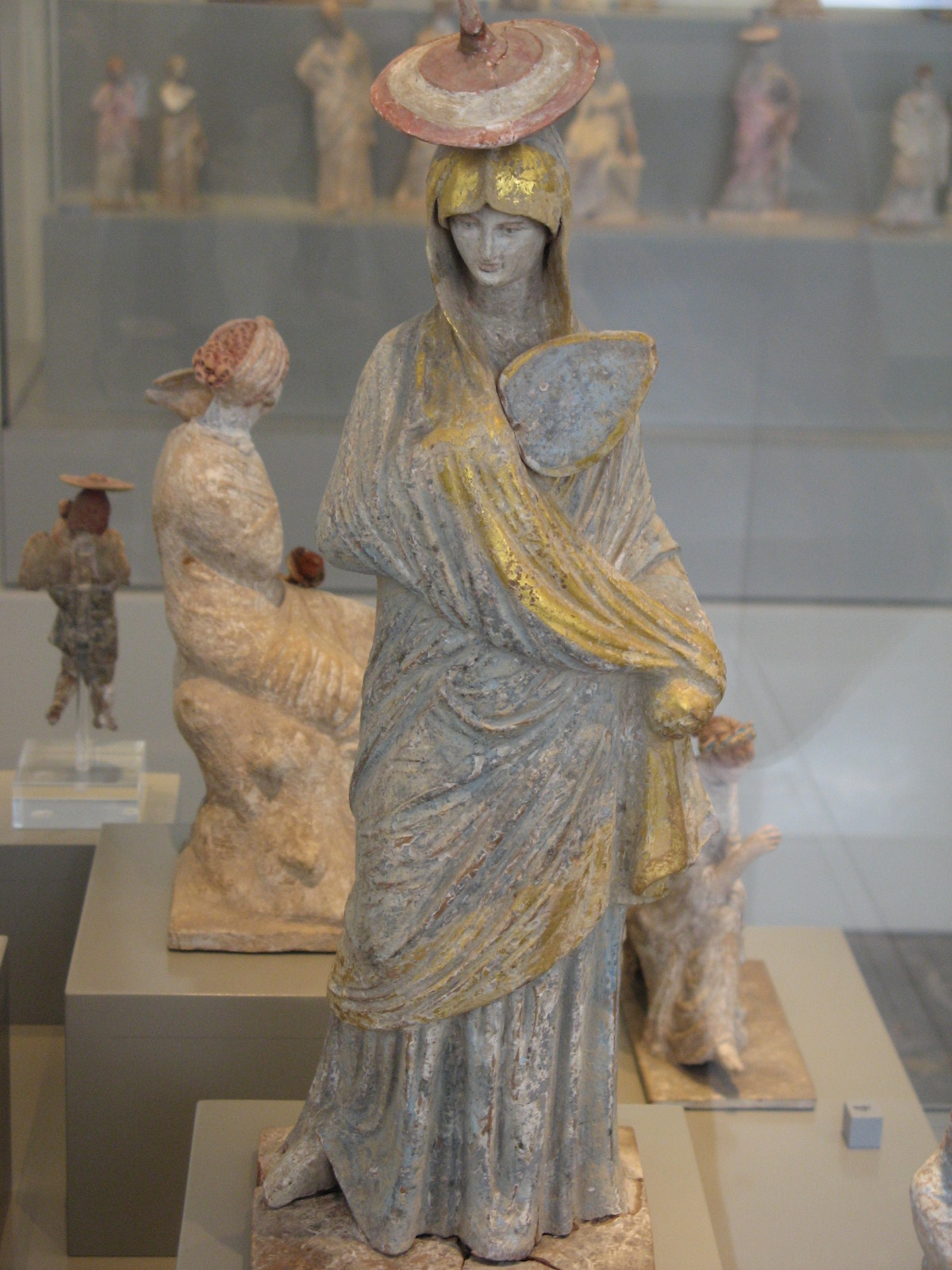
Terracota figurine of a woman with painted blue and gilt garment, from Tanagra, 325–300 BC, Antikensammlung Berlin, Germany

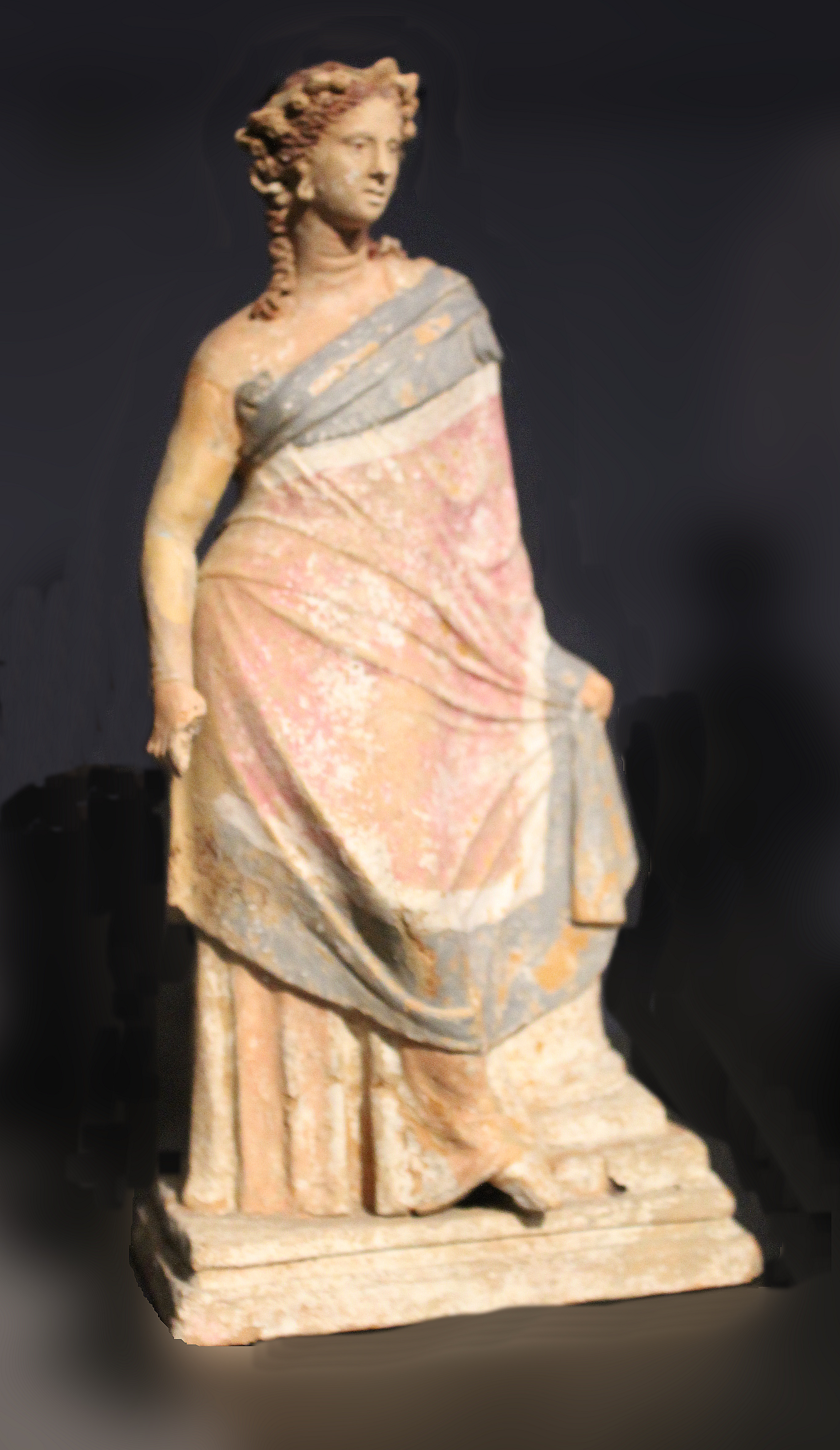
Terracota figurine of a young woman, with kaolin and traces of polychromy, 3rd–2nd century BC, Liebieghaus, Germany

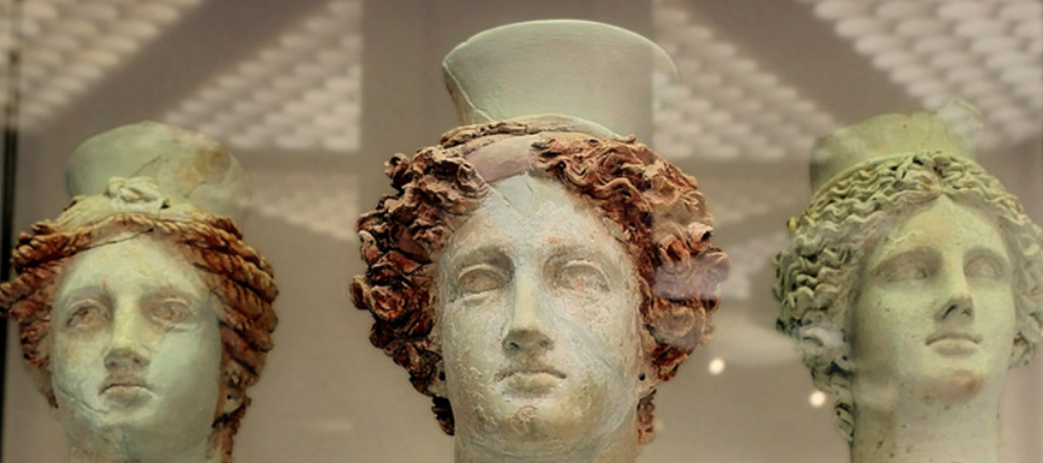
Traces of red paint on Korai busts from the Hellenistic period, Museo Archeologico Paolo Orsi, Syracuse, Sicily

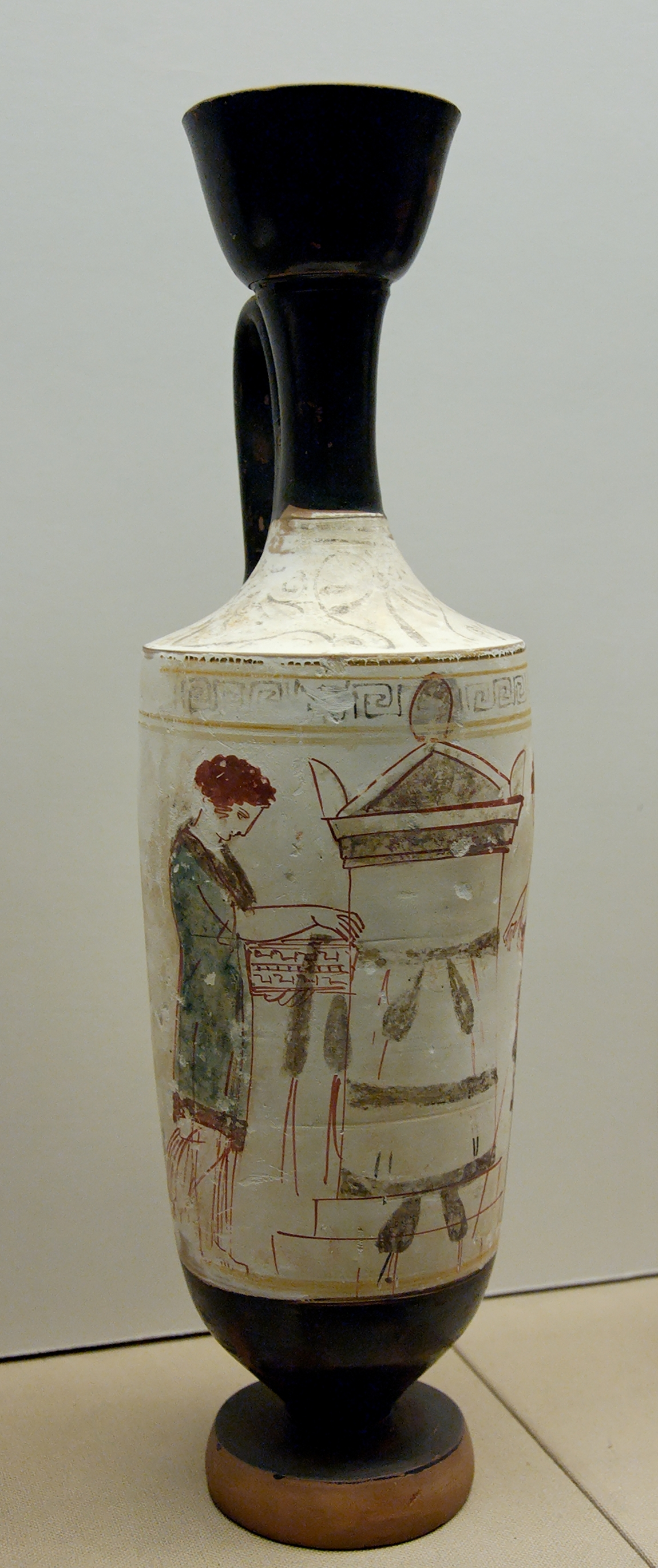
White-ground lekythos with a scene of mourning by the Reed Painter, c. 420-410 BC, British Museum

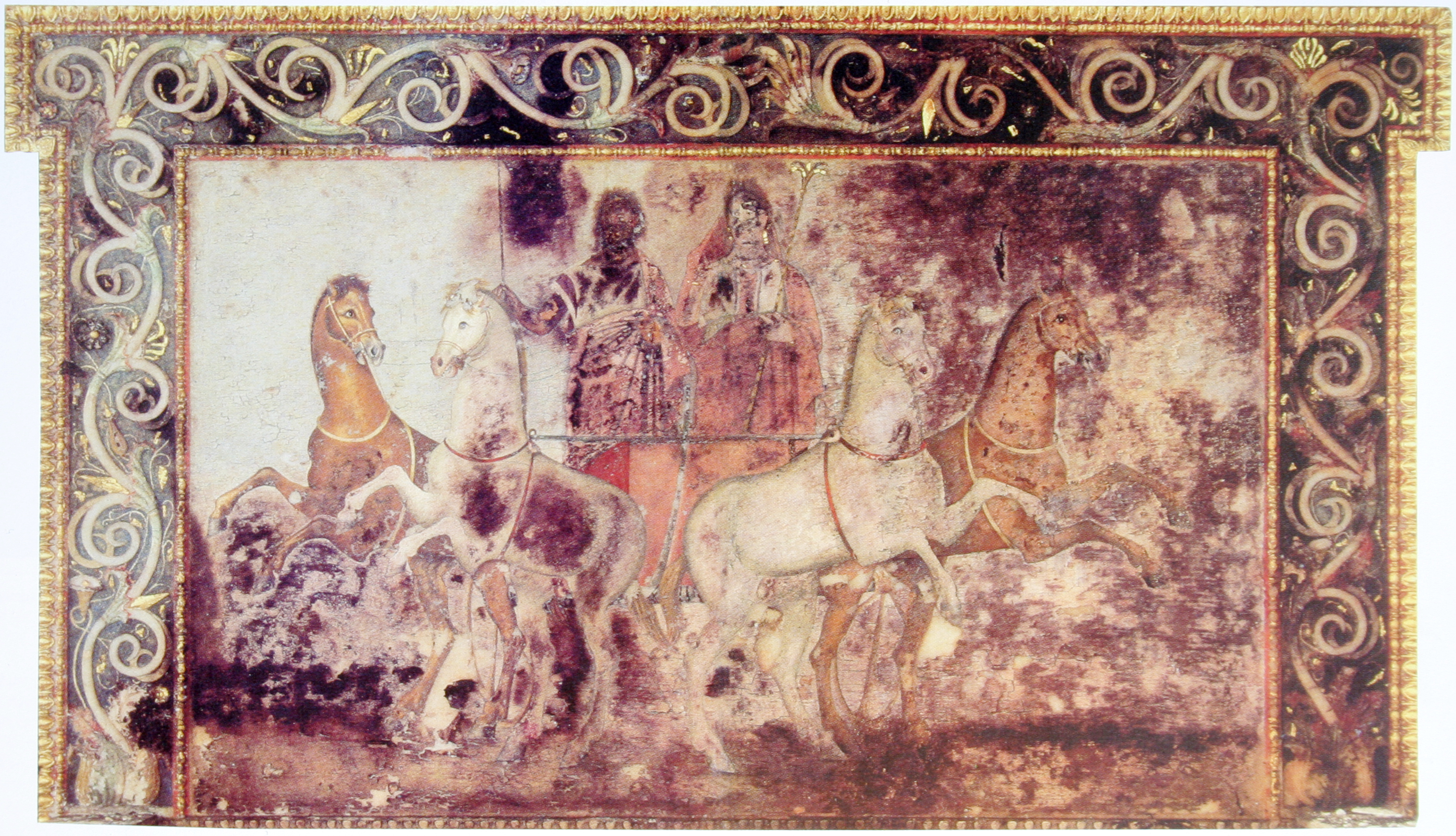
Hades and Persephone, c. 340 BC, pigments on marble, Museum of the Royal Tombs of Aigai, Vergina, Greece

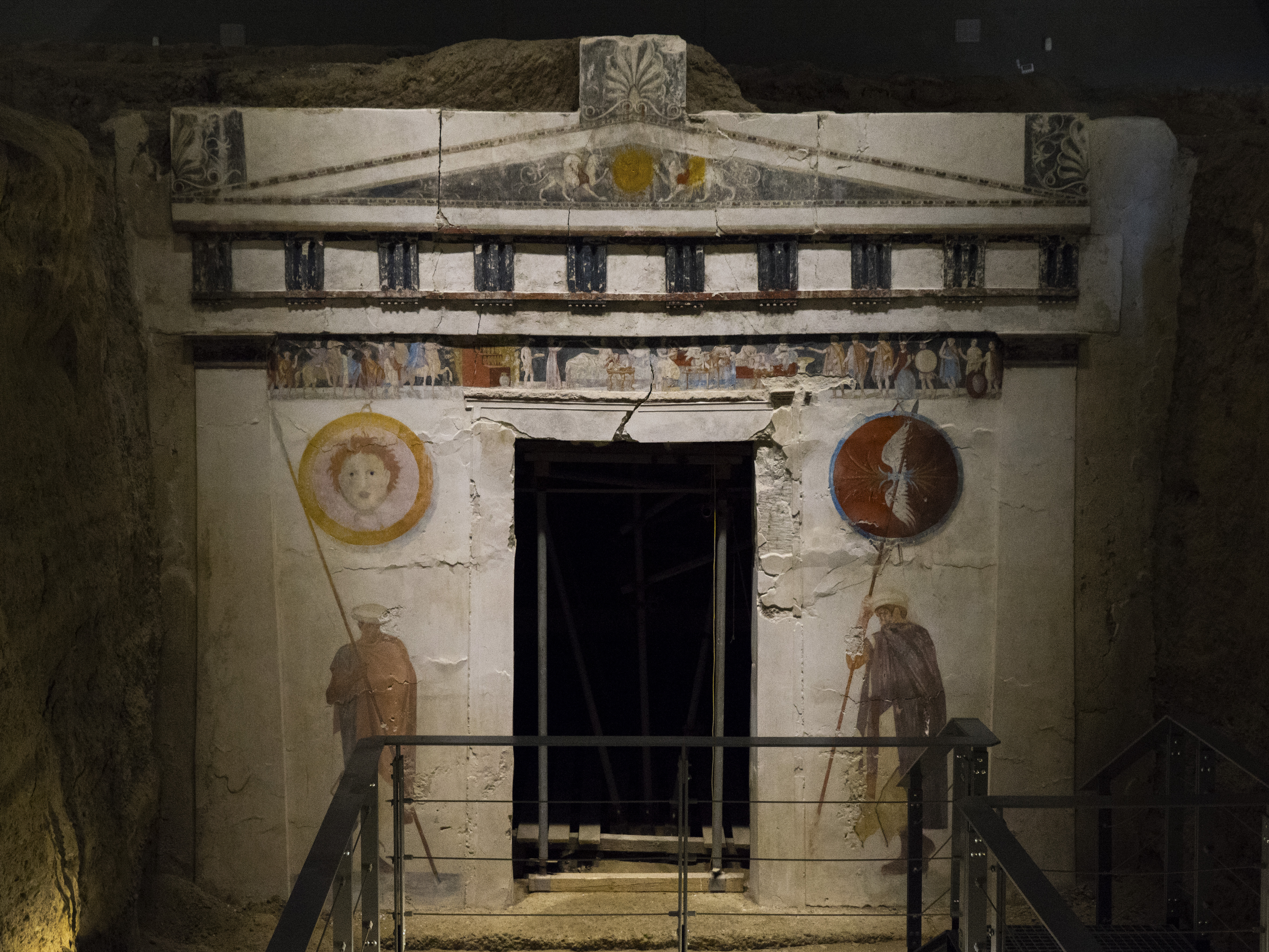
Facade of an ancient tomb at Agios Athanasios, c. 325–300 BC, Macedonia, Greece

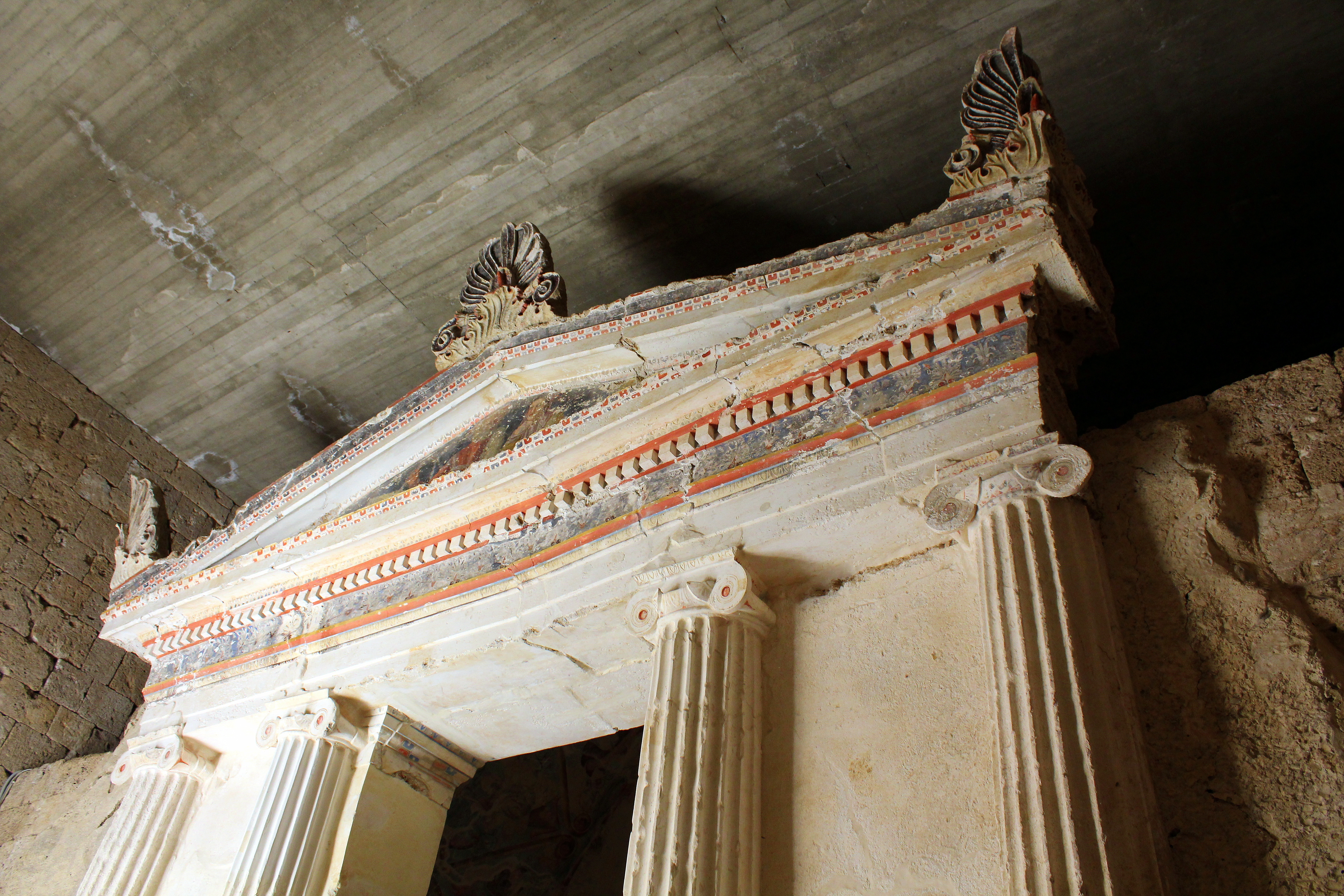
Tomb of the Palmettes (Mieza, Greece), first half of the third century BC

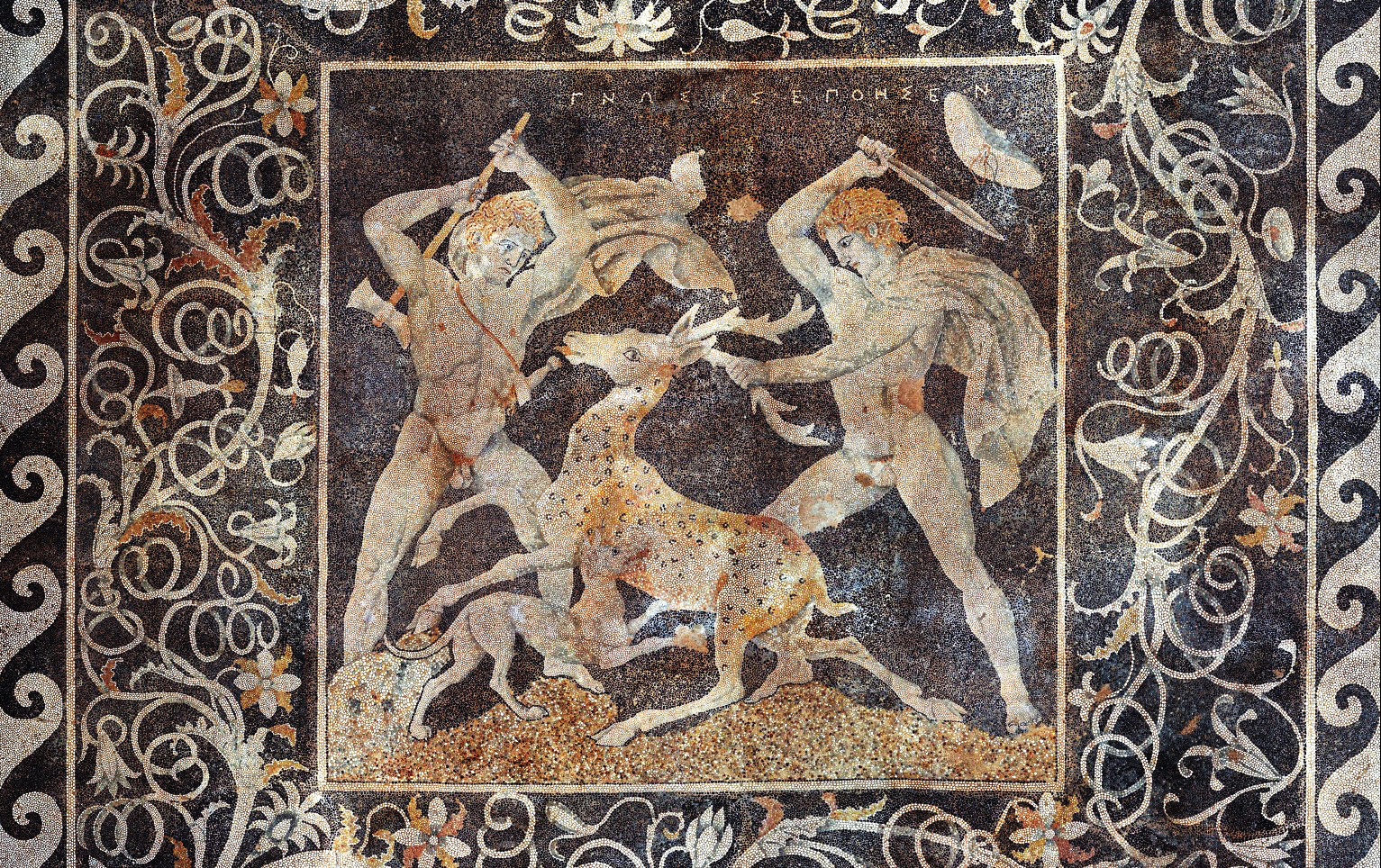
Stag Hunt Mosaic from the House of the Abduction of Helen at Pella, ancient Macedonia, late 4th century BC

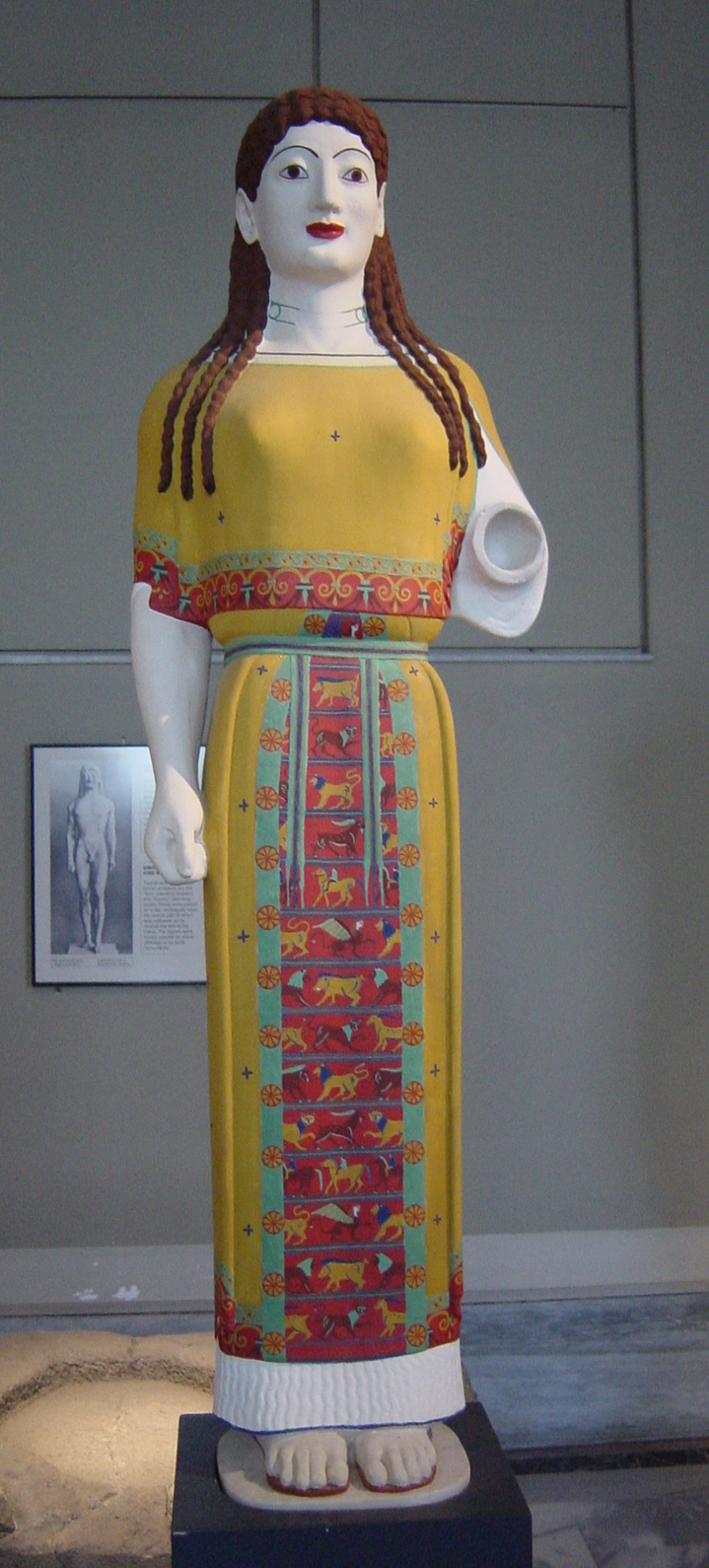
Peplos Kore polychrome reconstruction

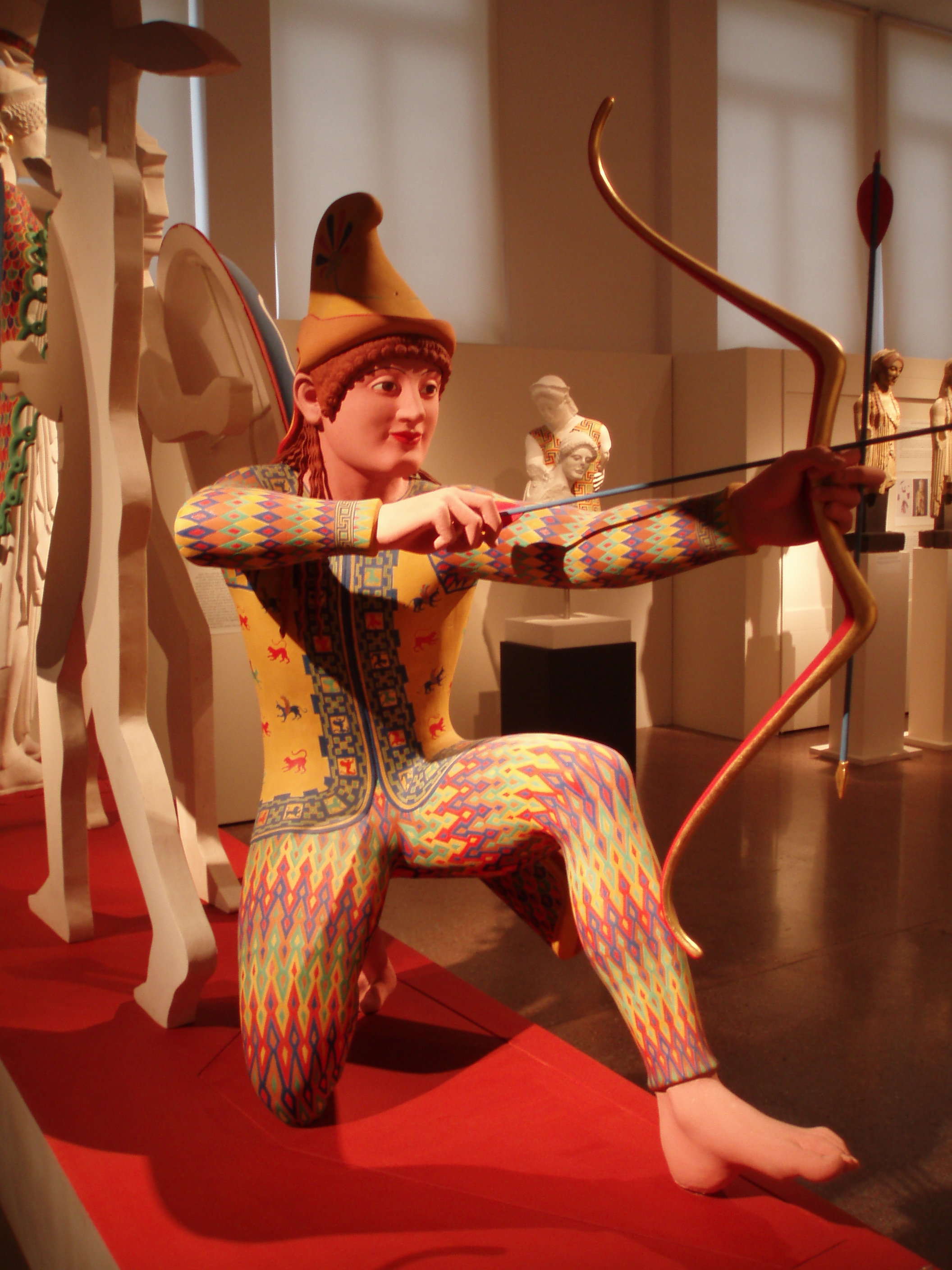
Reconstructed polychrome on a Trojan archer from the Temple of Aphaia, Aegina

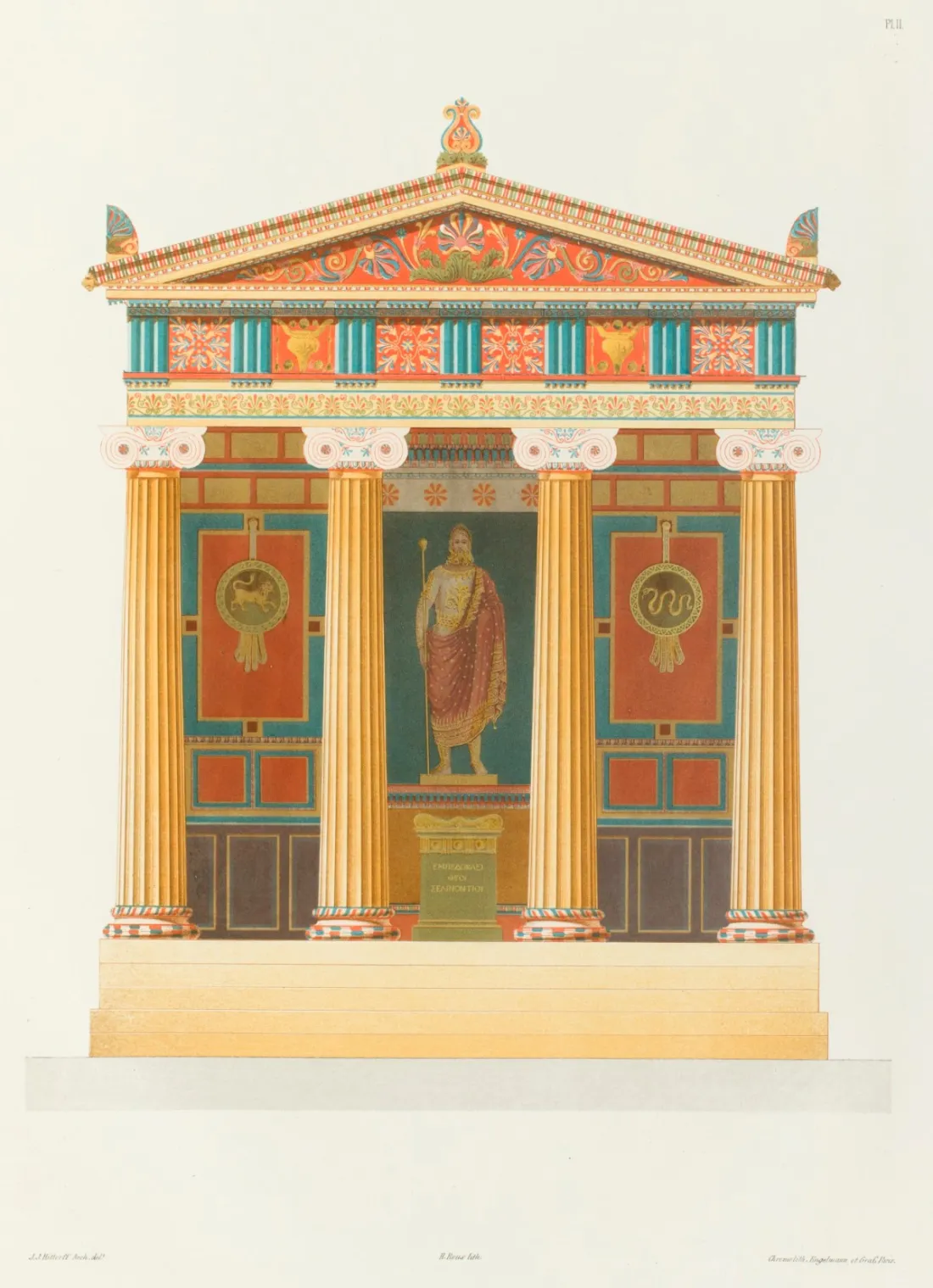
Reconstruction of the Temple of Empedocles at Selinunte, by Jacques Ignace Hittorff, 1830 (published in 1851)

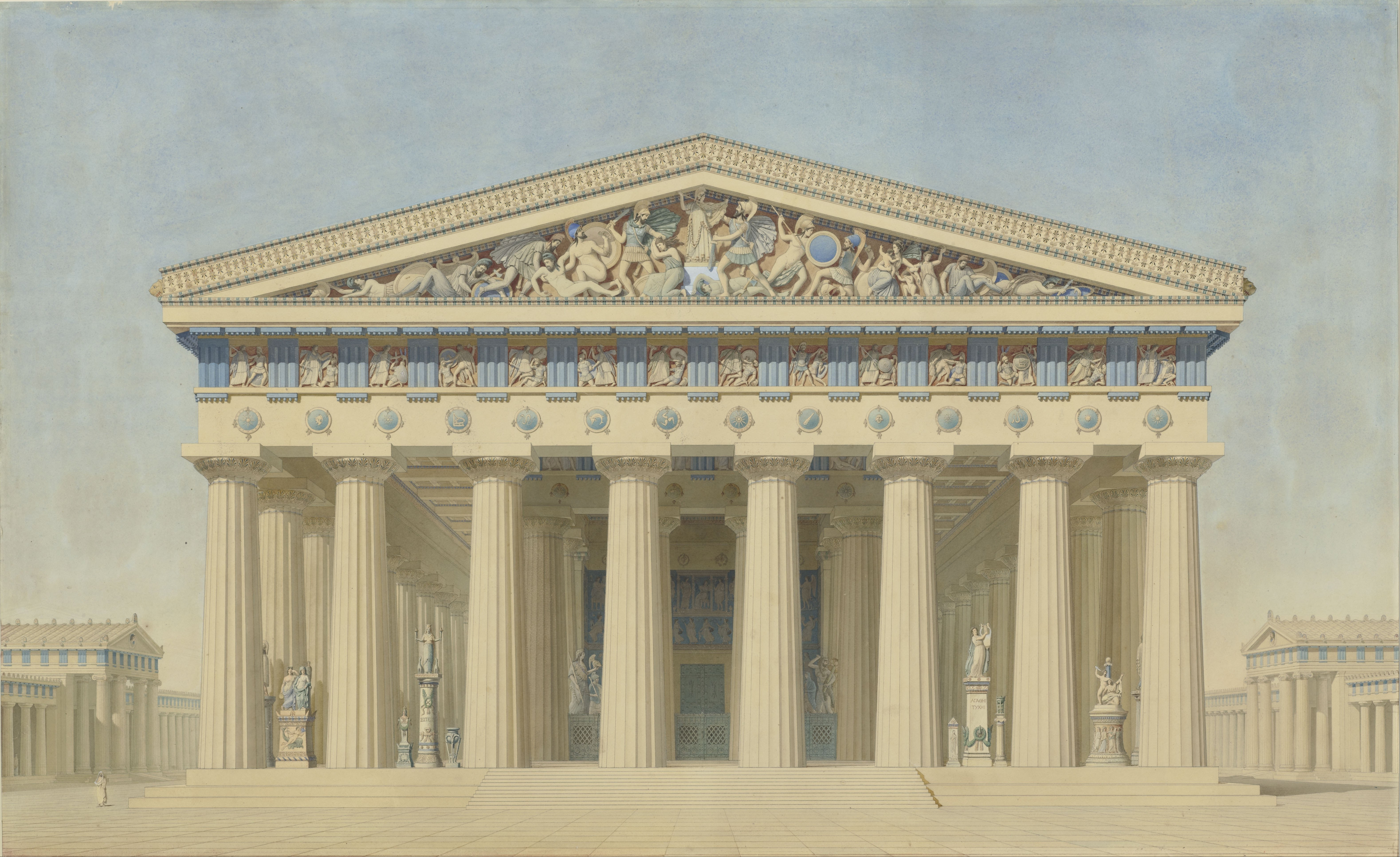
Reconstructed elevation of the main facade of the Temple T at Selinunte, by Jacques Ignace Hittorff, before 1859

=== Ancient Rome ===
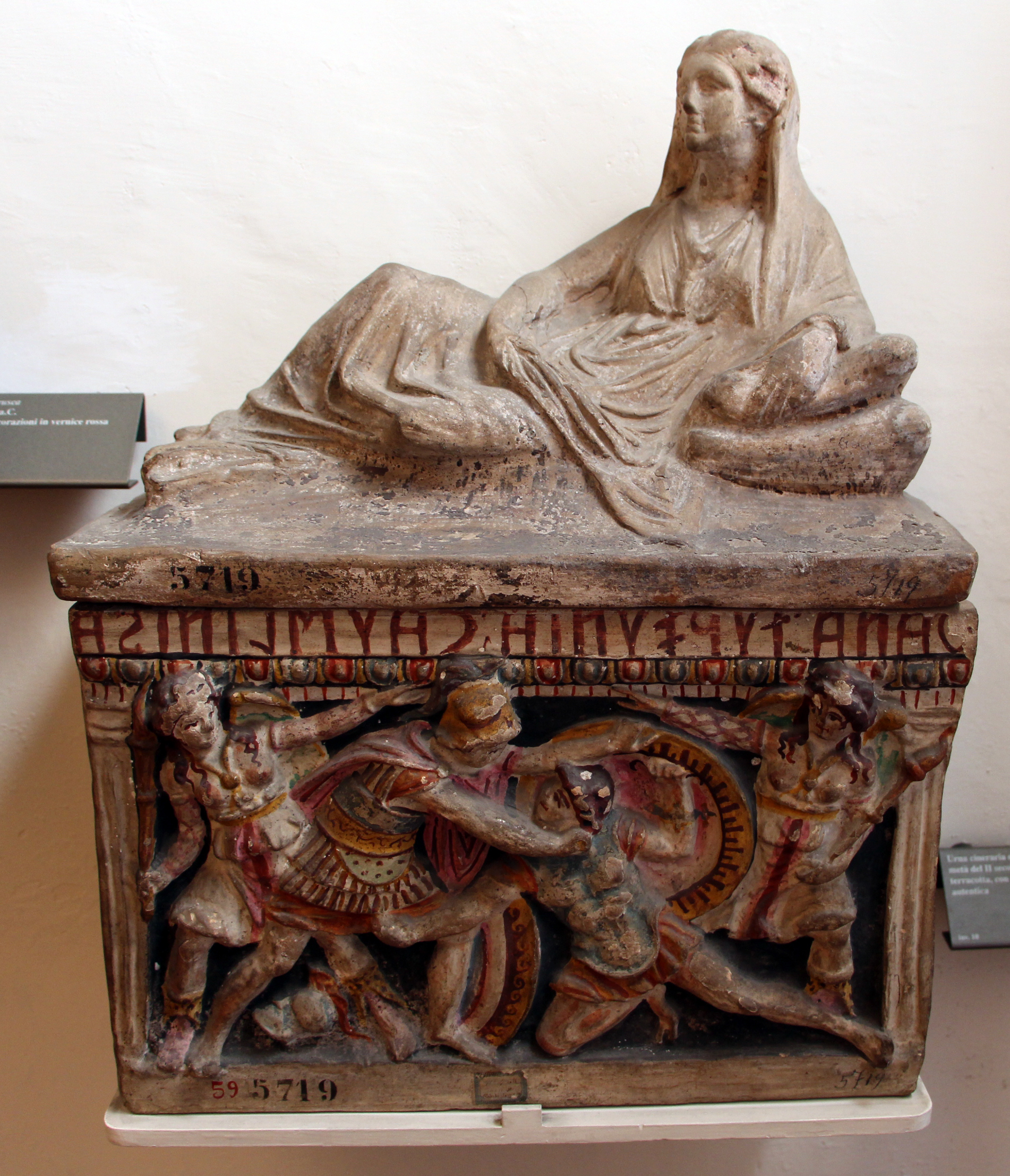
Etruscan funerary urn crowned with the sculpture of a woman and a front-panel relief depicting two warriors fighting, polychrome terracotta, c. 150 BC

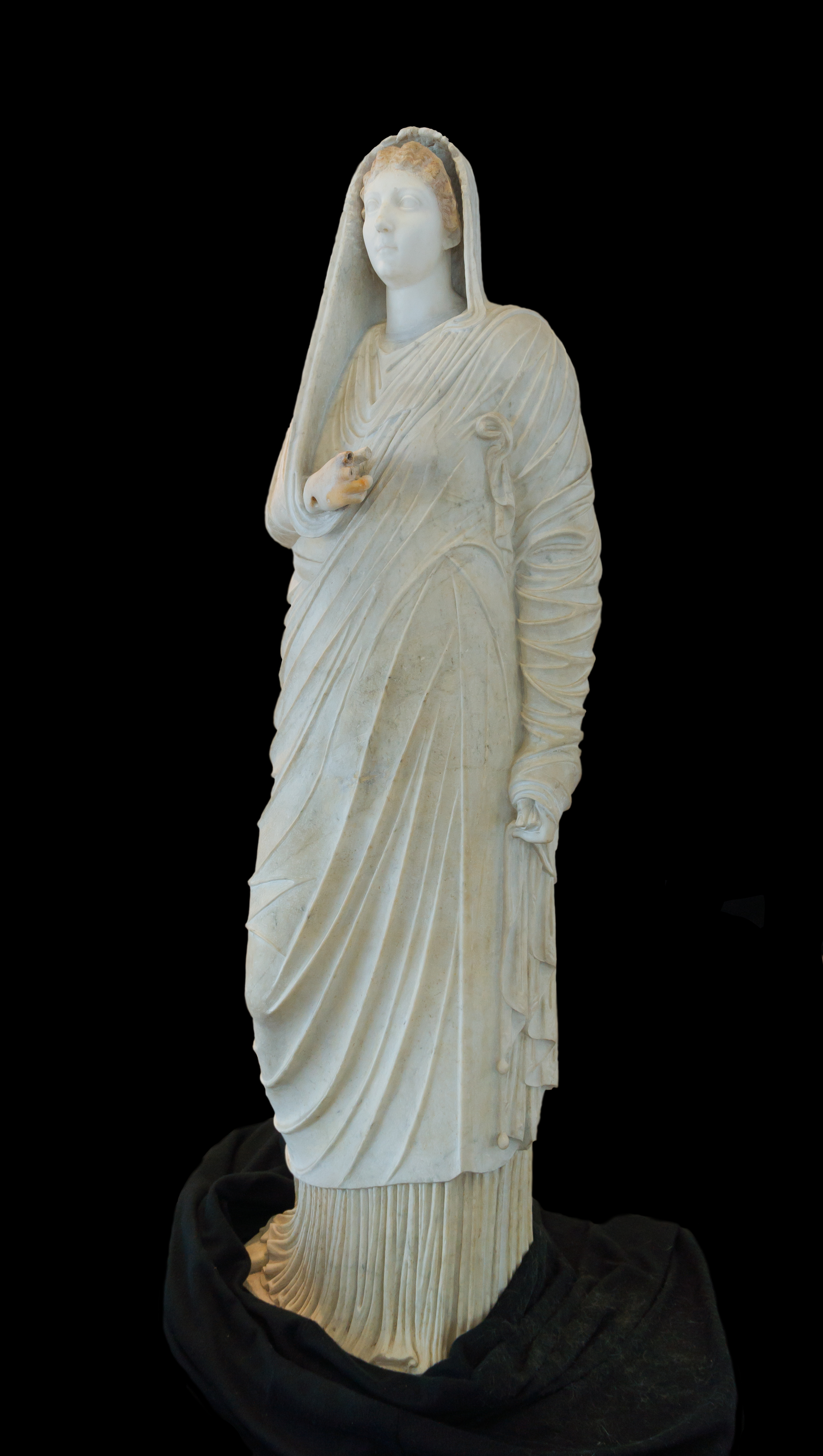
Traces of paint on a statue of Livia, 1st century BCE to 1st century CE, found at Pompeii

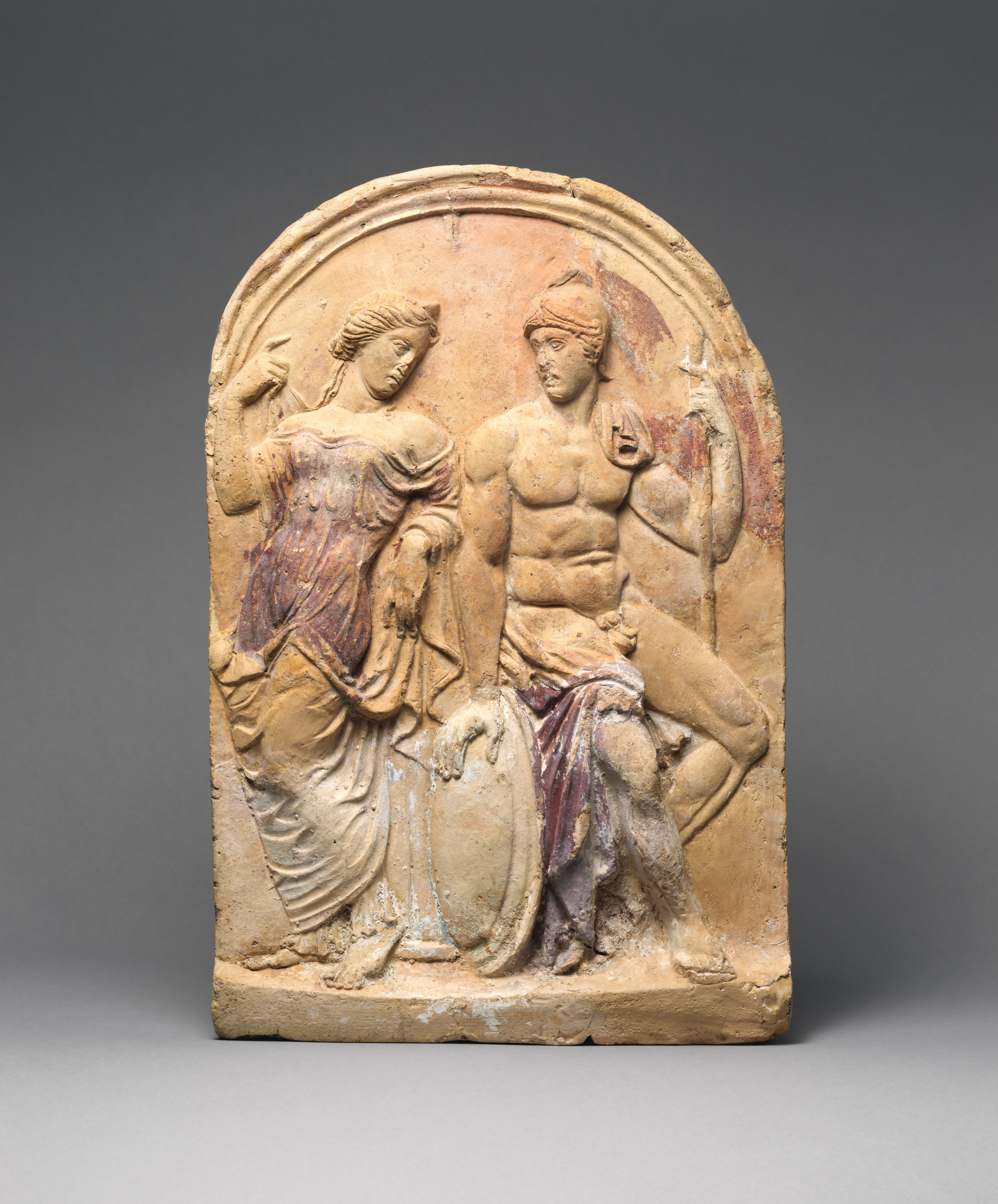
Antefix depicting Venus and her lover Mars, 1st century BCE to 1st century CE, painted terracotta, MET

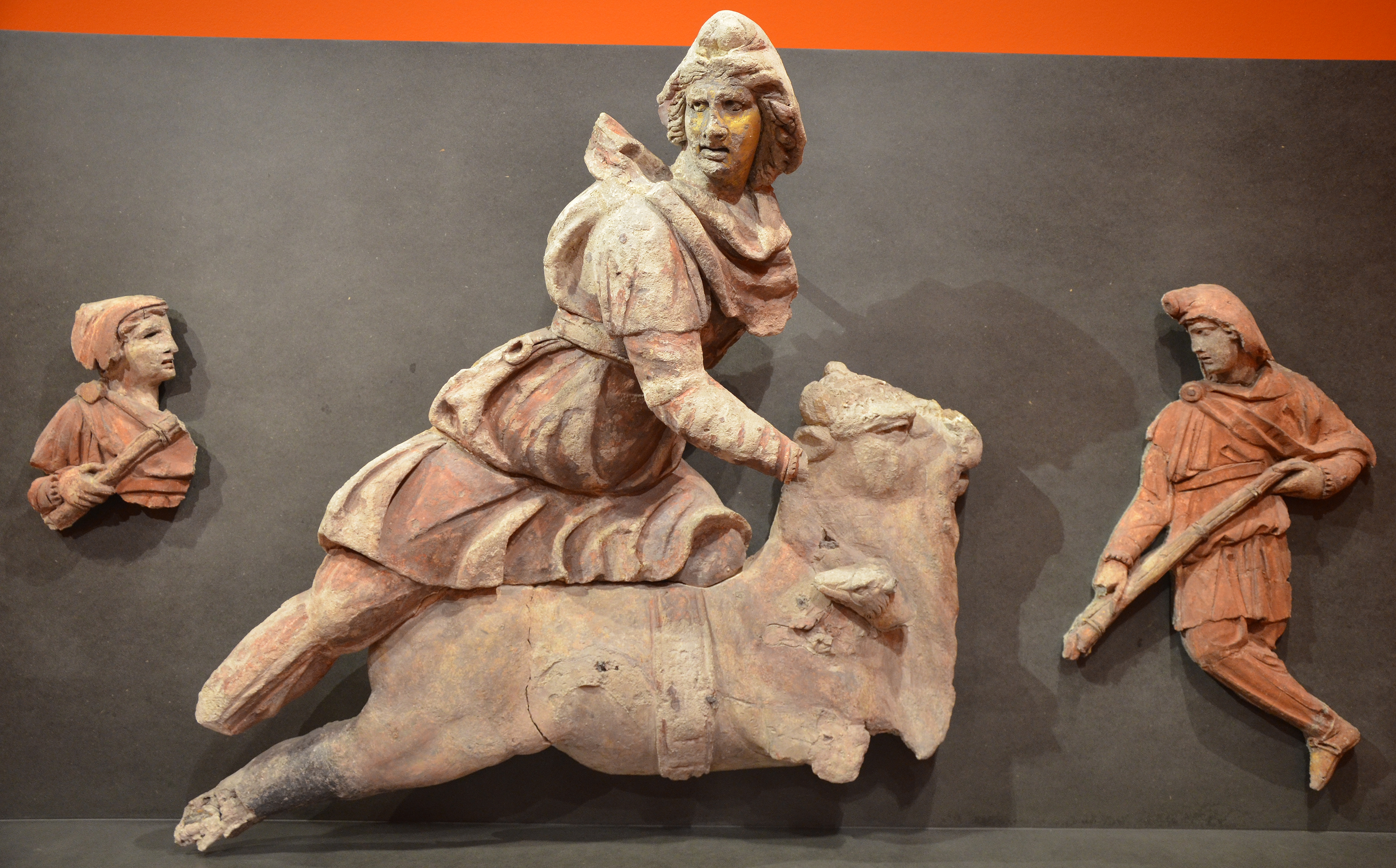
Reliefs of Mithras killing a bull and Cautes and Cautopates holding torches, from Rome, c. 200 AD, gilded plaster

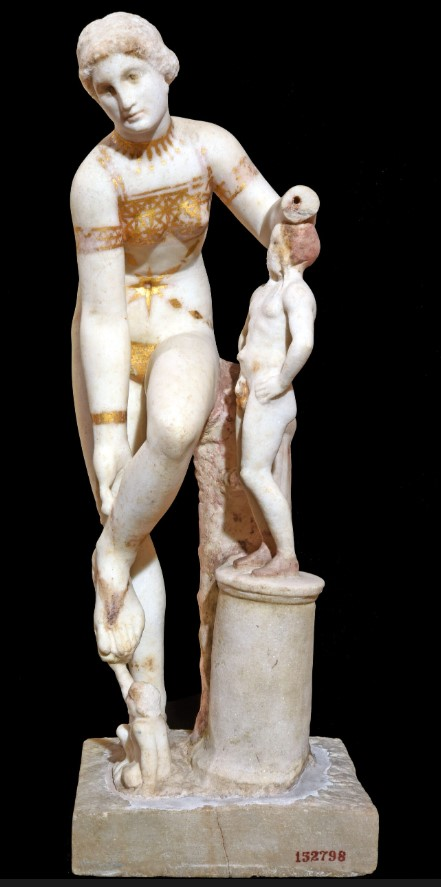
The so-called "Venus in a bikini" statuette from Pompeii, depicting her Greek counterpart Aphrodite, marble with traces of gilding and paint, 1st-century AD, MANN

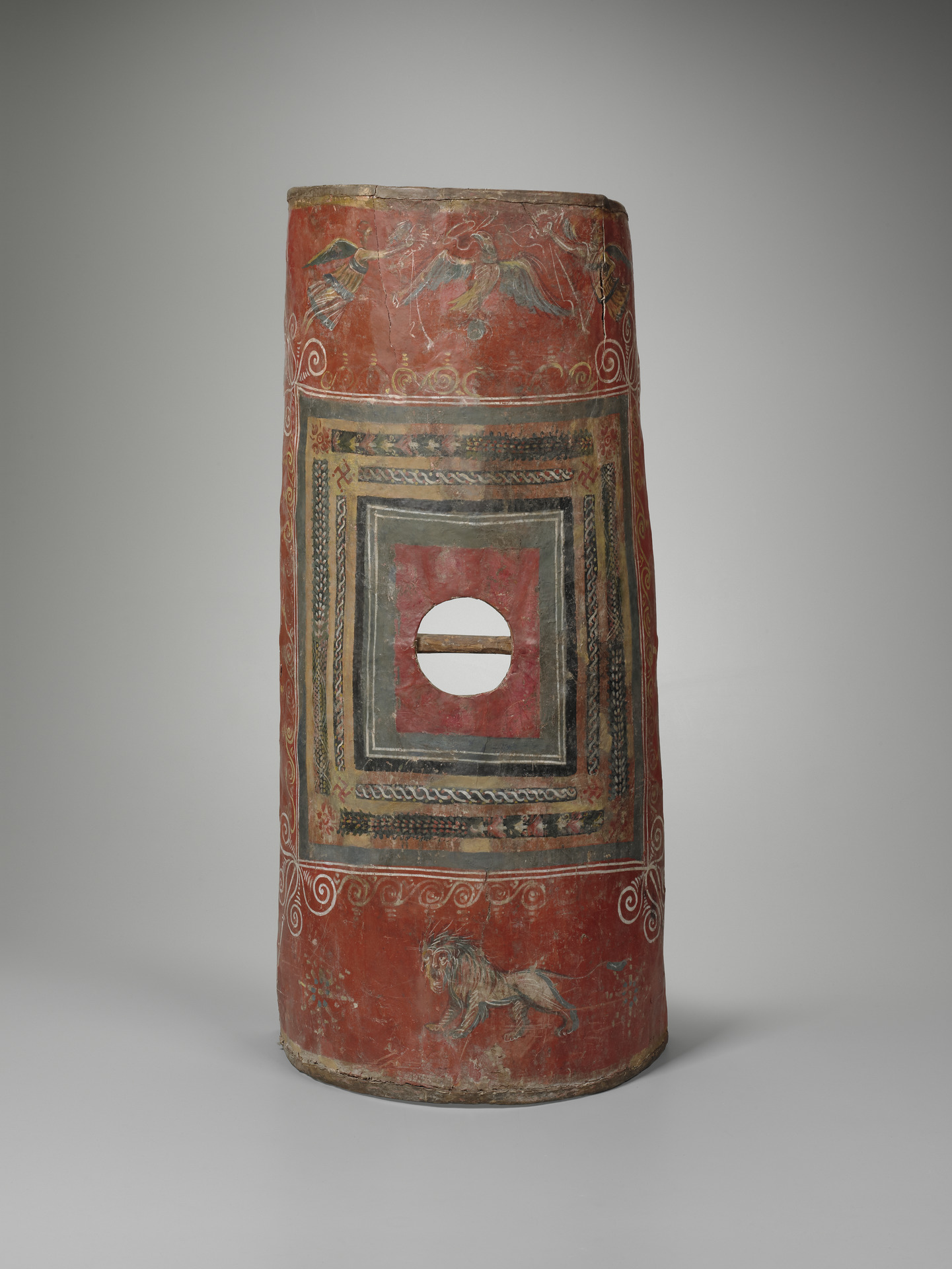
The Roman scutum from Dura-Europos, mid-3rd century, painted wood and hide, Yale University Art Gallery, New Haven, US

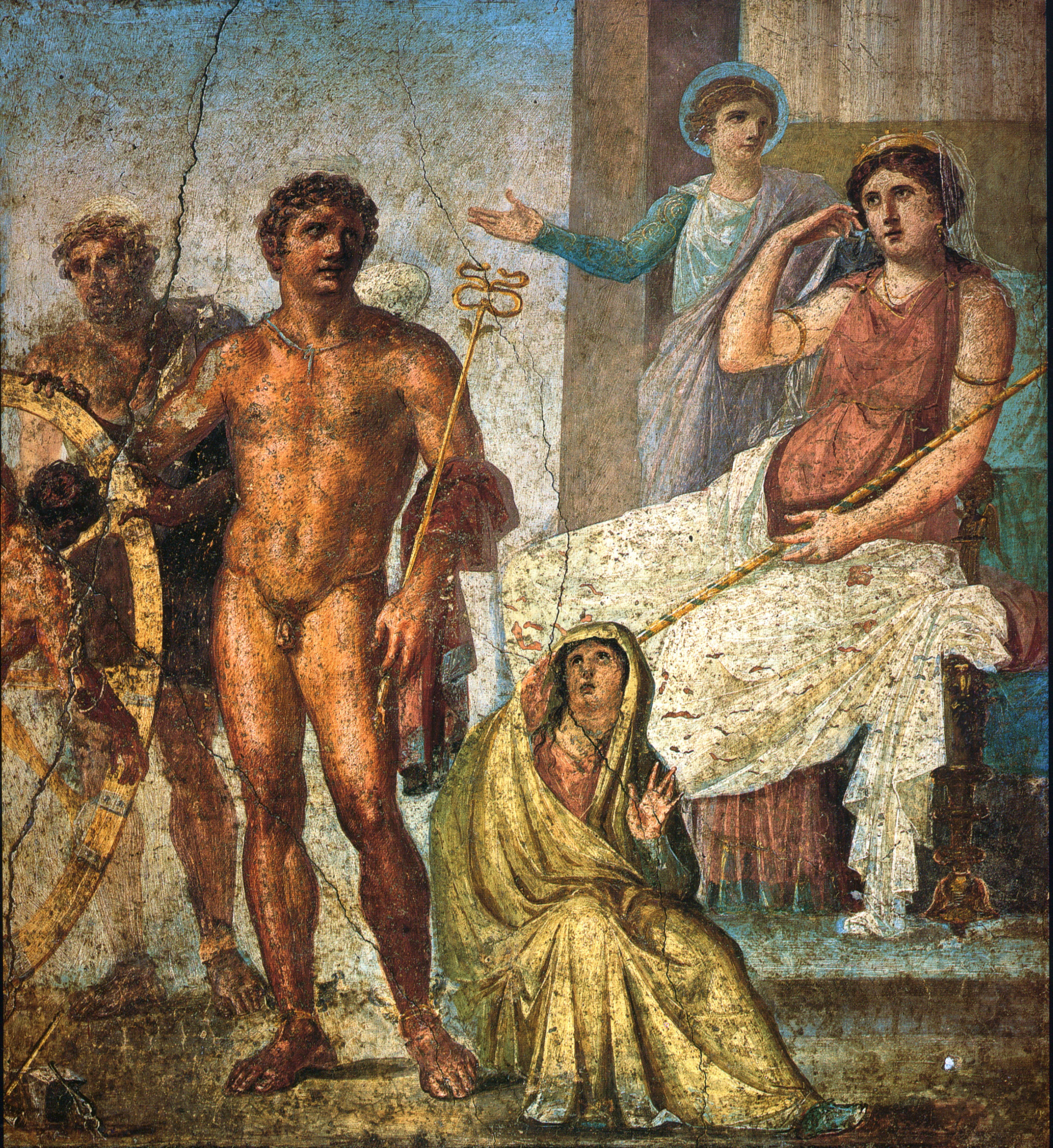
Roman fresco depicting the punishment of Ixion, House of the Vettii, Pompeii

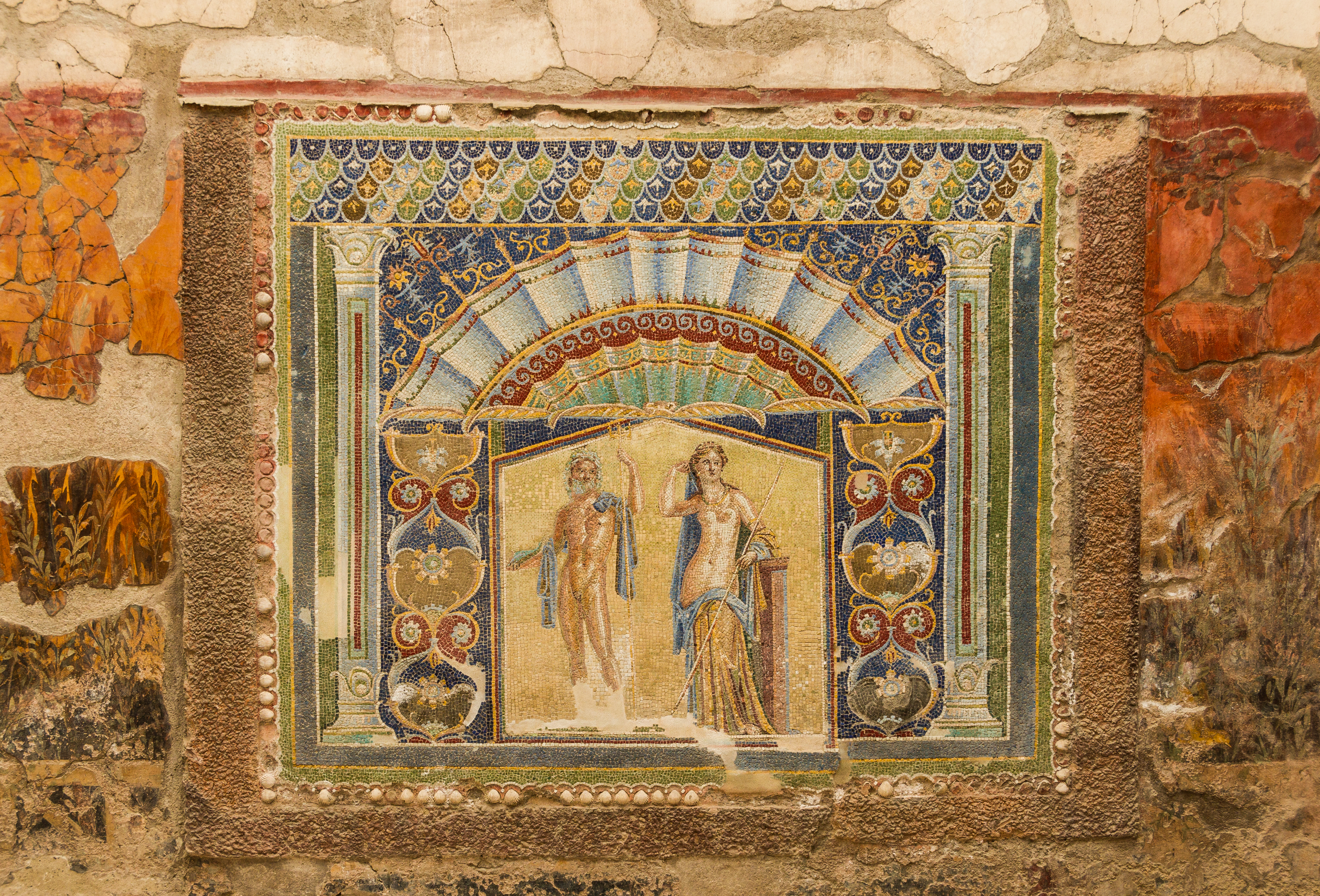
Roman mosaic of Neptune and Amphitrite, c. 70 BC, mosaic, Casa di Nettuno e Anfitrite, Herculaneum Archaeological Park, Ercolano, Italy

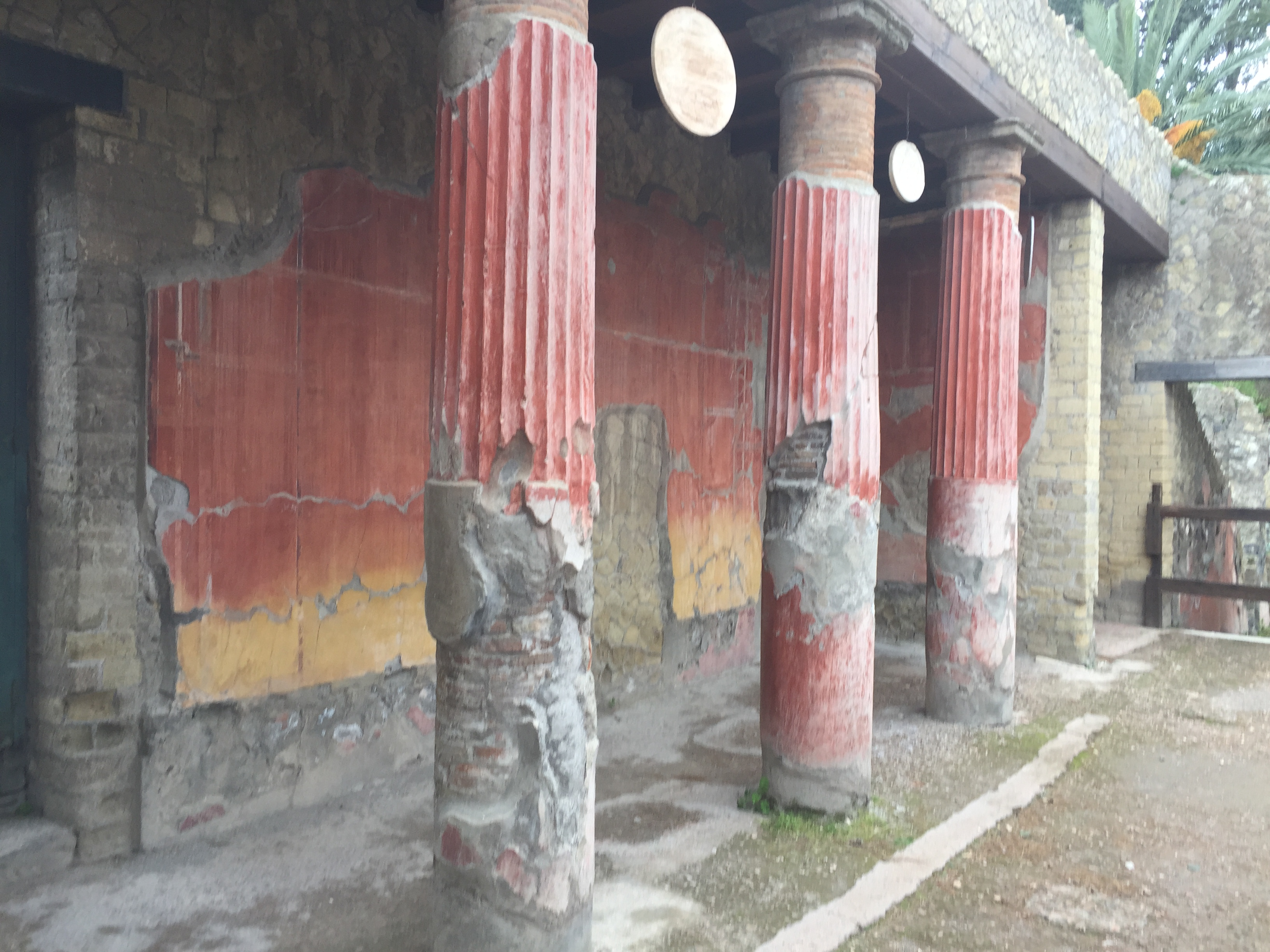
Columns from the House of the Relief of Telephus at Herculaneum, with preserved red paint

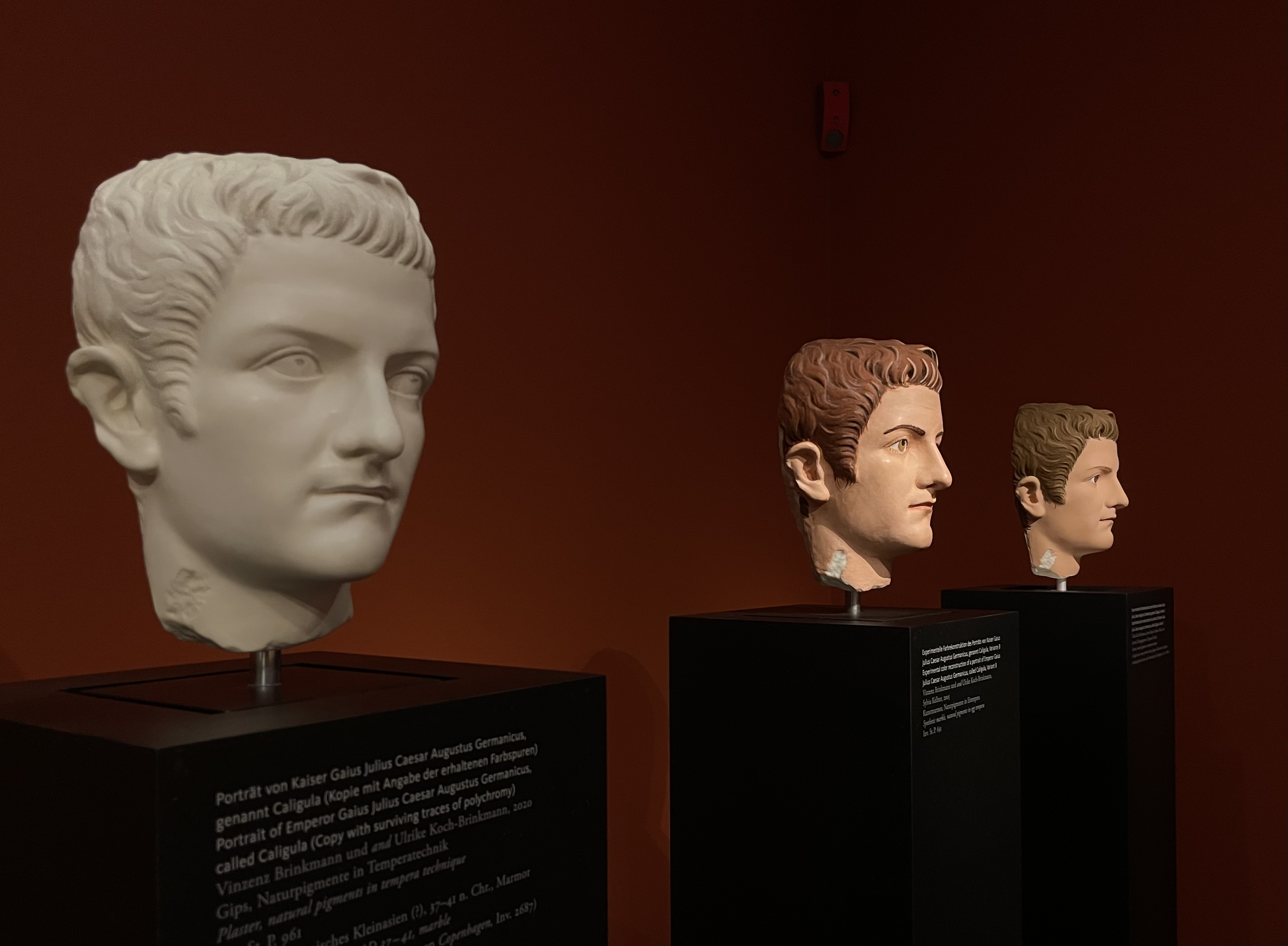
Experimental polychrome reconstructions of a head of Caligula; from the Gods in Color exhibition

== East Asia ==
Chinese art is known for the use of vibrant colours. Neolithic Chinese ceramic vessels, like those produced by the Yangshao culture, show the use of black and red pigments. Later, tomb and religious sculptures appear as a consequence of the spread of Buddhism. The deities most common in Chinese Buddhist sculpture are forms of the Buddha and the bodhisattva Guanyin. Traces of gold and bright colours in which sculptures were painted still give an idea of their effect. During the Han and Tang dynasties, polychrome ceramic figurines of servants, entertainers, tenants, and soldiers were placed in the tombs of people from upper-class. These figurines were mass-produced in moulds. Although Chinese porcelain is best known as being blue-and-white, many colorful ceramic vases and figures were produced during the Ming and Qing dynasties. During the same two dynasties, cloisonné vessels that use copper wires (cloisons) and bright enamel were also manufactured.

Similarly to what was happening in China, the introduction of Buddhism in Japan in 538 (or perhaps 552 AD) lead to the production of polychrome Japanese Buddhist sculptures. Japanese religious imagery had until then consisted of disposable clay figures used to convey prayers to the spirit world.

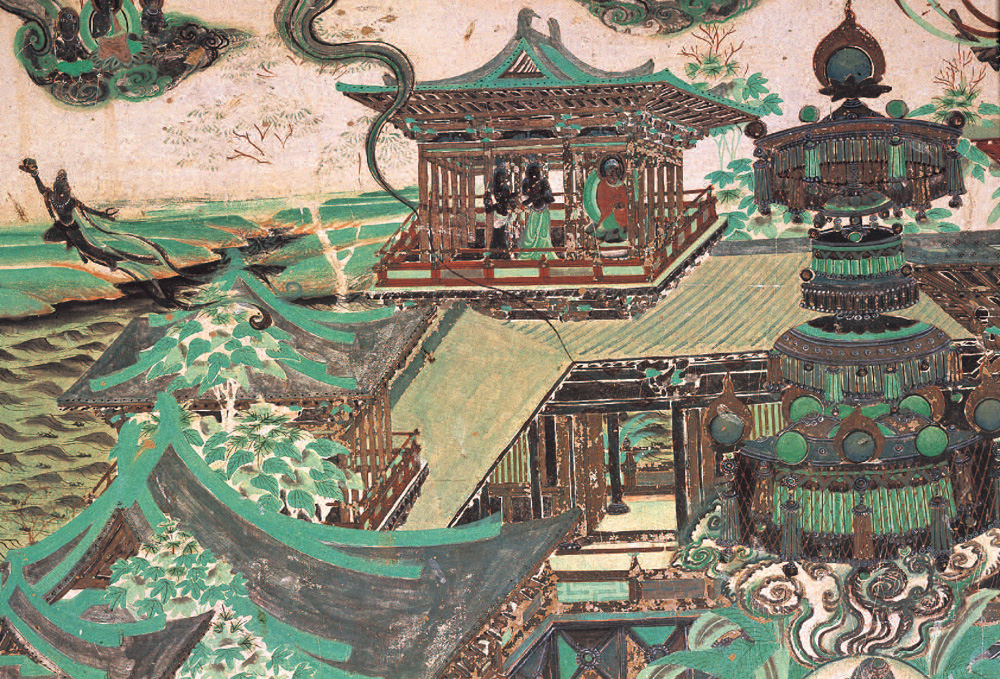
Tang dynasty mural of architecture from Mogao Grottoes

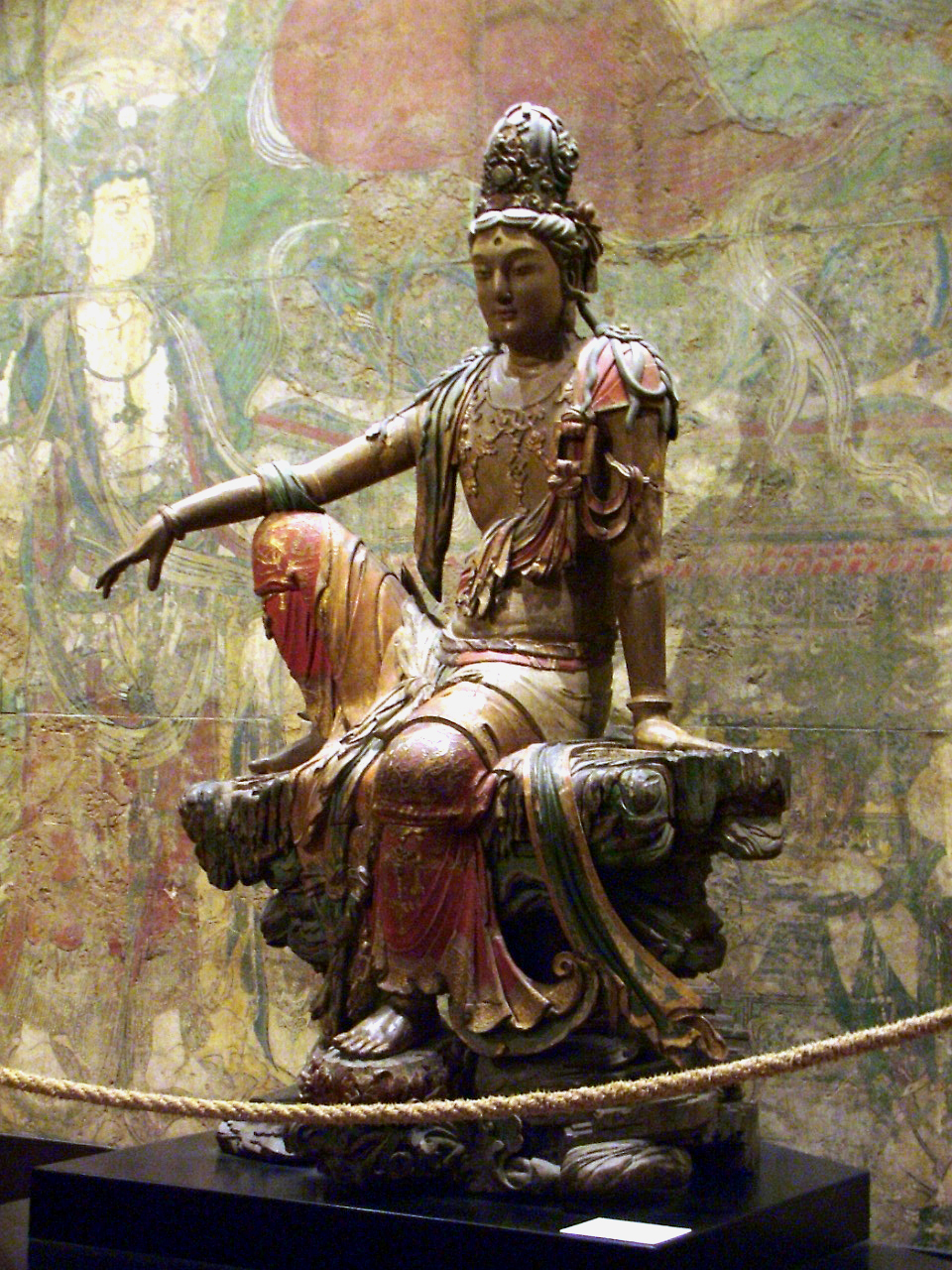
Guanyin of the southern seas (Chinese), 11th–12th centuries, painted and gilded wood, Nelson-Atkins Museum of Art, Kansas City, US

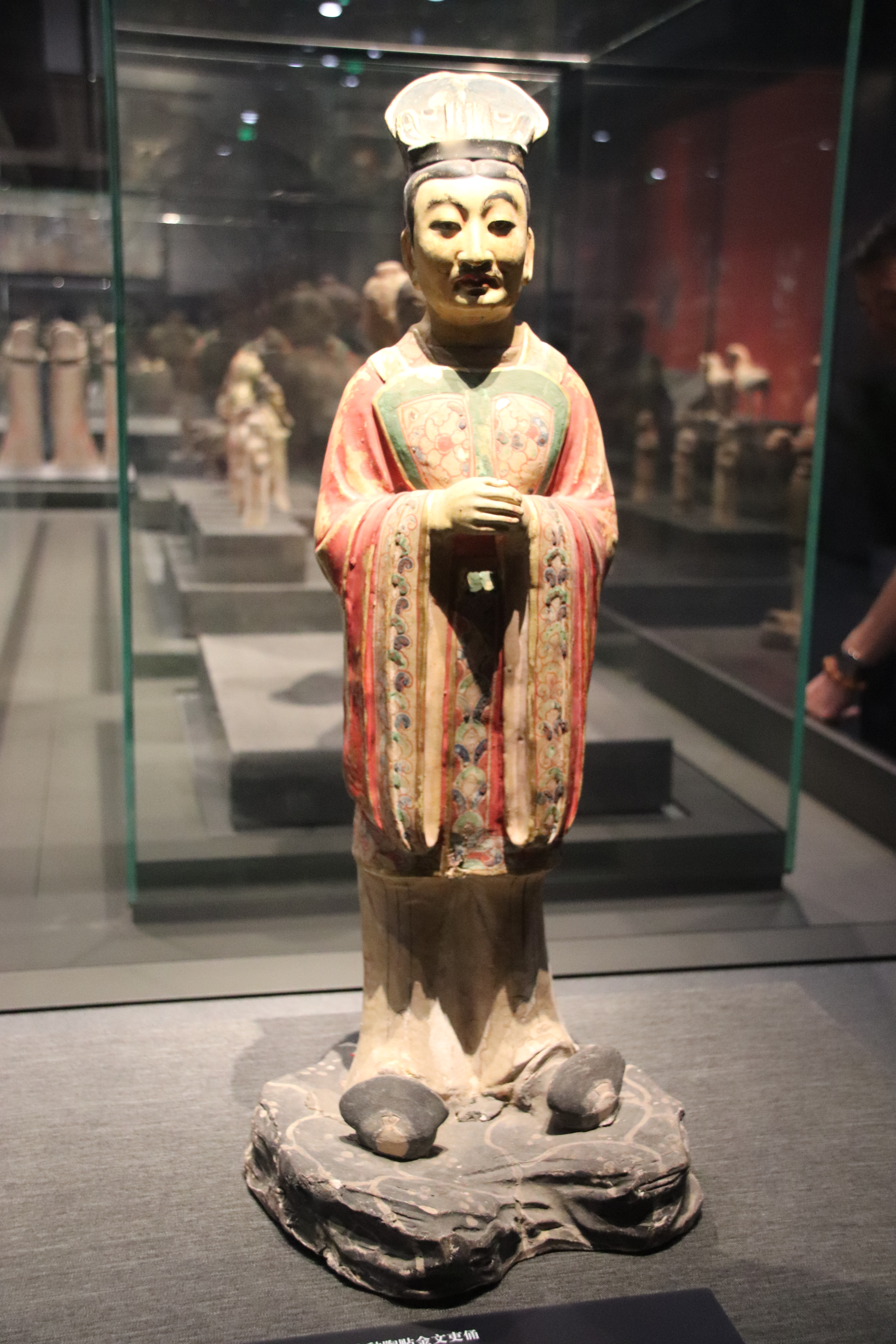
Scholar oficial (Chinese), 618–907 AD, painted and glazed ceramic, Shaanxi History Museum, Xi'an, China

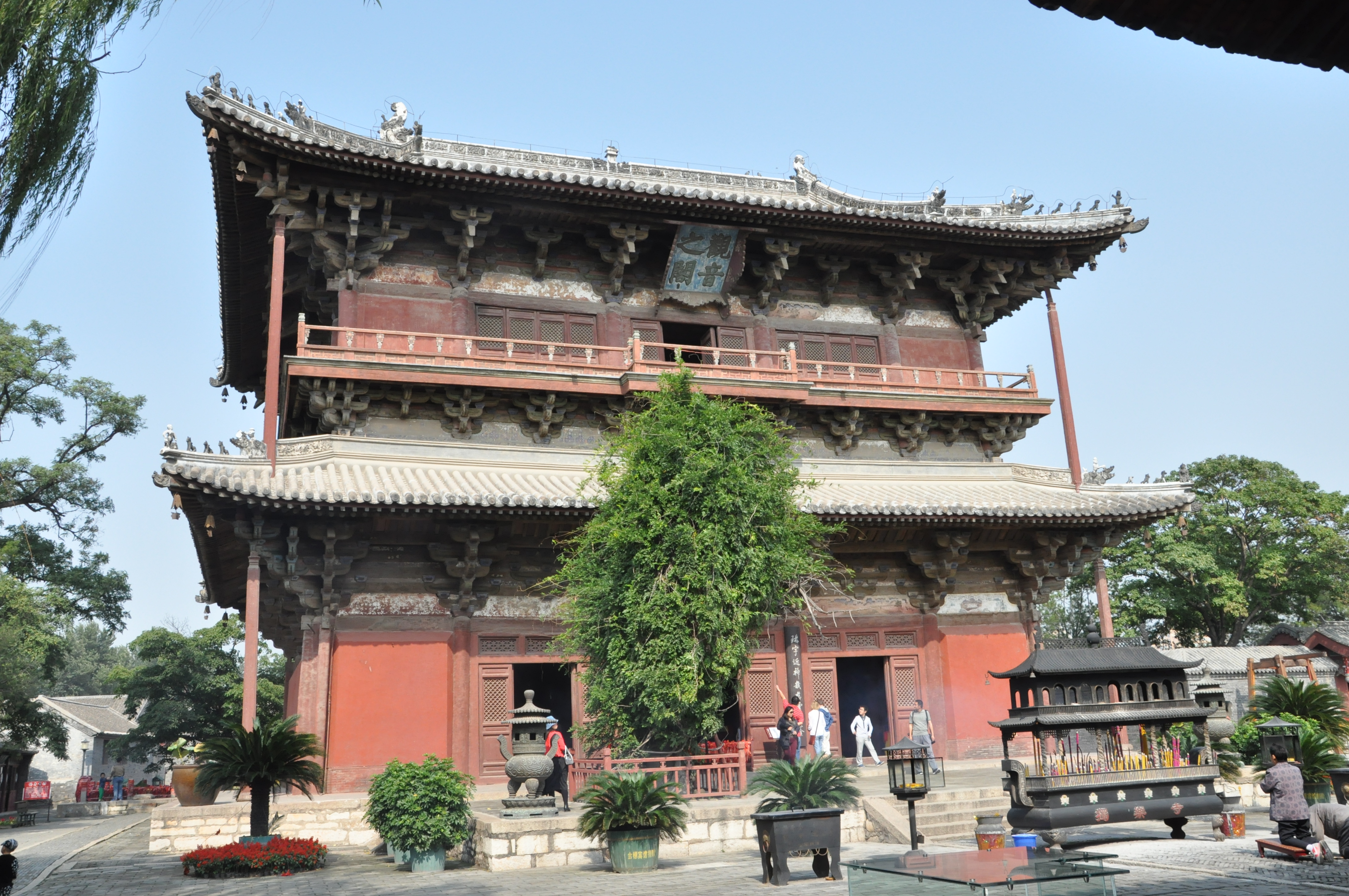
The Guanyian Pavilion of the Dule Monastery, Jixian, China, unknown architect, 984

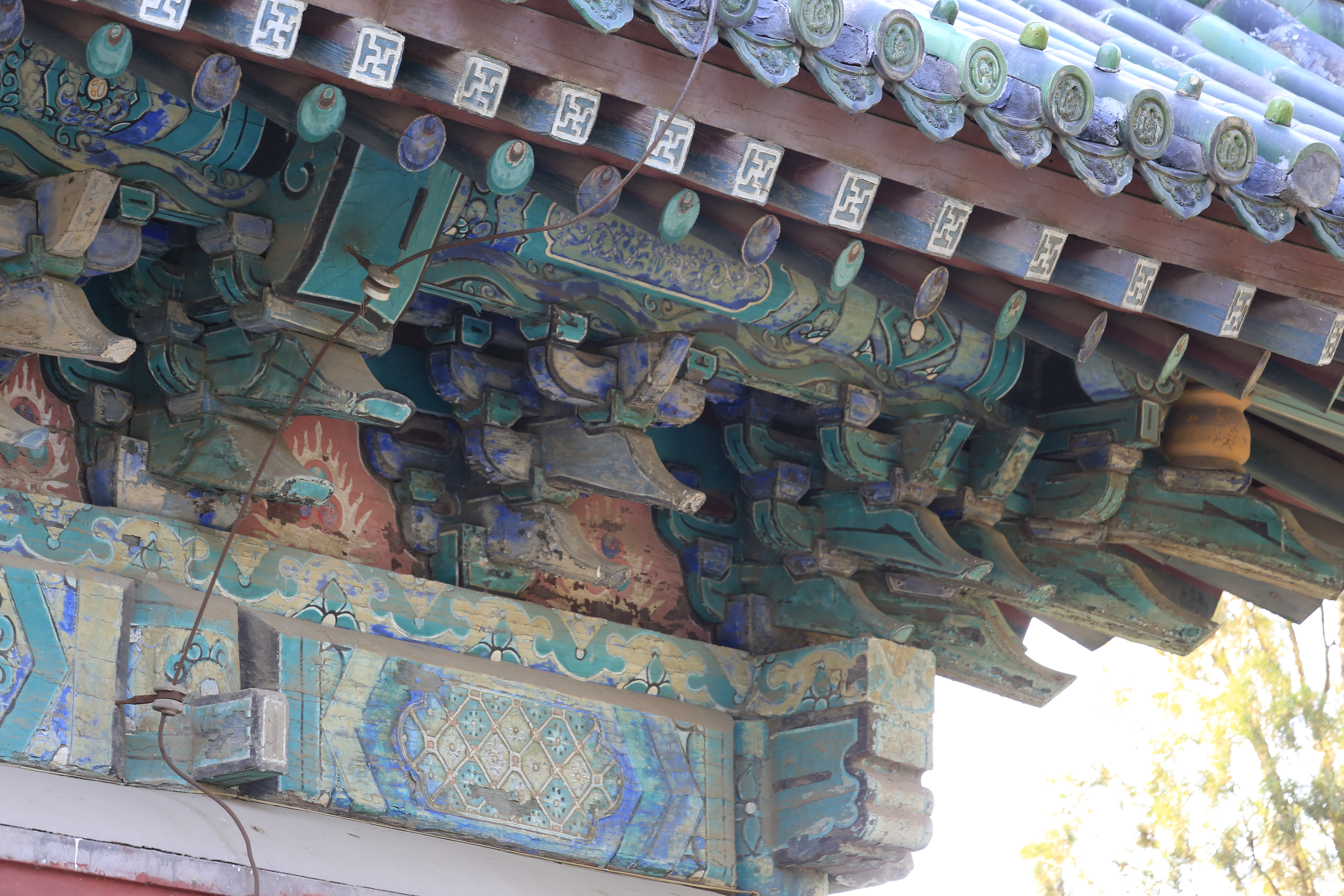
Ming dynasty caihua decorations on Hall of Amitābha at Longxing Temple

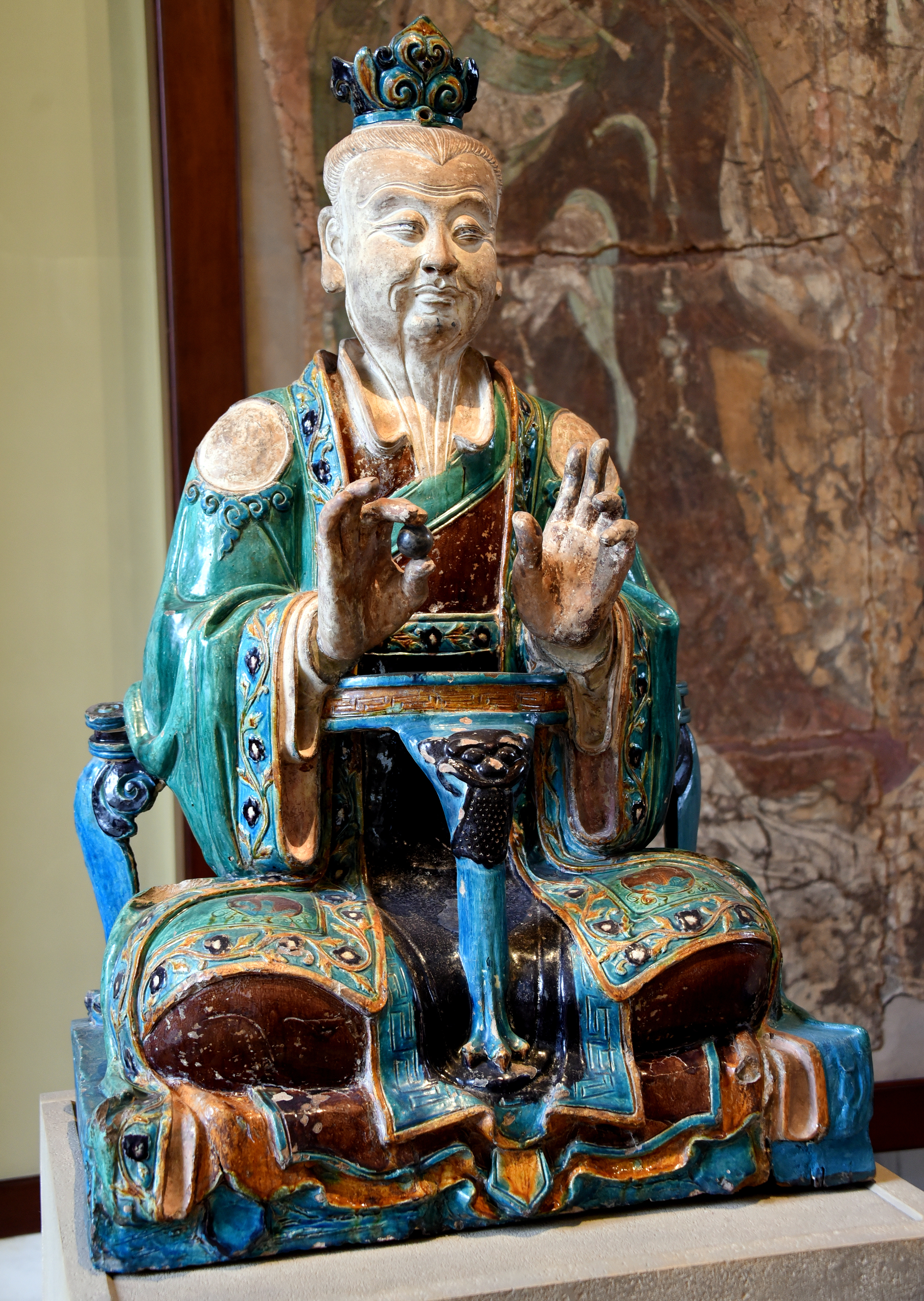
Figure of a Daoist deity (Chinese), c. 1488 – c. 1644, porcelain, British Museum, London

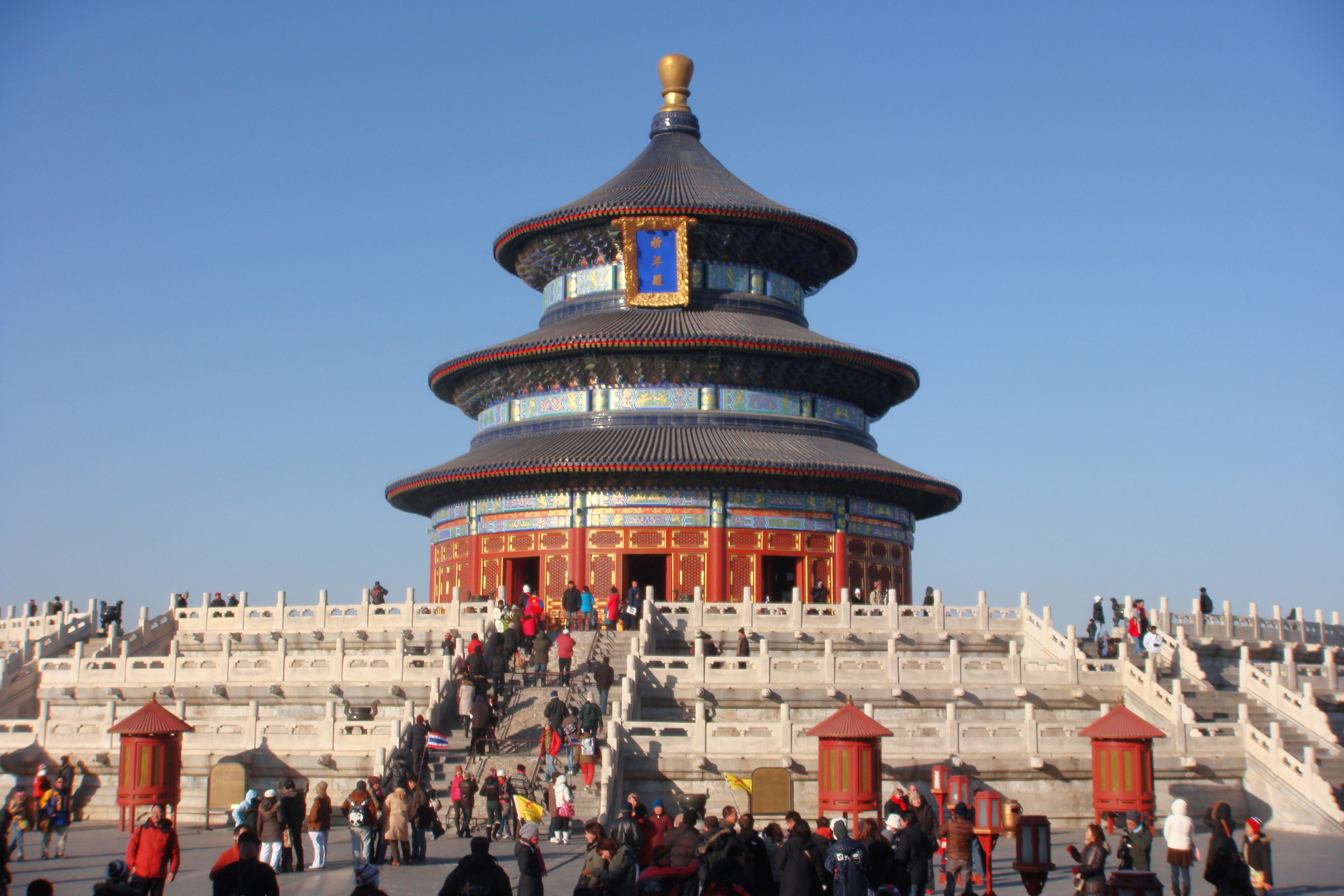
Hall of Prayer for Good Harvests, the main building of the Temple of Heaven, Beijing, unknown architect, 1703–1790

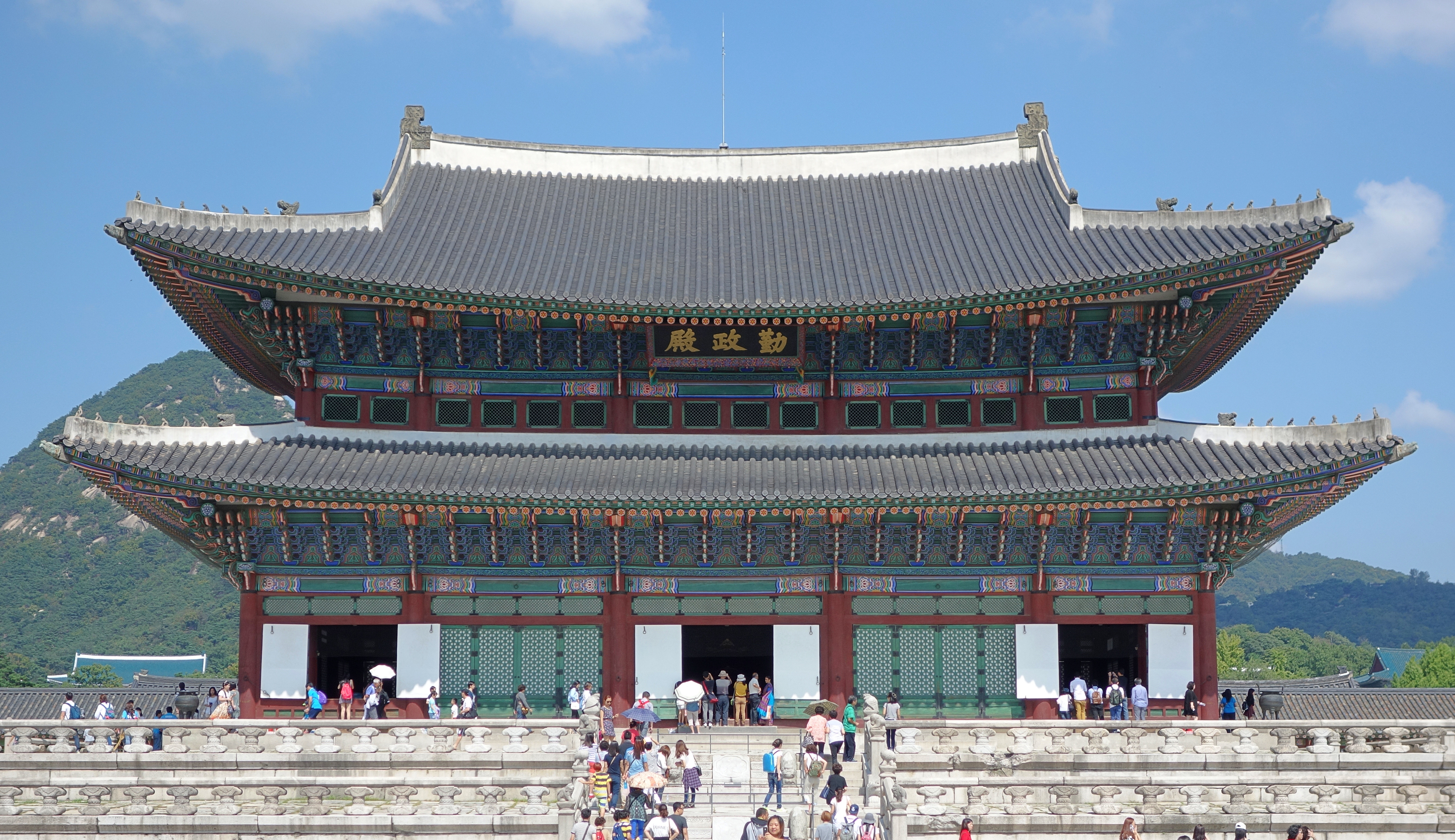
Geunjeongjeon, the main hall of the Gyeongbokgung, Seoul, South Korea, unknown architect, 1866–1867

Edo Period wood carving at the lintel of the main entrance of Ninomaru Palace, Nijō Castle, Kyoto, Japan

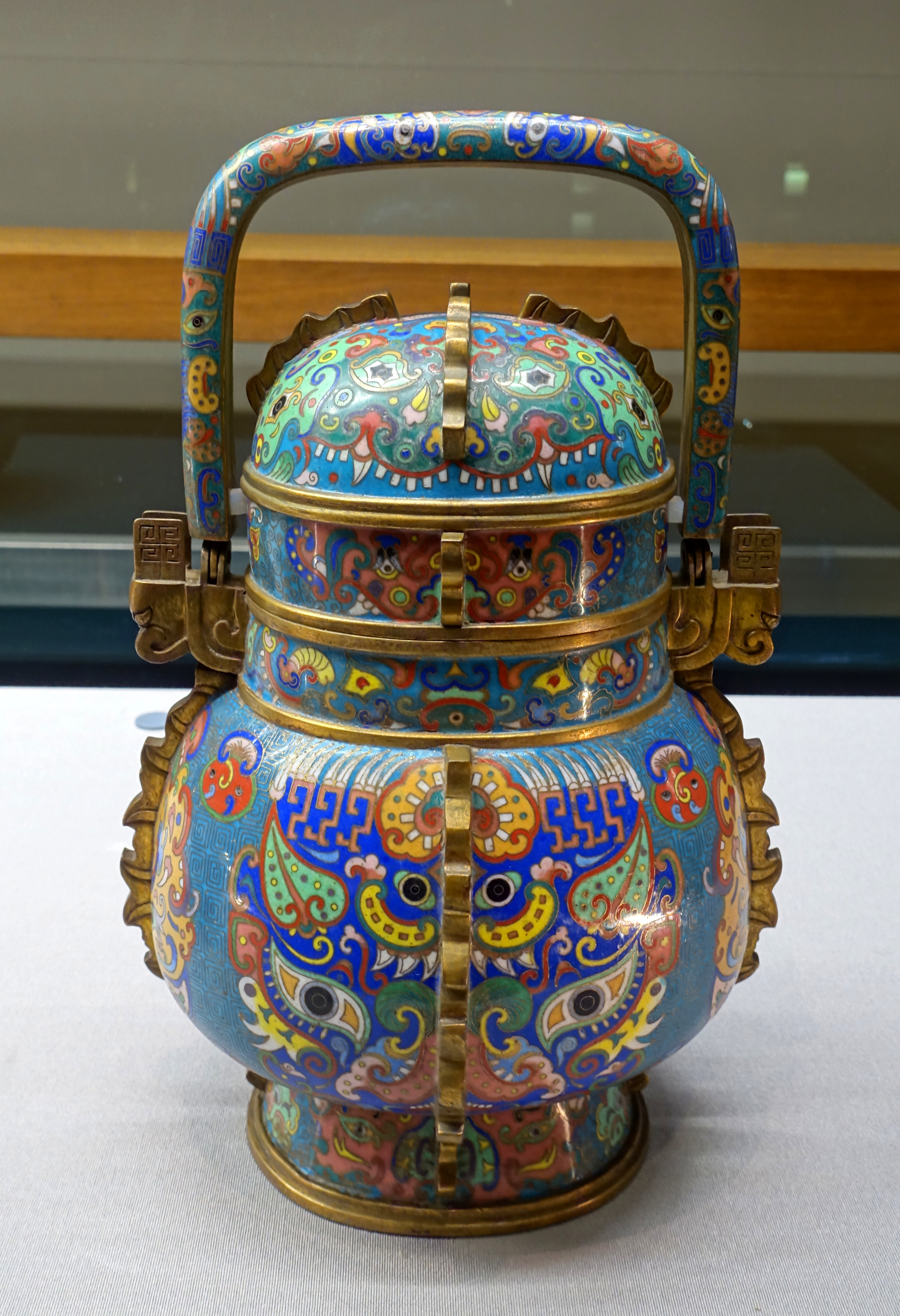
You (Chinese), 19th century, cloisonné, Tokyo National Museum, Tokyo, Japan

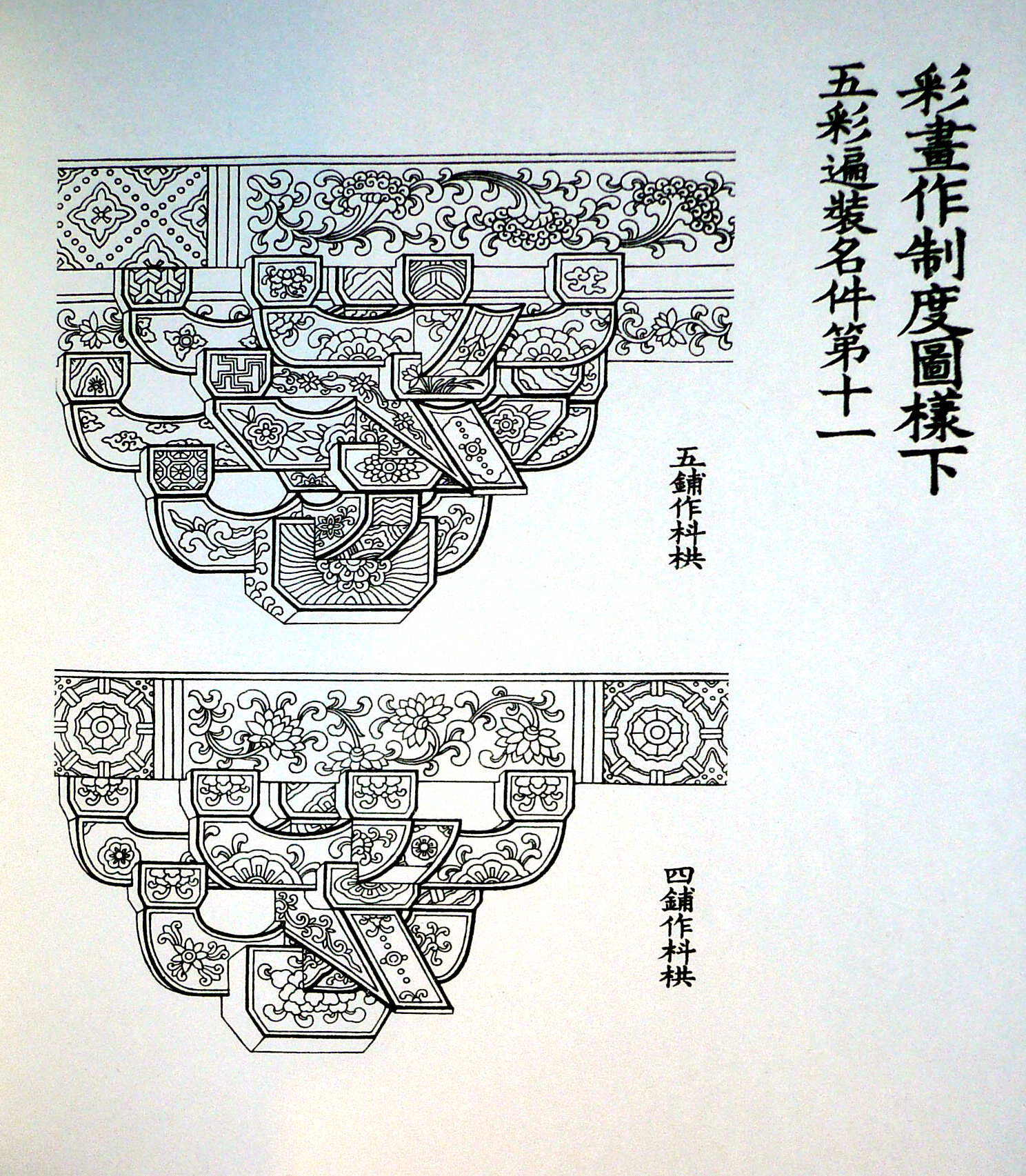
Song dynasty "Wucai Caihua" (Five Coloured Painting)-dougong decorations guide as detailed on the Yingzao Fashi

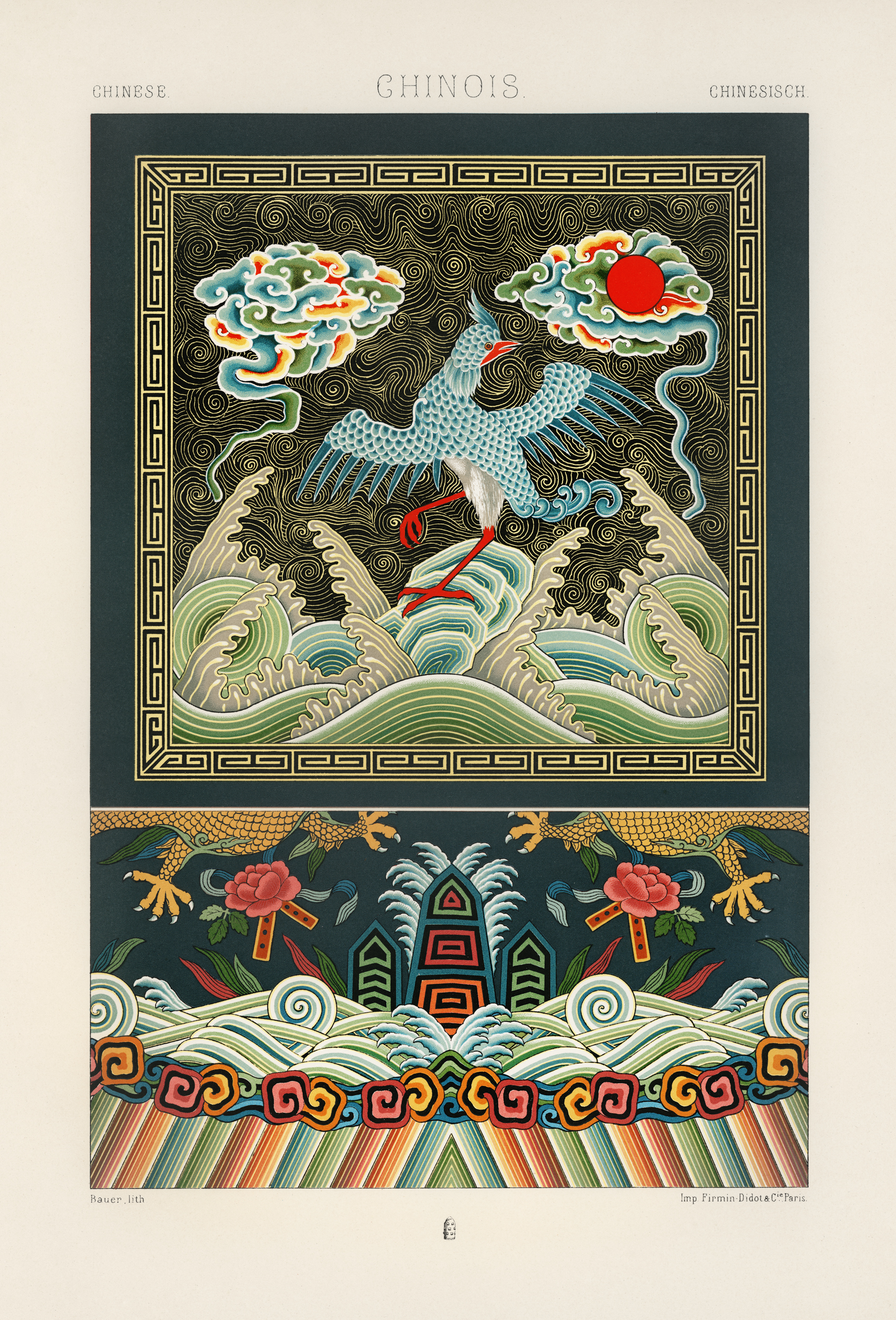
Chinese motifs from L'Ornement Polychrome, by Albert Racinet, 1888

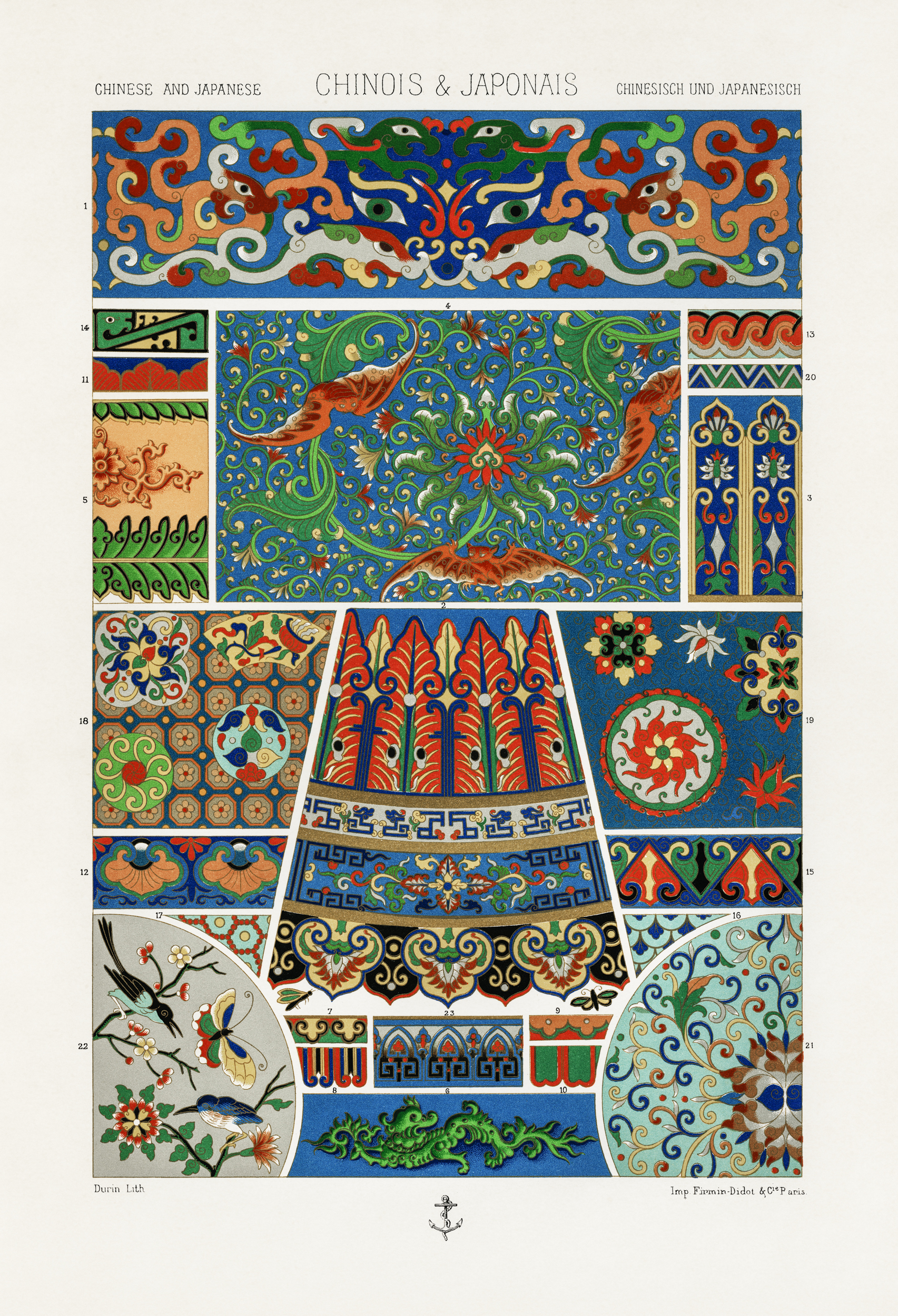
Chinese and Japanese cloisonné motifs from L'Ornement Polychrome

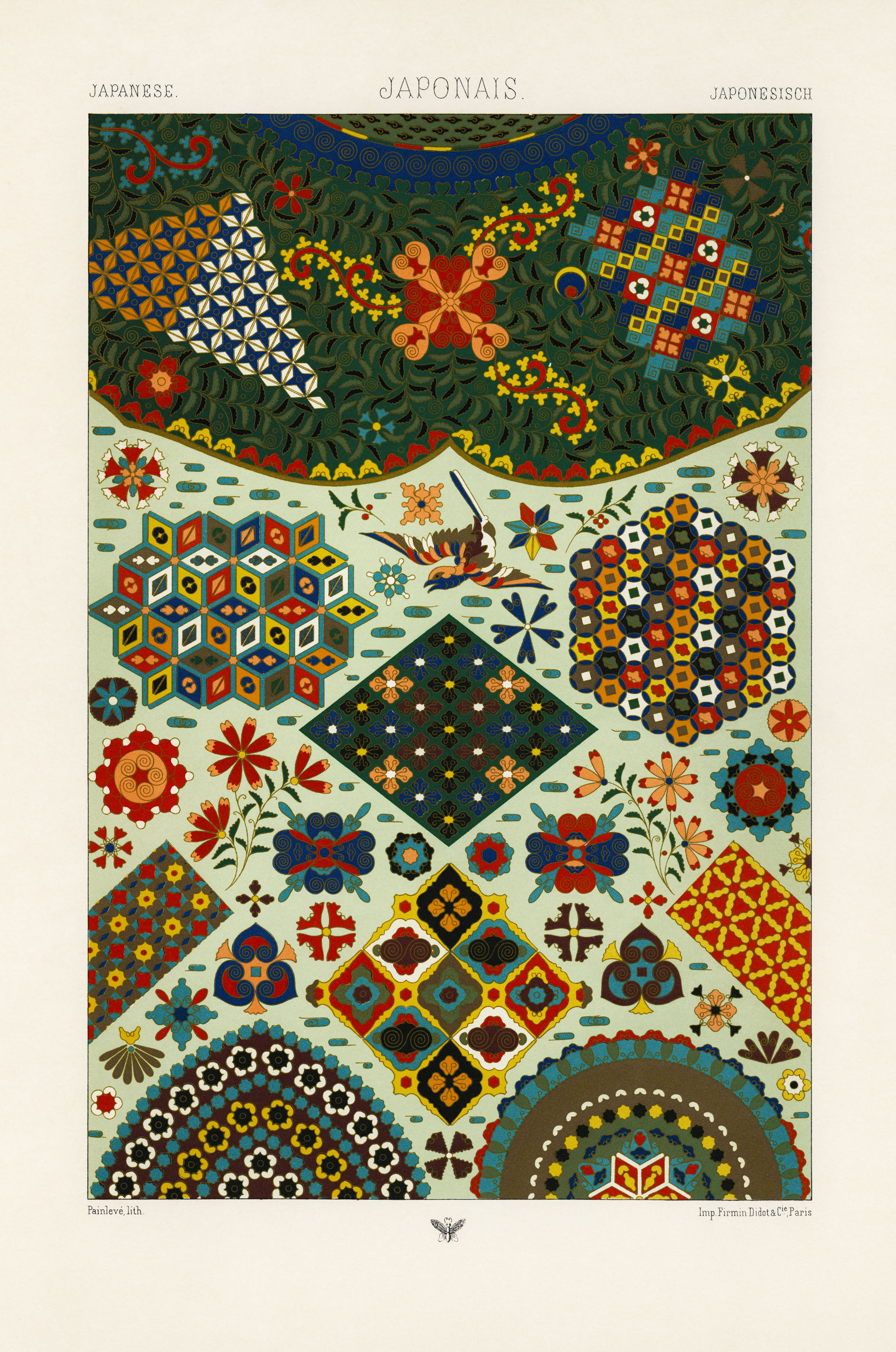
Japanese cloisonné motifs from L'Ornement Polychrome

== Medieval ==
Throughout medieval Europe religious sculptures in wood and other media were often brightly painted or colored, as were the interiors of church buildings. These were often destroyed or whitewashed during iconoclast phases of the Protestant Reformation or in other unrest such as the French Revolution, though some have survived in museums such as the V&A, Musée de Cluny, and the Louvre, to name a few. The exteriors of churches were painted as well, but little has survived. Exposure to the elements and changing tastes and religious approval over time acted against their preservation. One of the most extensive remaining examples of painted exteriors is the "Majesty Portal" of the Collegiate Church of Toro, Spain, due to the construction of a chapel which enclosed and protected it from the elements just a century after it was completed.

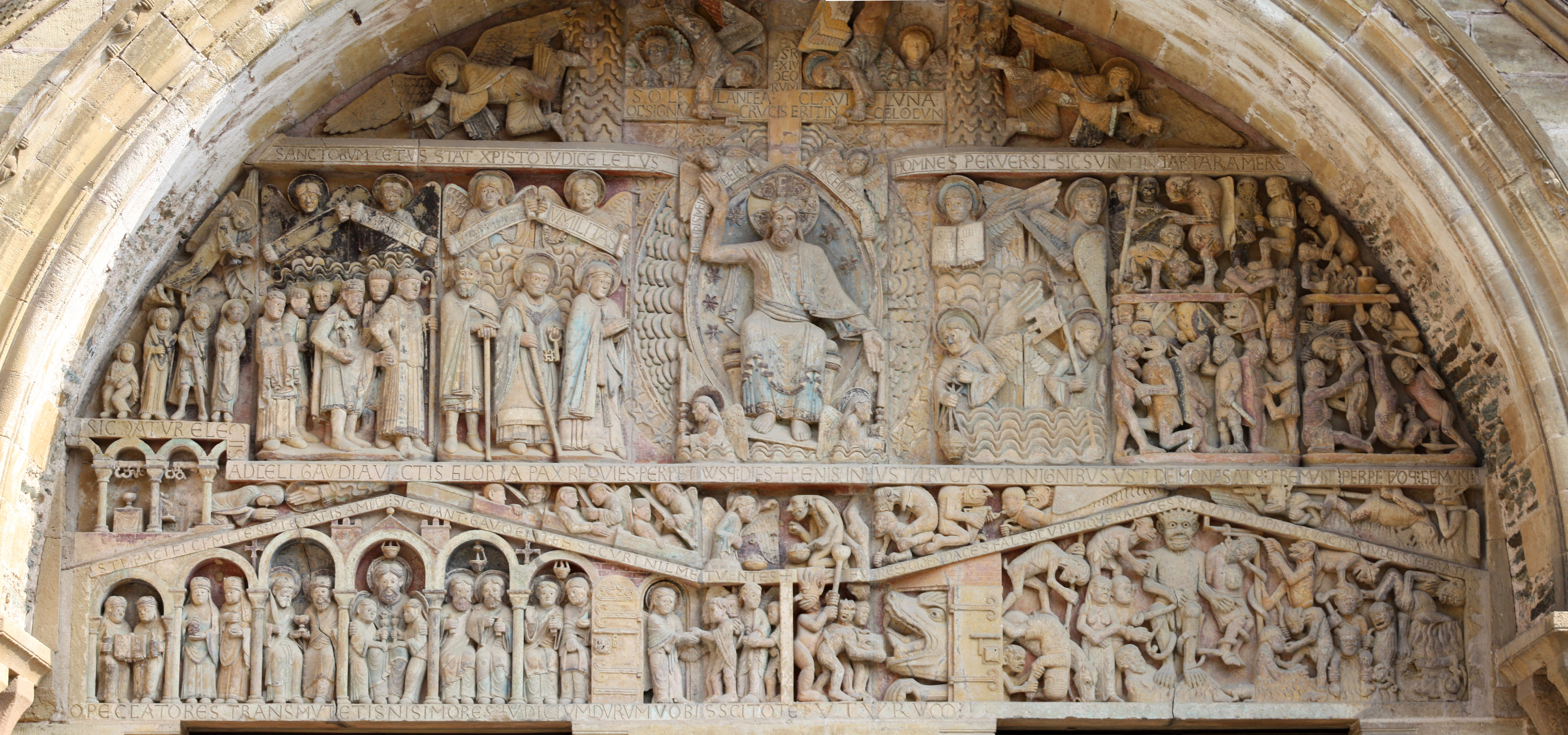
Romanesque – Last Judgement tympanum, Abbey Church of Sainte-Foy, Conques, France, early 12th century

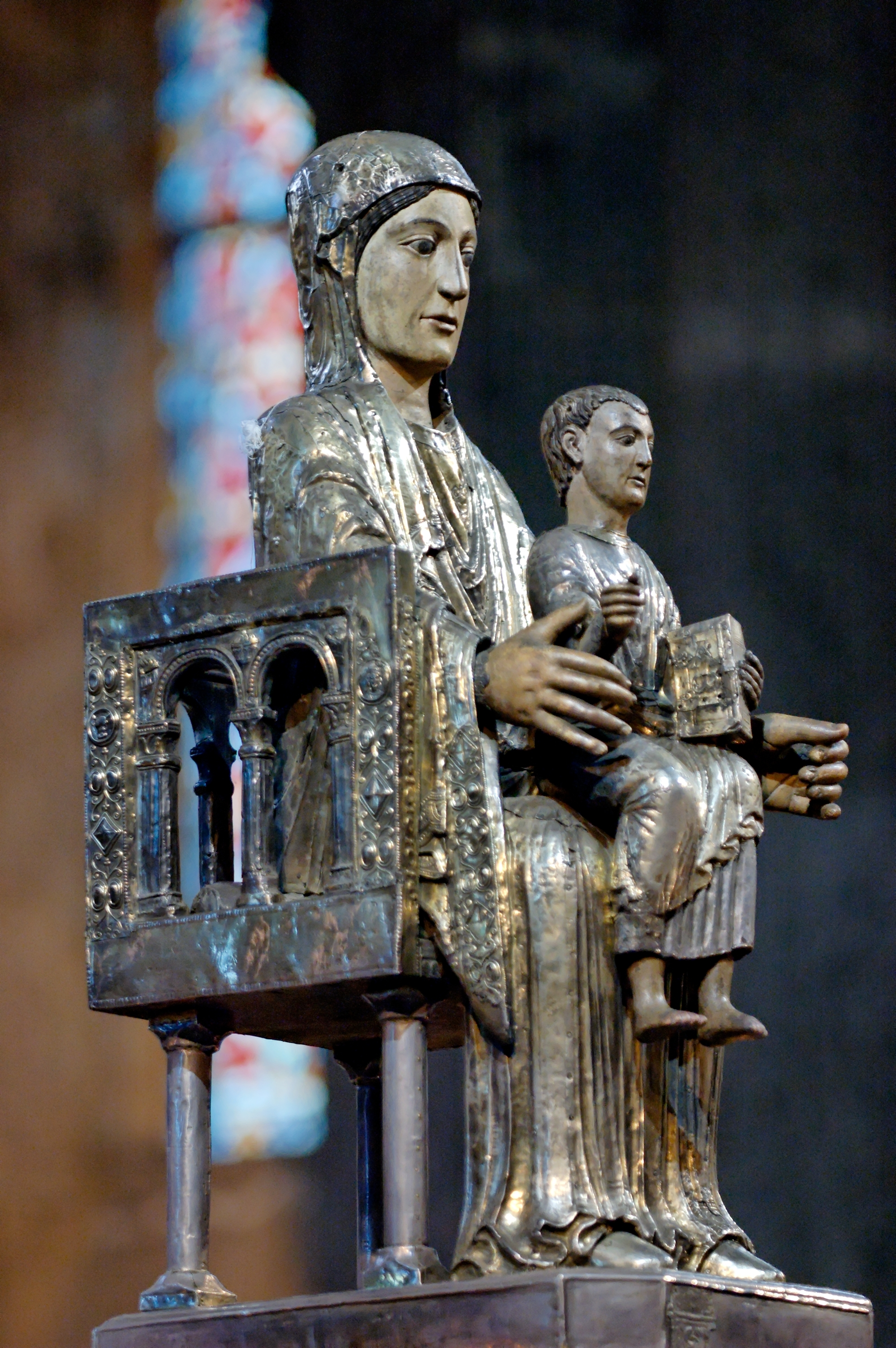
Romanesque – Mary as Seat of Wisdom, 12th century, walnut, silver, silvered copper and polychrome, Basilique Notre-Dame d'Orcival, Orcival, France

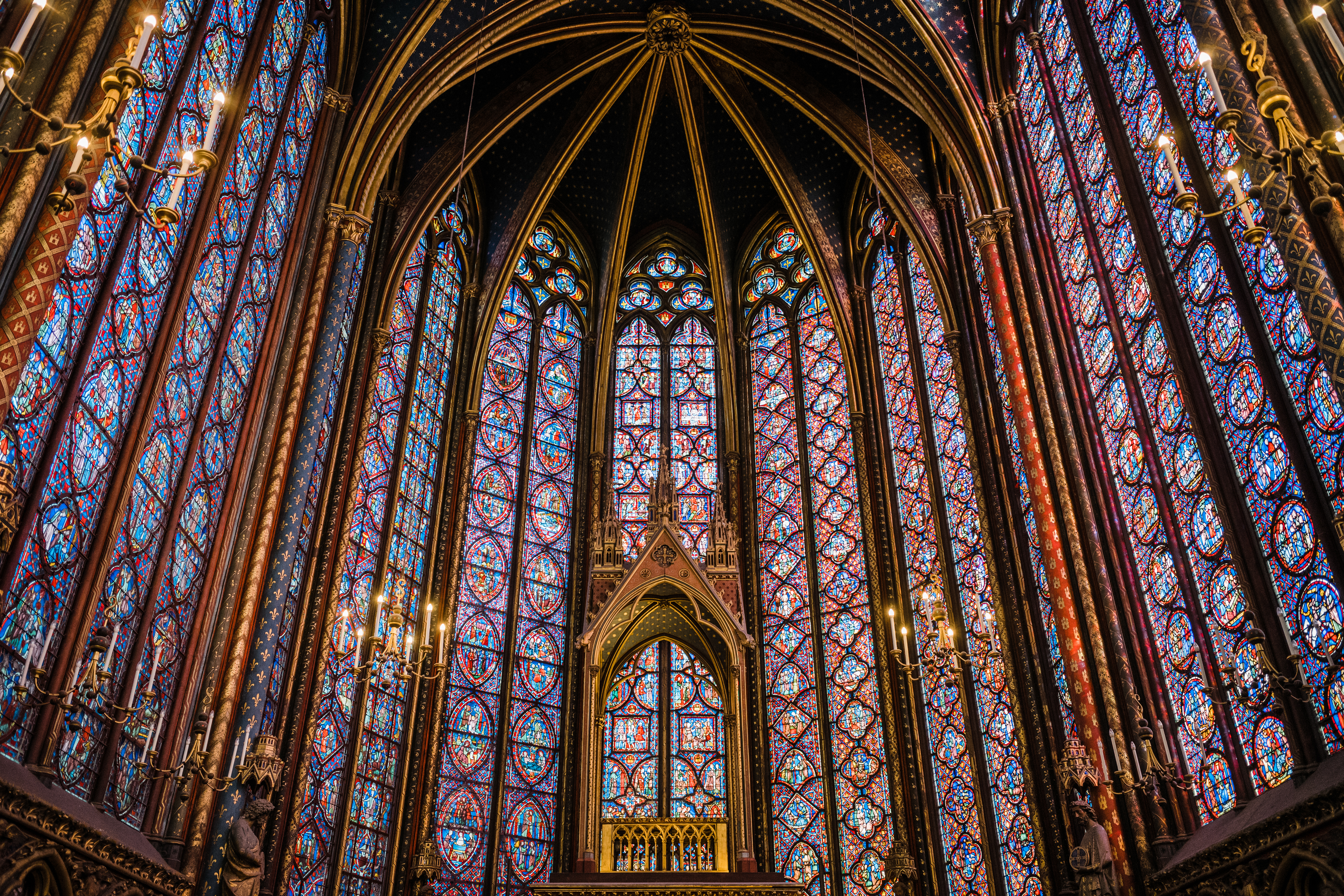
Gothic – Sainte-Chapelle, Paris, by Pierre de Montreuil, 1243–1248

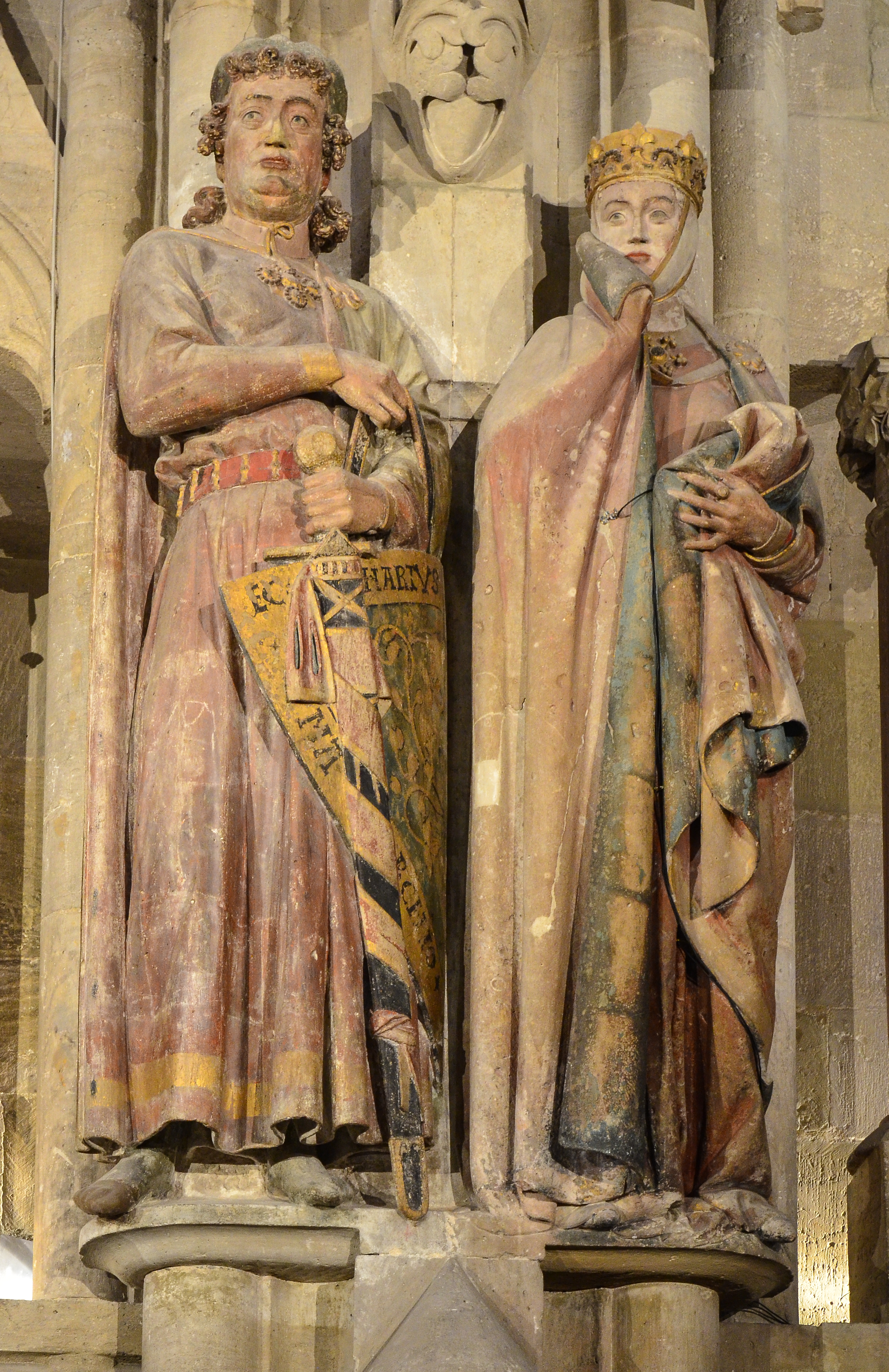
Gothic – Eckard II and Uta, attributed to the Master of Naumburg, 1245–1260, limestone and polychromy, Naumburg Cathedral, Naumburg, Germany

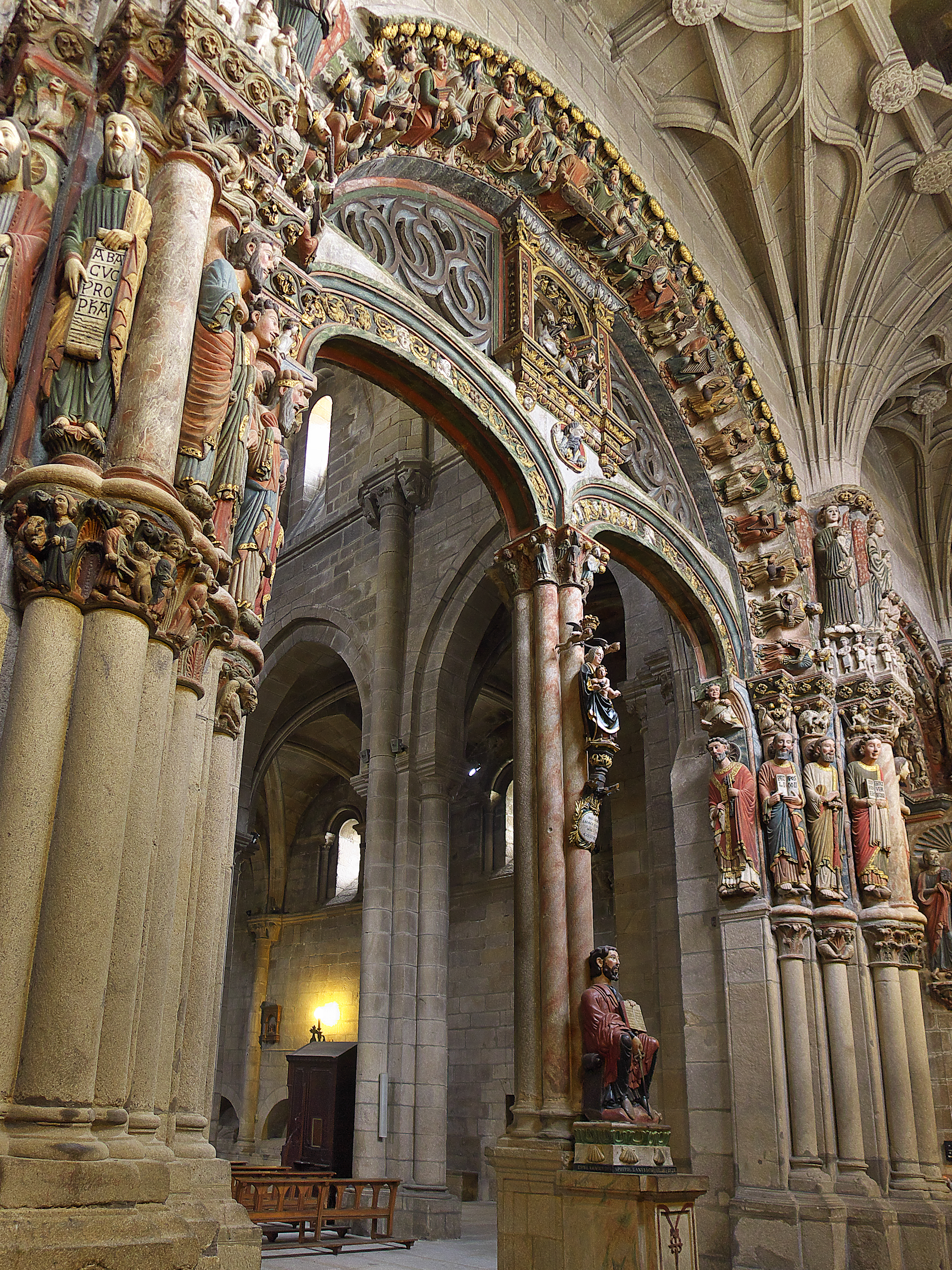
Gothic – Portal of the Ourense Cathedral, Ourense, Spain, unknown architect, first half of the 13th century

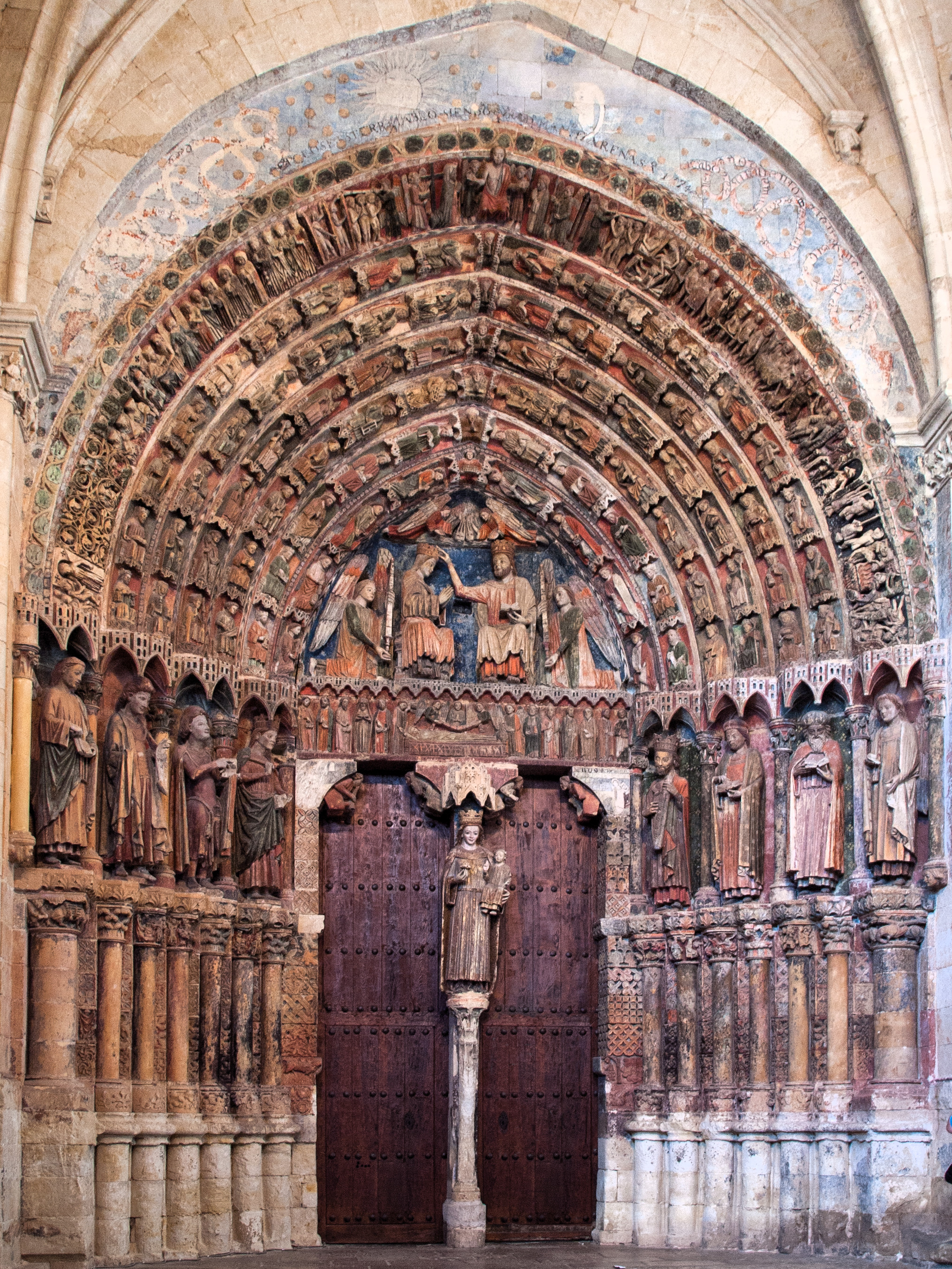
Gothic – Portal of the Collegiate Church of Toro, Spain, unknown architect, 13th century

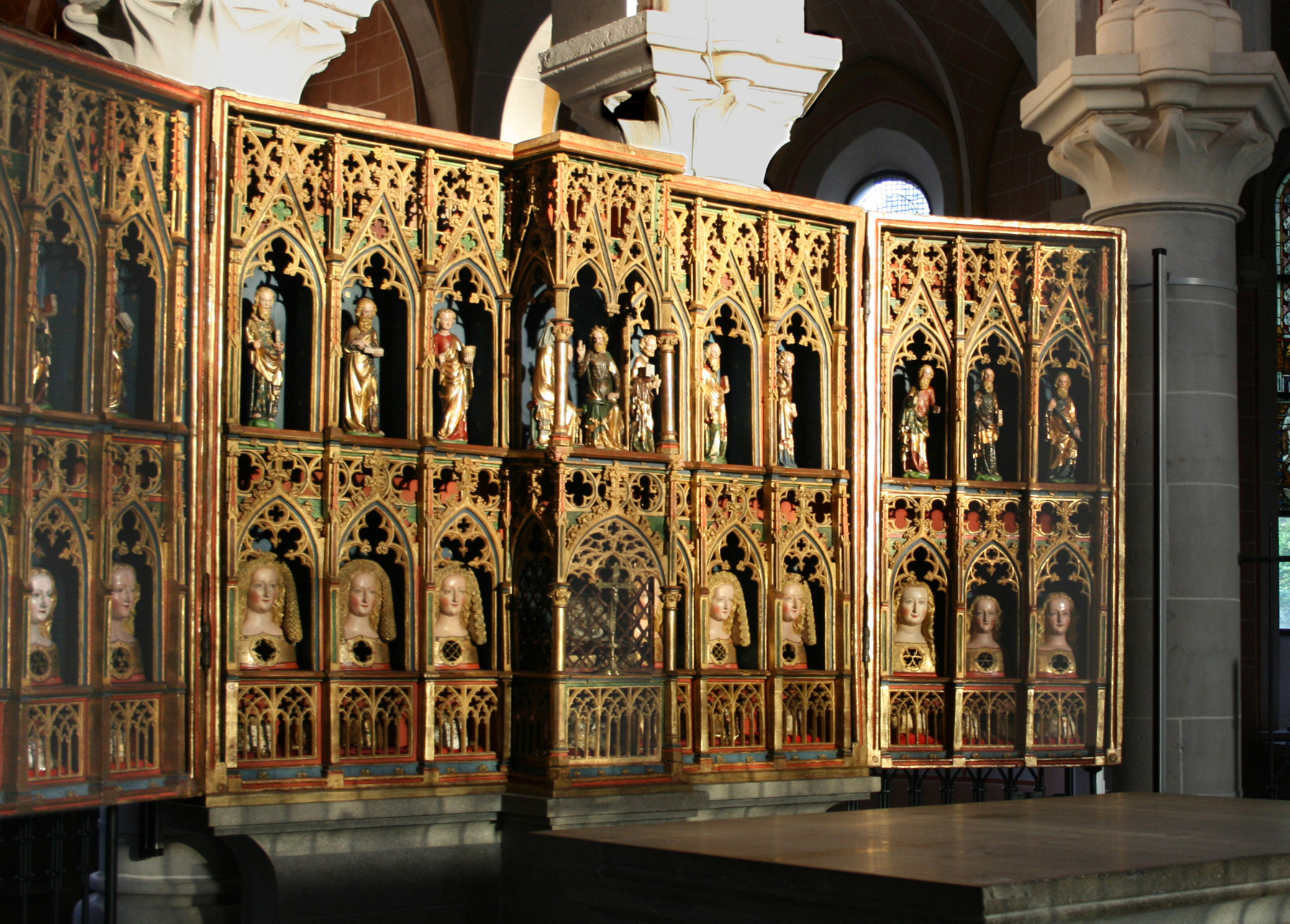
Gothic – Reliquary altarpiece with Saint Ursula, c. 1325, gilded and painted wood, Abteikirche Marienstatt, Streithausen, Germany

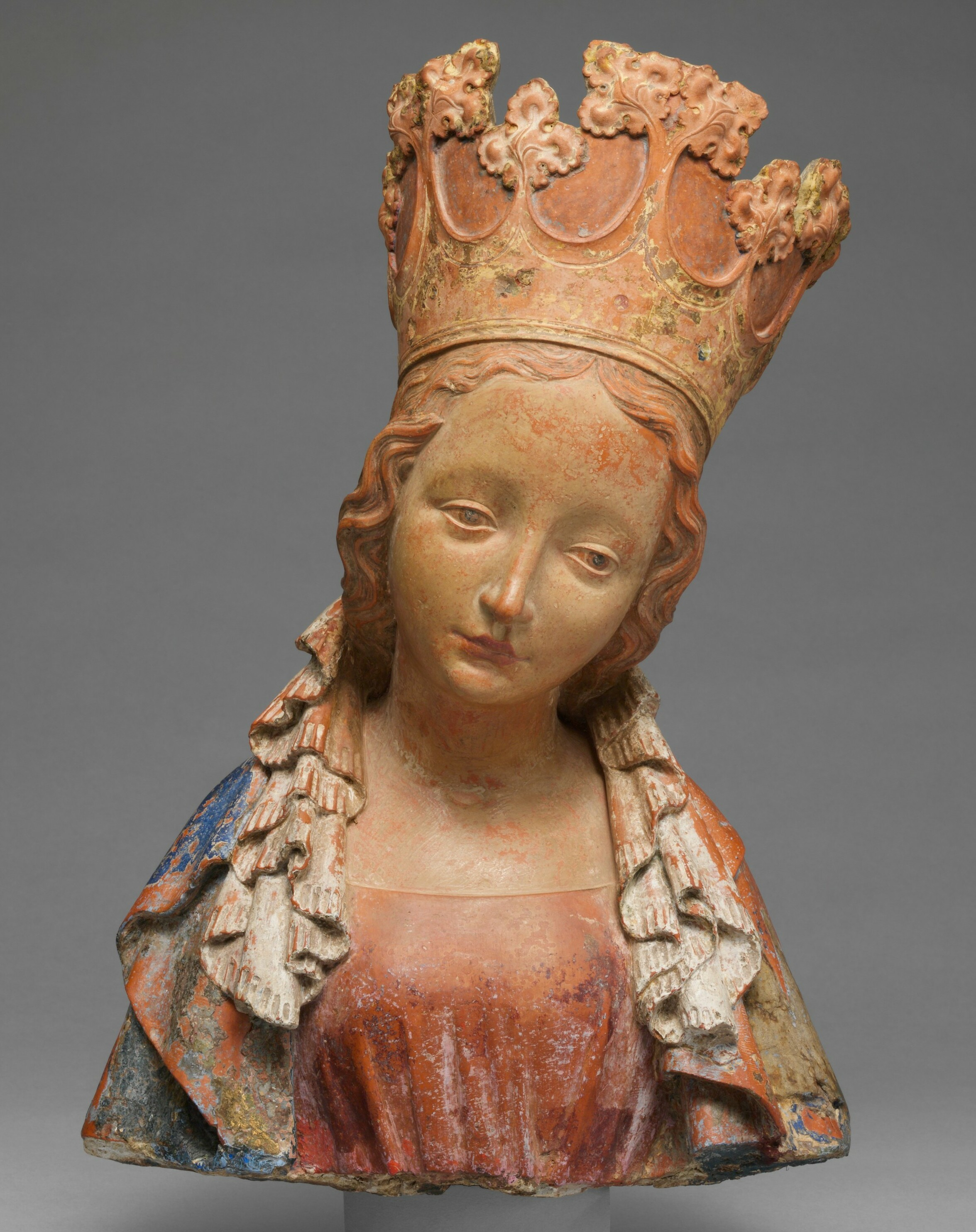
Gothic – Bust of the Virgin, c. 1390–1395, terracotta with paint, Metropolitan Museum of Art, New York City

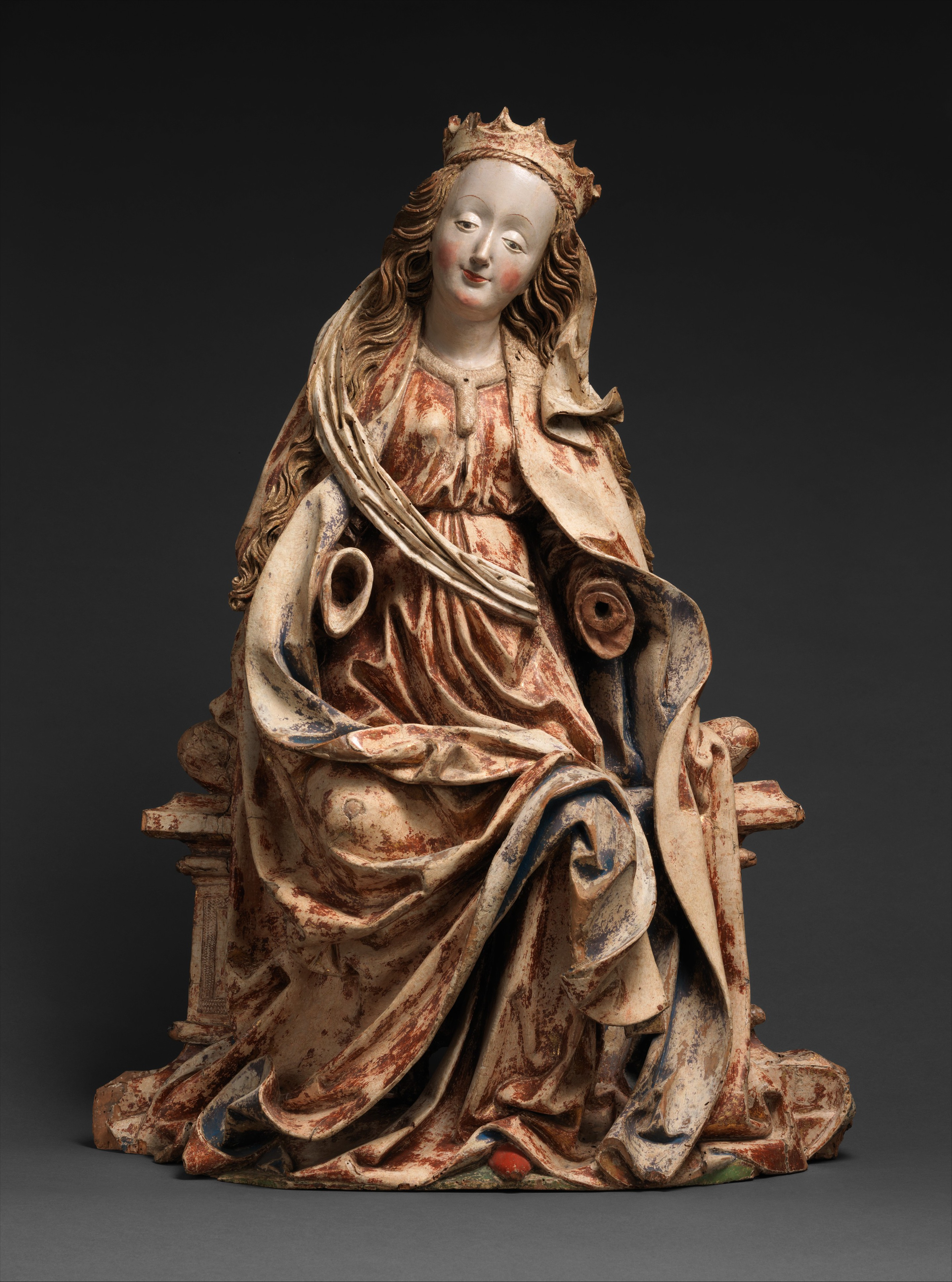
Gothic – Enthroned Virgin, c. 1490 – c. 1500, limewood with gesso, paint and gilding, Metropolitan Museum of Art

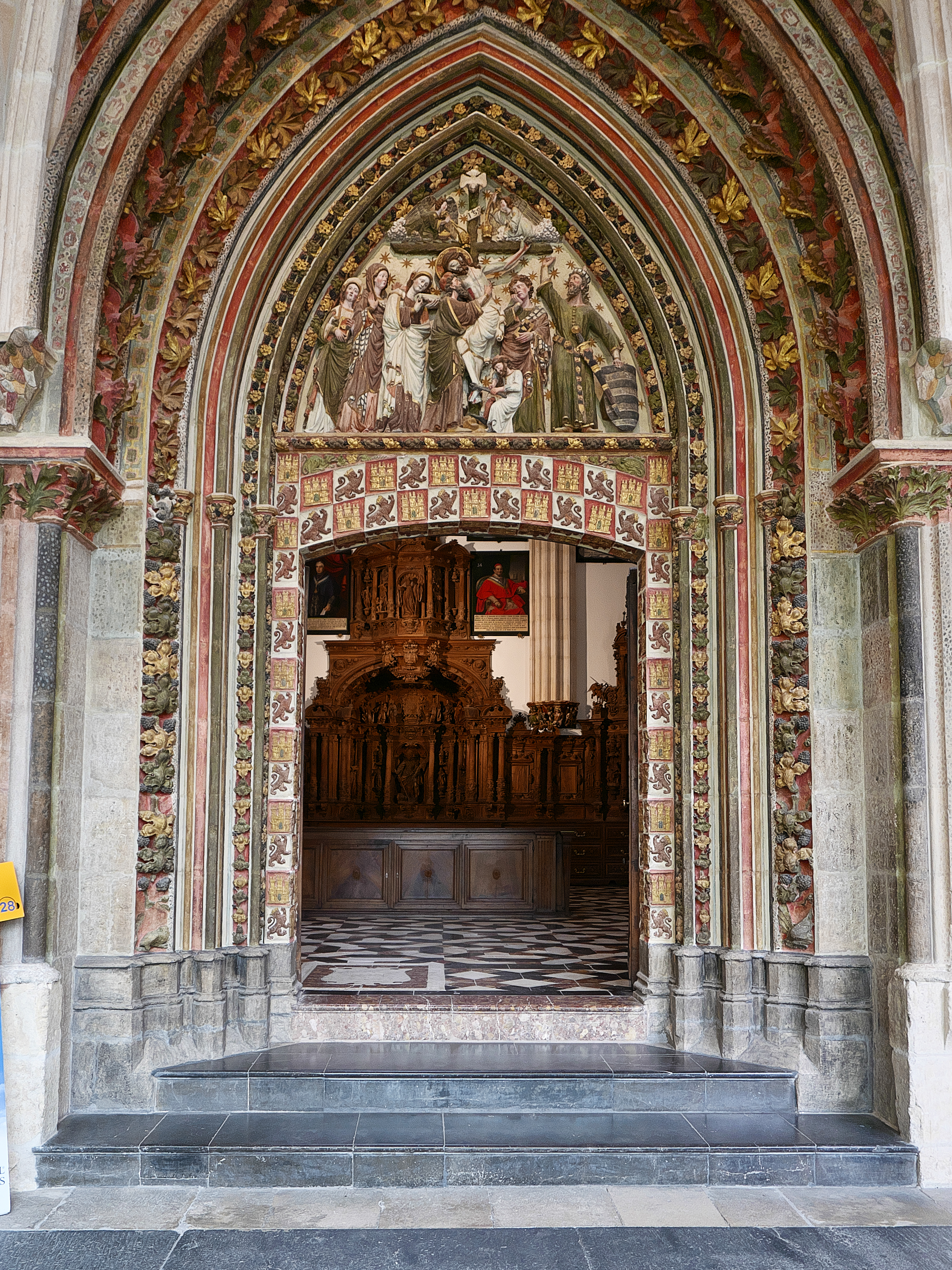
Portal of the Burgos Cathedral, Burgos, Spain, unknown architect, unknown date

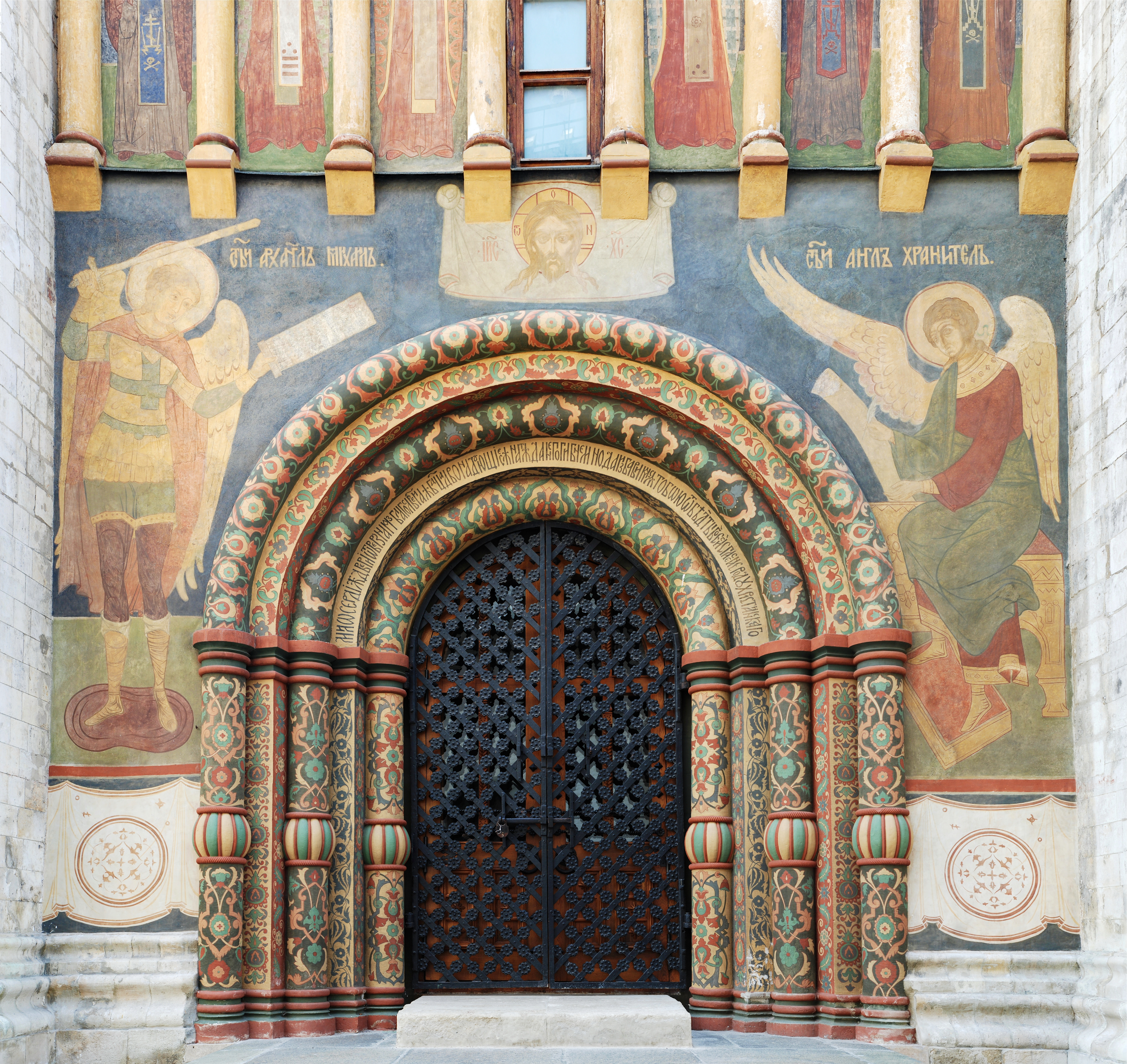
Russian portal of the Dormition Cathedral, Moscow, by Aristotele Fioravanti, 1475–1479

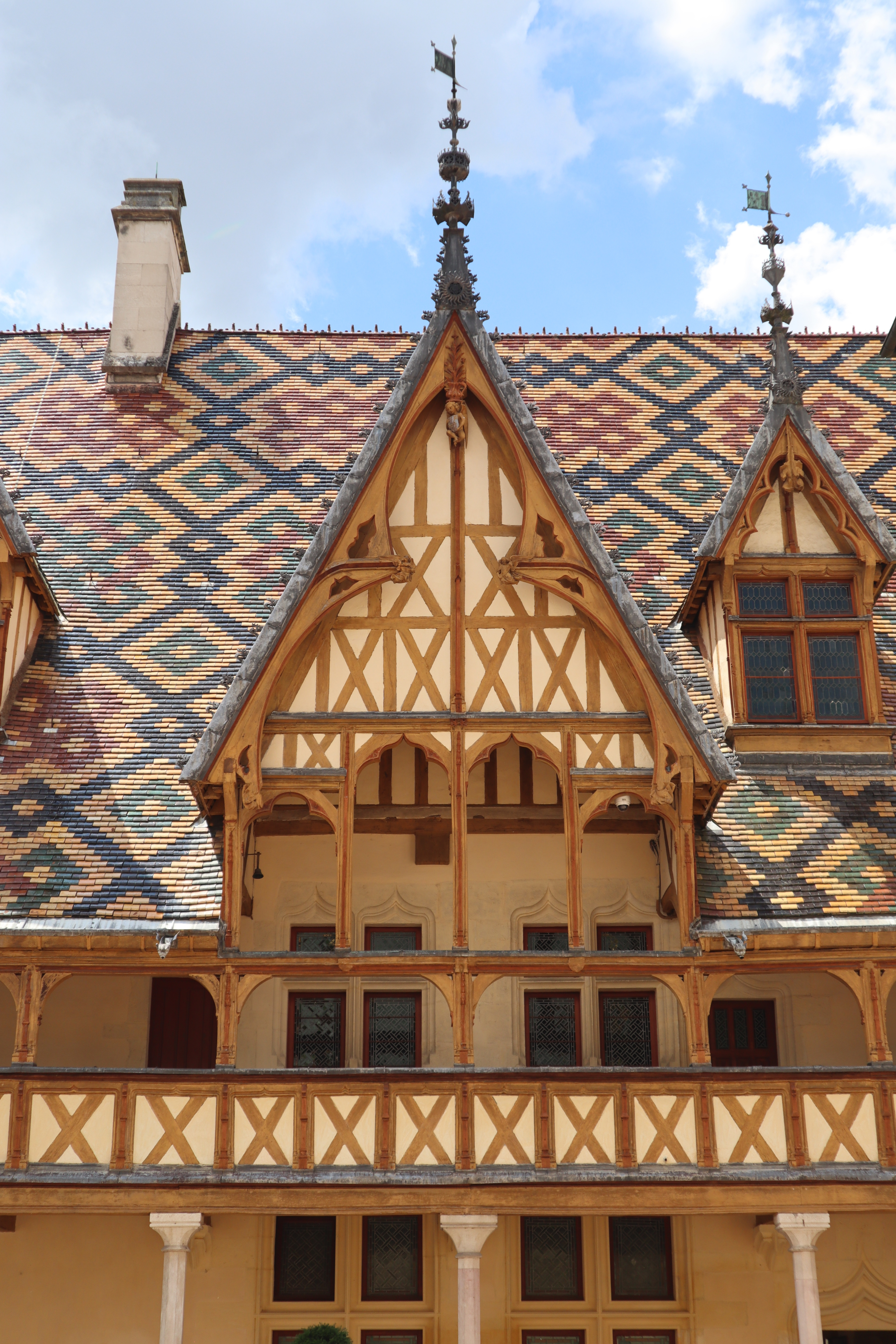
Gothic – Hôtel-Dieu de Beaune, Beaune, France, by Jacques Wiscrère, 1451

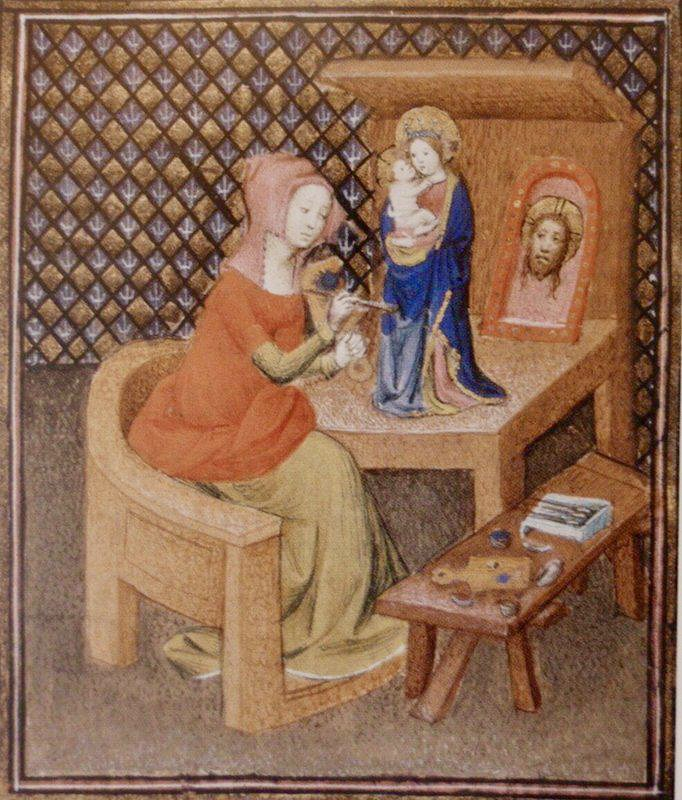
Gothic – Irene, daughter of Cratin, painting a sculpture of the Virgin Mary, France, 1401–1402. Detail from Giovanni Bocaccio's De Claris mulieribus (Concerning famous women), 1403 edition, Bibliothèque nationale de France, Paris

== Pre-Columbian ==
Pre-Columbian art is generally referred to as the visual arts of indigenous peoples of the Caribbean, North, Central, and South Americas from before the onset of European colonization. The most common forms of their art that survive today are pottery, sculptures, metalworks, and paintings, most of which have preserved polychrome. An example of polychrome sculpture can be found in one of the prehistoric Olmec colossal heads from San Lorenzo Tenochtitlán, which bears traces of plaster and red paint.

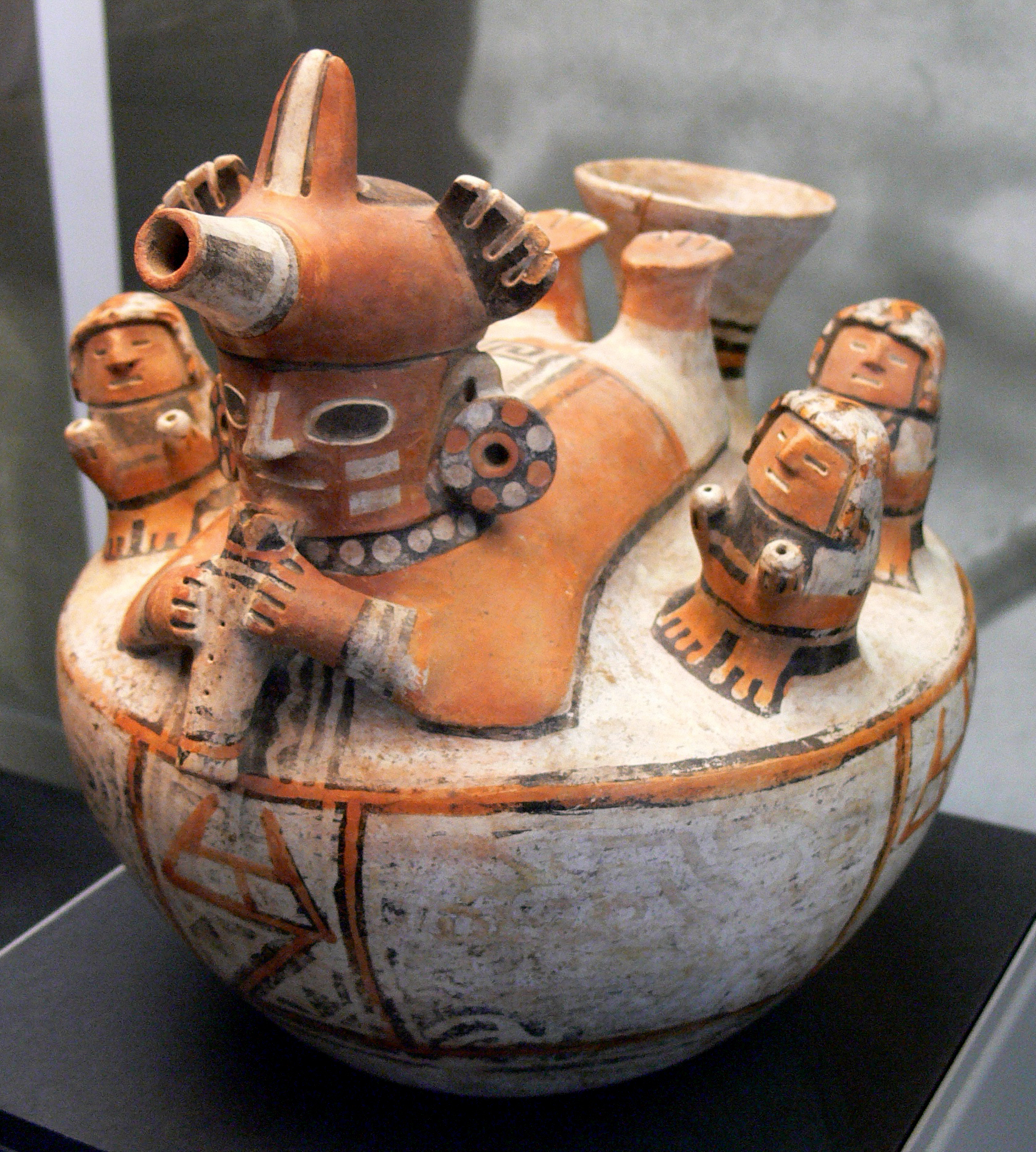
Recuay culture vase with music scene, 300 BCE-300 CE, painted clay, height: 21.5 cm, Kloster Allerheiligen

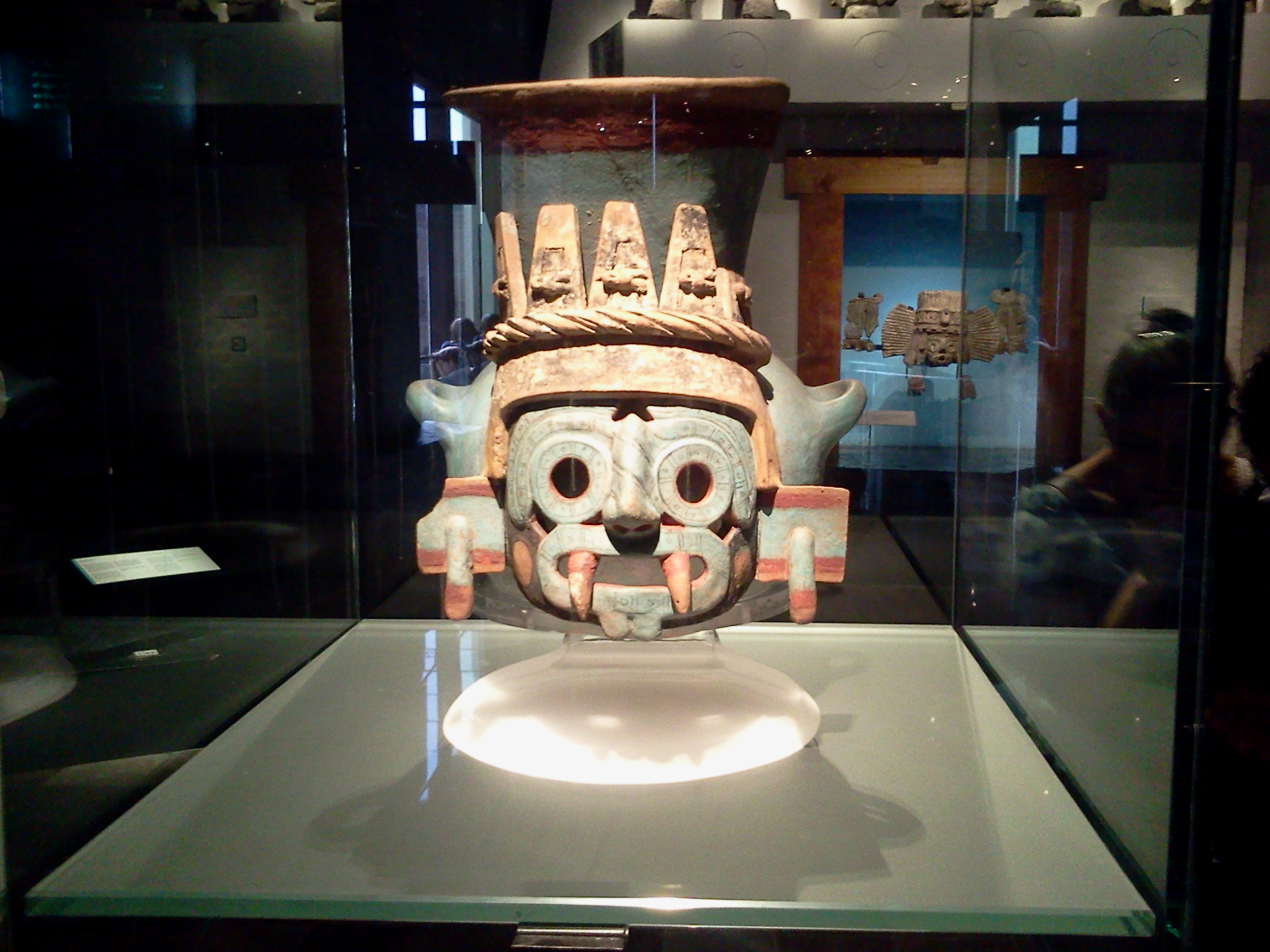
Aztec Tláloc effigy vessel, 1440–1469, painted earthenware, height: 35 cm (1^{3}/_{4} in.), Museo del Templo Mayor

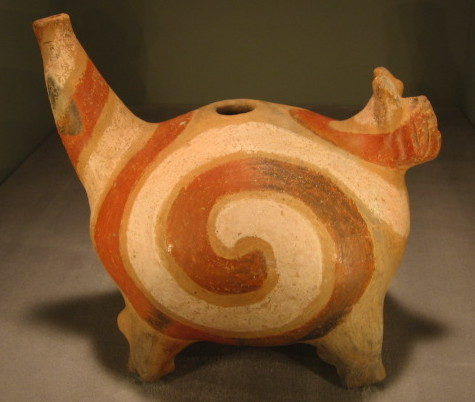
Mississippian culture painted ceramic jug depicting the underwater panther, found at Rose Mound in Cross County, Arkansas, c. 1400-1600 CE

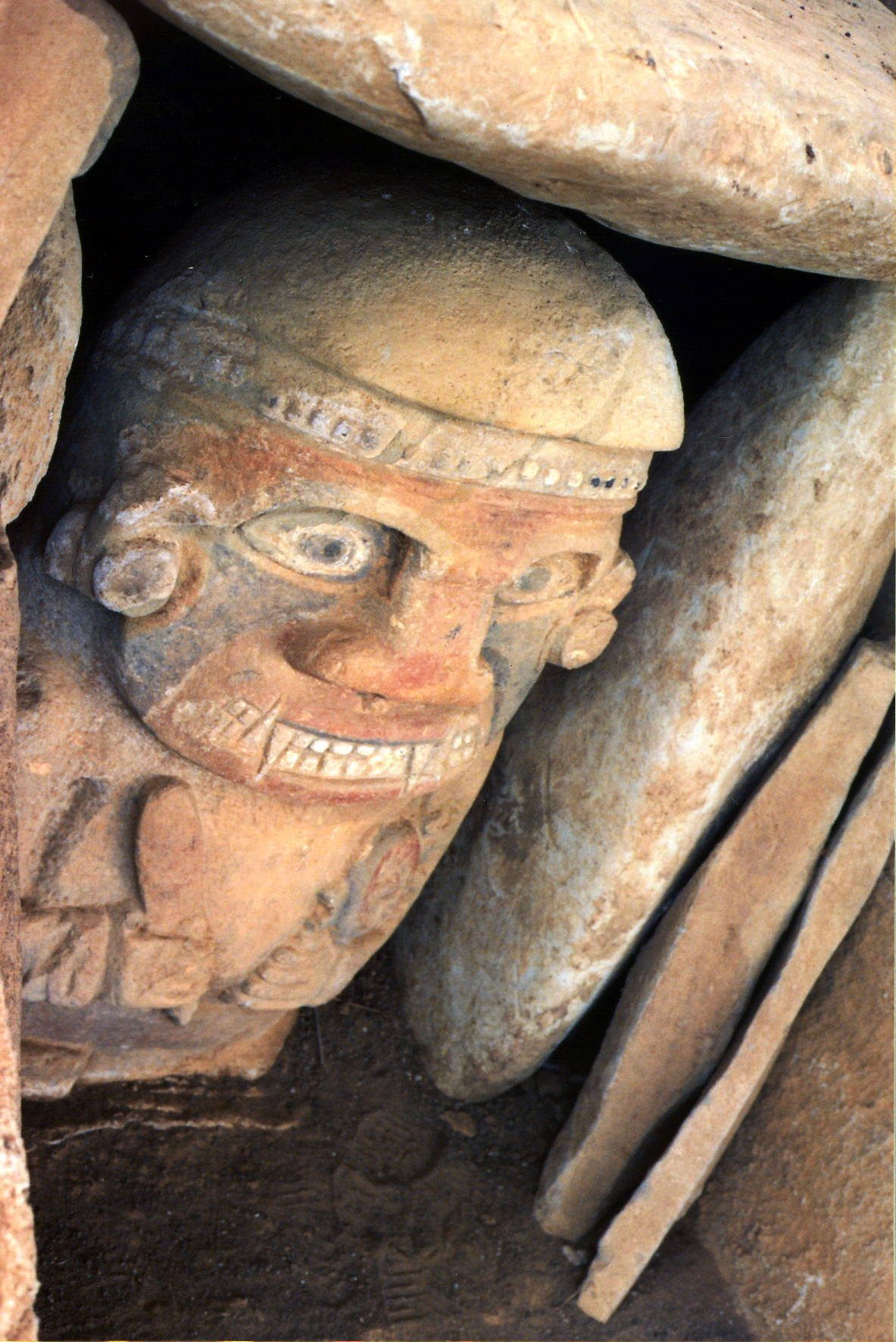
Painted sculpture from a tomb of the San Agustín culture

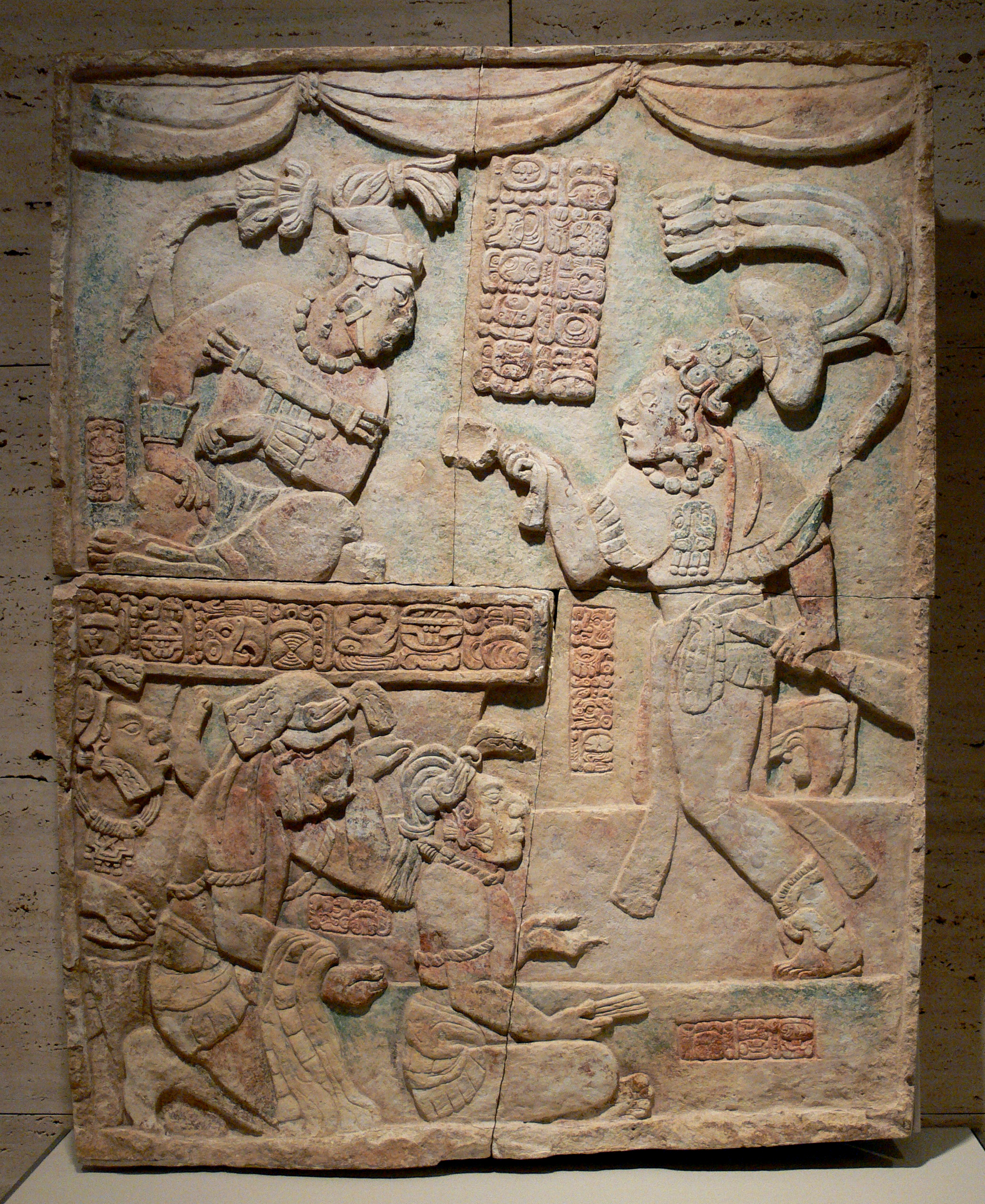
Mayan Relief depicting Aj Chak Maax presenting captives before ruler Itzamnaaj Bahlam III of Yaxchilan, with the scene dated to August 23 783, artwork dated to 785, painted limestone

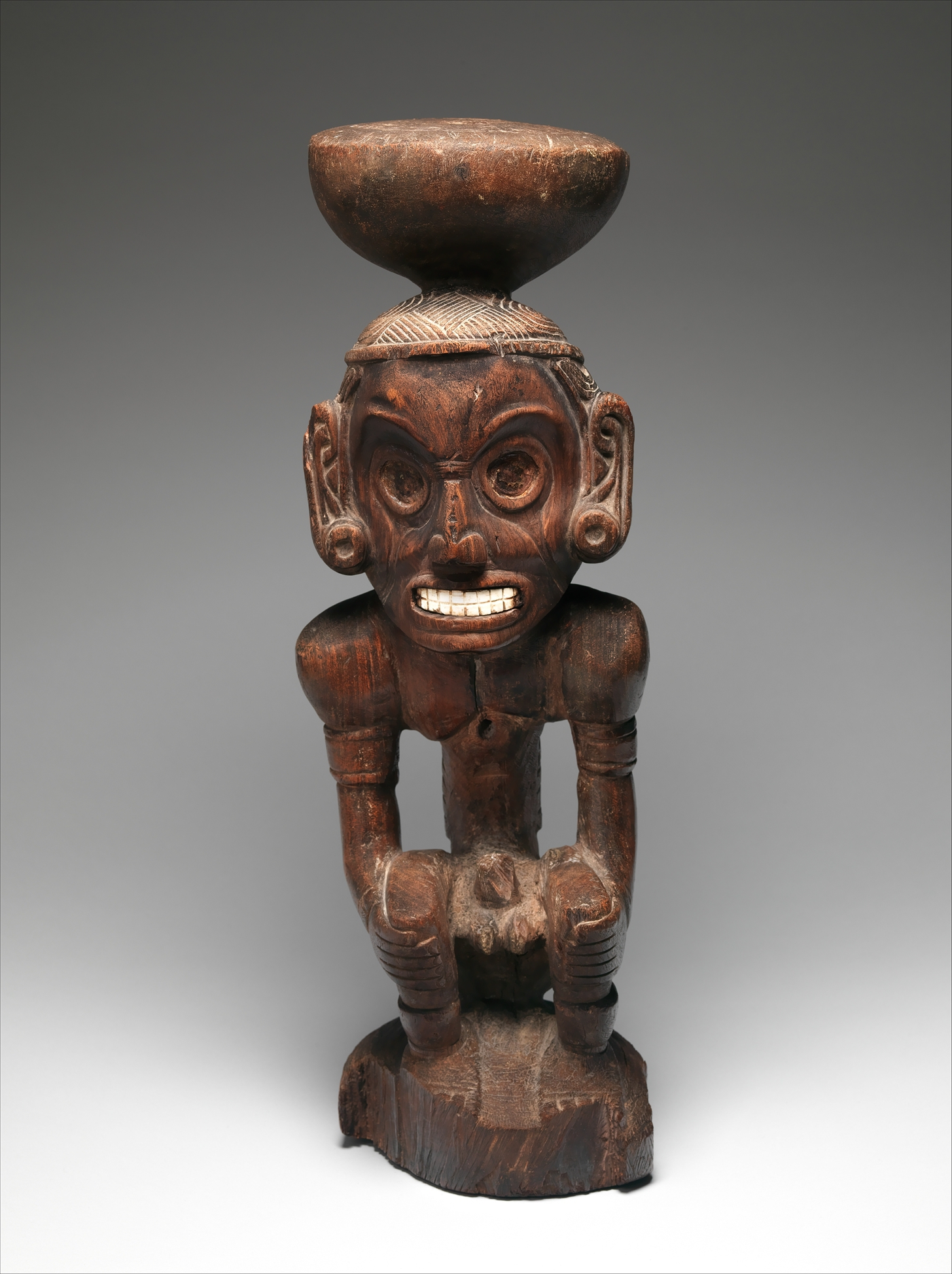
Zemi figure, 15th-16th century, ironwood with shell inlay, 27 in. (68.5 cm) high, Dominican Republic, MET

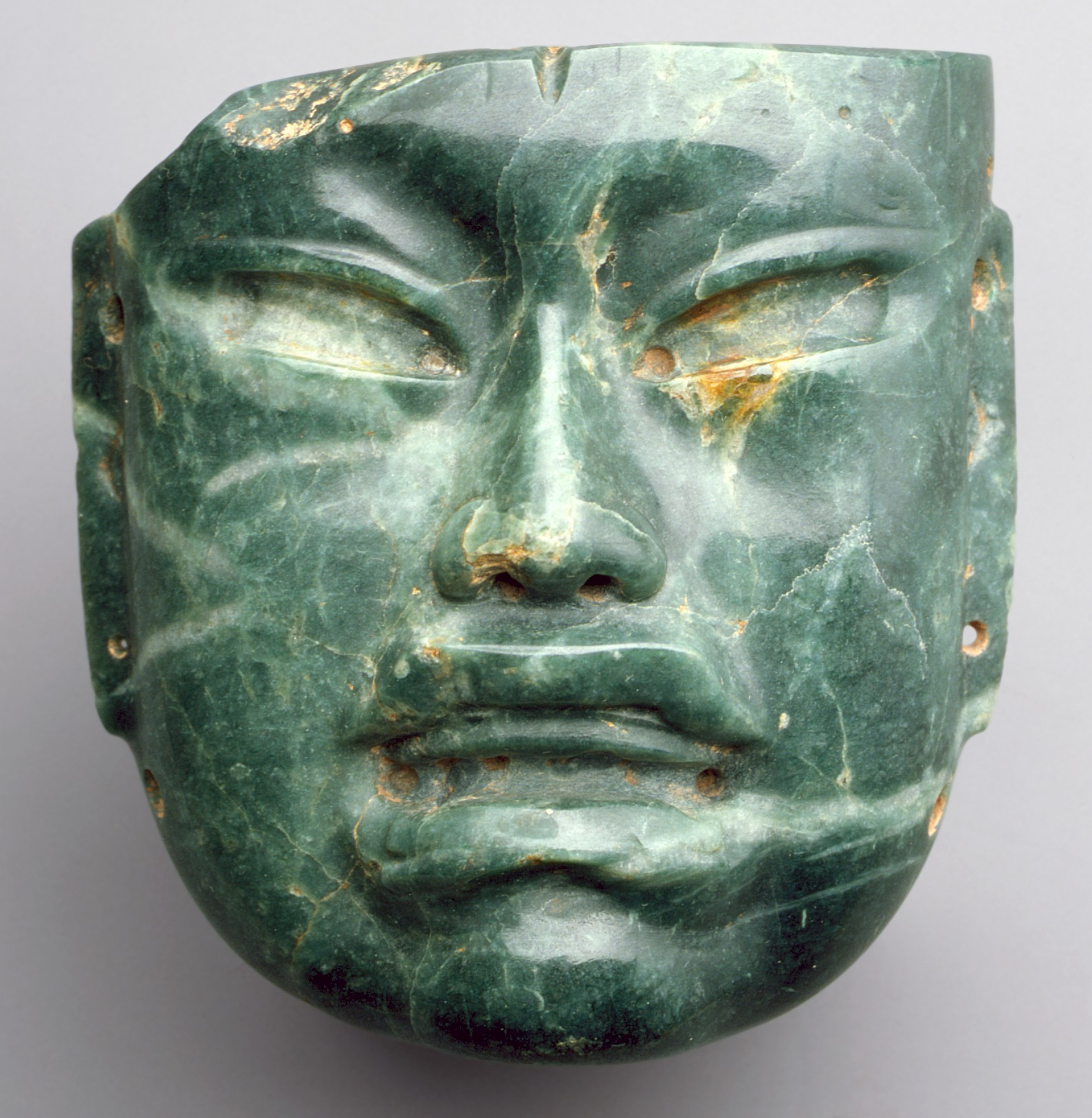
Olmec jade mask, 10th–6th century BCE, jadeite, height: 17.1 cm (6^{3}/_{4} in.), width: 16.5 (6^{5}/_{16} in.), MET

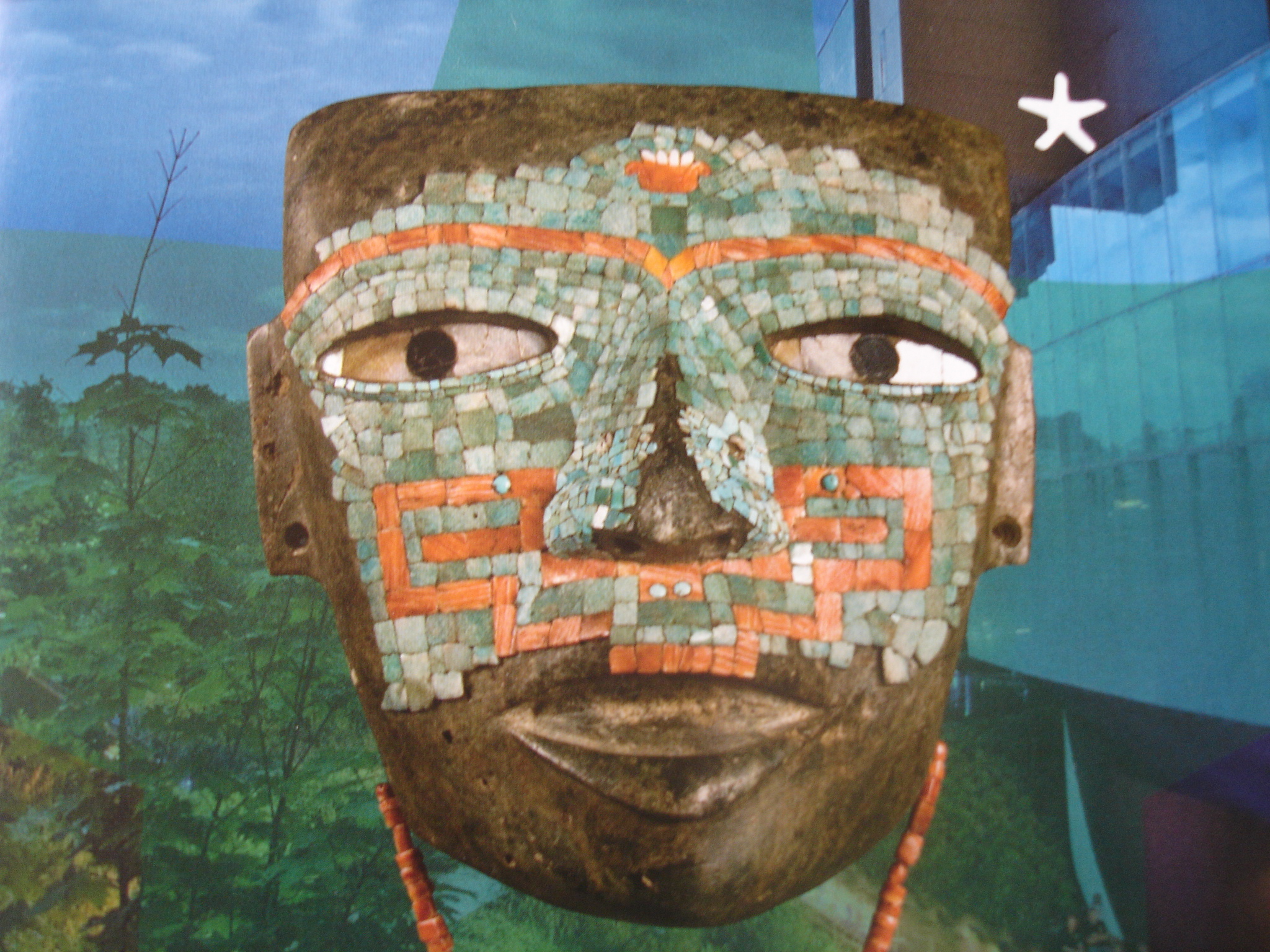
Teotihuacan mask with a necklace with 55 beads and pendant, serpentine inlaid with amazonite, turquoise, shell, coral and obsidian, National Museum of Anthropology

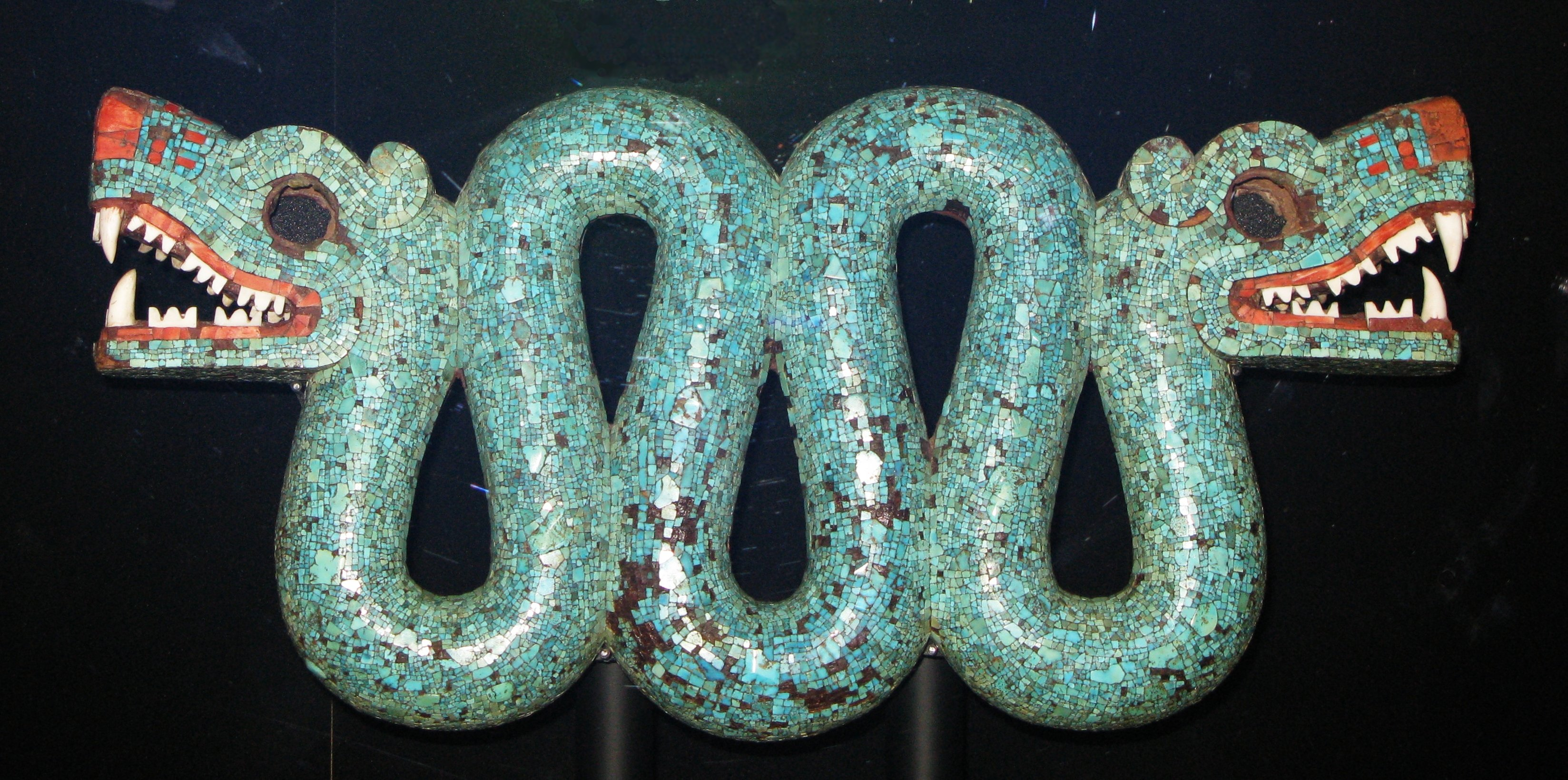
The Aztec double-headed serpent, 1450–1521, Spanish cedar wood (Cedrela odorata), turquoise, shell, traces of gilding & 2 resins are used as adhesive (pine resin and Bursera resin), height: 20.3 cm (8.0 in), width: 43.3 cm (17.0 in), depth: 5.9 cm (2.3 in), British Museum

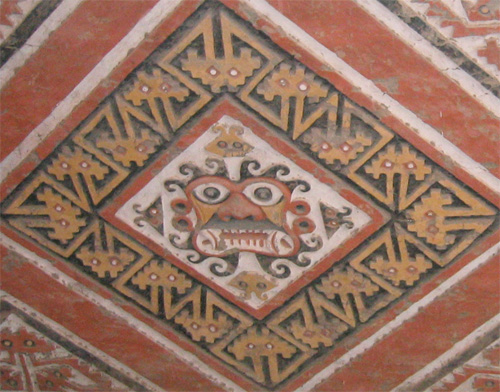
Moche culture mural of a "decapitator," from the Huaca de la Luna site, Peru, 100–700 AD

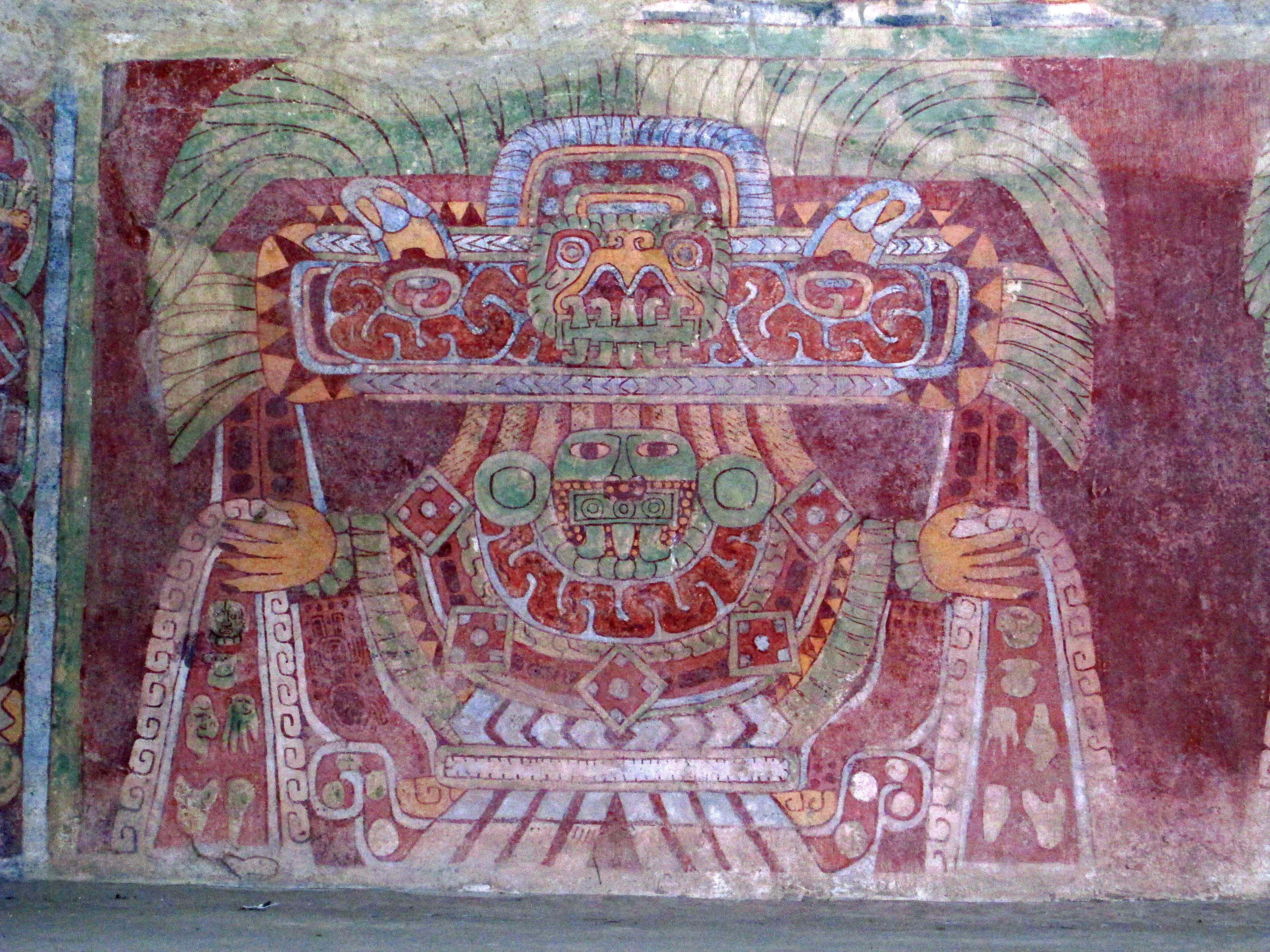
Teotihuacan mural from the Tetitla apartment compound, depicting what has been identified as the Great Goddess of Teotihuacan, mid-1st millennium AD

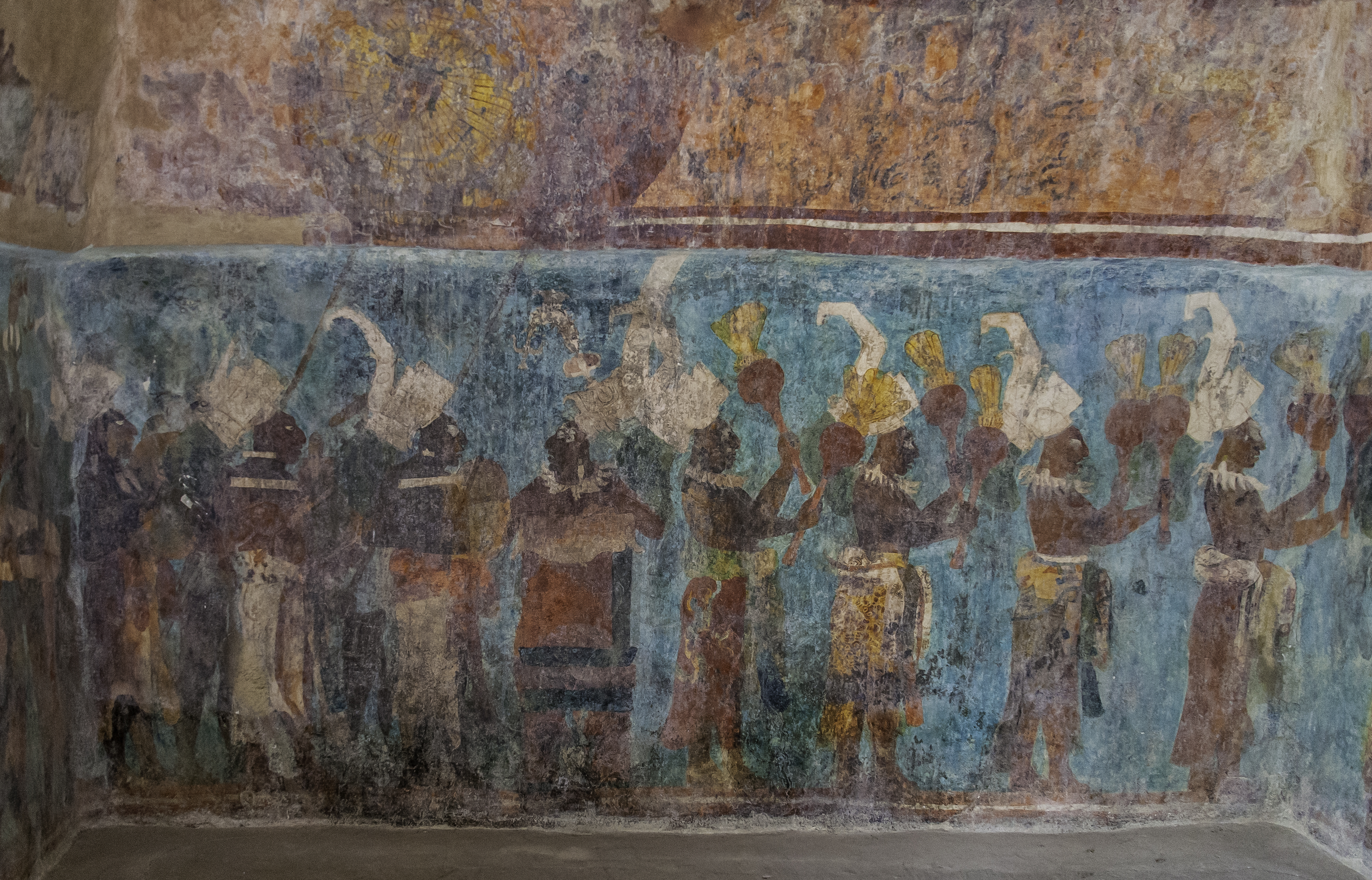
Mayan mural of Bonampak from Structure 1 of the Temple of the Murals, depicting a procession of musicians, end of the eighth century AD

== 17th and 18th centuries ==
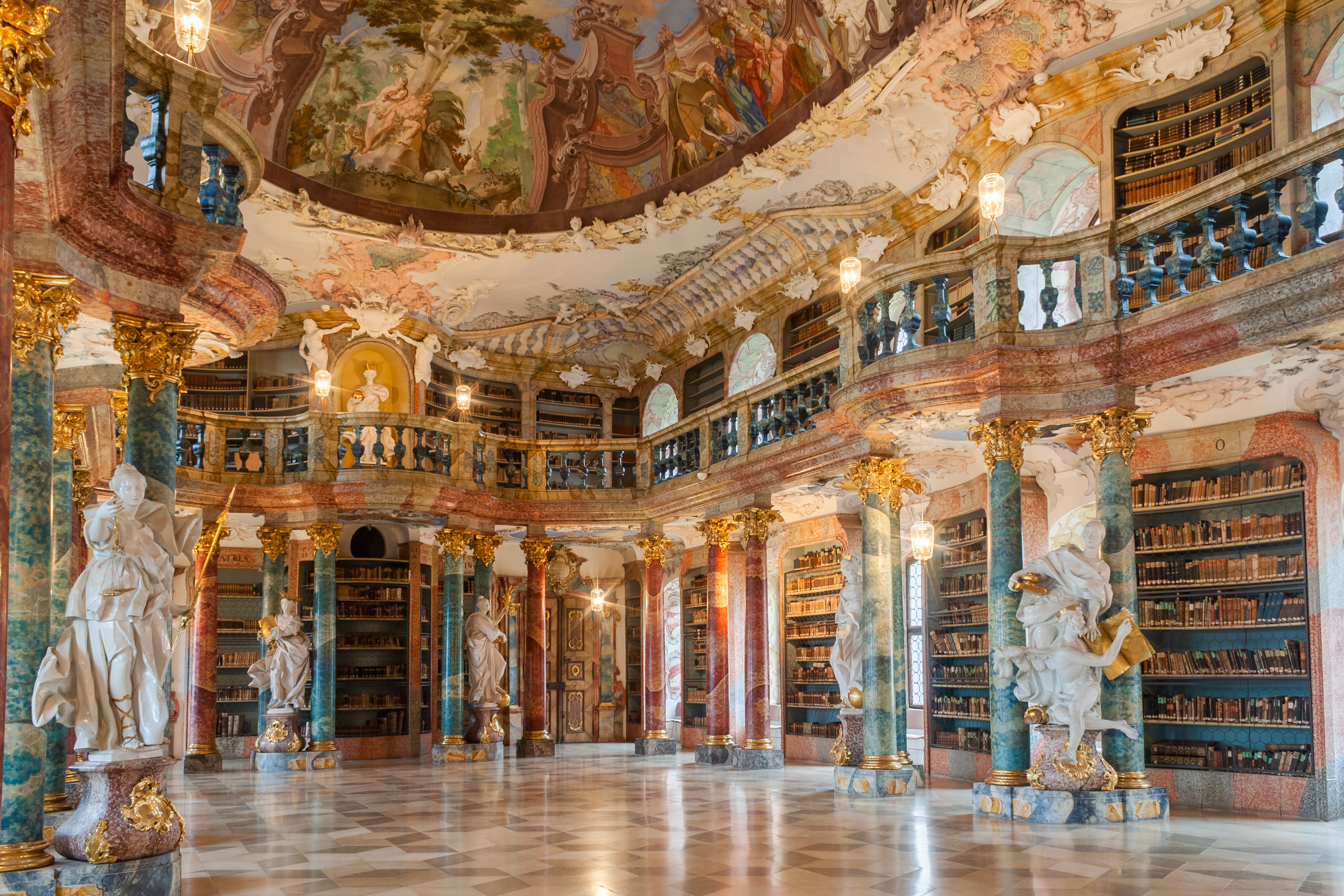
Library of the Wiblingen Abbey, Ulm, Germany, by Christian Wiedemann, 1737–1744. All the elements that seem to be made out of marble are actually made from polychrome stucco.

While stone and metal sculpture normally remained uncolored, like the classical survivals, polychromed wood sculptures were produced by Spanish artists: Juan Martínez Montañés, Gregorio Fernández (17th century); German: Ignaz Günther, Philipp Jakob Straub (18th century); or Brazilian: Aleijadinho (19th century).

Monochromatic color solutions of architectural orders were also designed in the late, dynamic Baroque, drawing on the ideas of Borromini and Guarini. Single-colored stone cladding was used: light sandstone, as in the case of the façade of the Bamberg Jesuit church (Gunzelmann 2016) designed by Georg and Leonhard Dientzenhofer (1686–1693), the façade of the monastery church in Michelsberg by Leonard Dientzenhofer (1696), and the abbey church in Neresheim by J.B. Neumann (1747–1792).

In the space of present-day Germany, during the 18th century, the Asam brothers (Egid Quirin Asam and Cosmas Damian Asam) designed churches with undulating walls, curved broken pediments and polychromy. In the German-speaking space, multiple Rococo churches and libraries with pastel polychrome stuccos and columns were built. There, faux marble columns are made from wood pillars that are covered in a layer of polychrome stucco, a mixture of plaster, lime, and pigment. When these ingredients are mixed, a homogenous-coloured paste is created. To achieve the marble look, thinner batches of darker and lighter paste are made, so that veins begin to appear. It is all roughly mixed by hand. When the material hardens it is polished by rubbing with fine sandpaper, and thus this layer of polychrome stucco becomes glossy and imitates really realistically marble. A good example of this is the Library of the Wiblingen Abbey in Ulm, Germany. Faux marble made of stucco will continue to be used during the 19th and early 20th centuries too. It is used only for interiors, because stucco dissolves outside through of contact with water.

In Wallachia, during the late 17th and early 18th centuries, the Brâncovenesc style was popular in architecture and decorative arts. It is named after Prince Constantin Brâncoveanu, during whose reign it was developed. Some of the churches in this style have polychrome facades, decorated with murals, like the church of the Stavropoleos Monastery in Bucharest, Romania.

The 2nd half of the 18th century was the rise of Neoclassicism, a movement which tries its best at reviving the styles of Ancient Greece, Rome, the Etruscan civilization, and sometimes even Egypt. During Louis XVI's reign (1760–1789), interiors in the Louis XVI style start to be decorated with arabesques, inspired by those discovered in ancient houses in Pompeii and Herculaneum. They are painted in pastel colours, painted white with the ornate parts gilt, or polychrome. The State Dining Room of the Inveraray Castle in Scotland, decorated by two French painters, is a good example of a polychrome Louis XVI style interior.

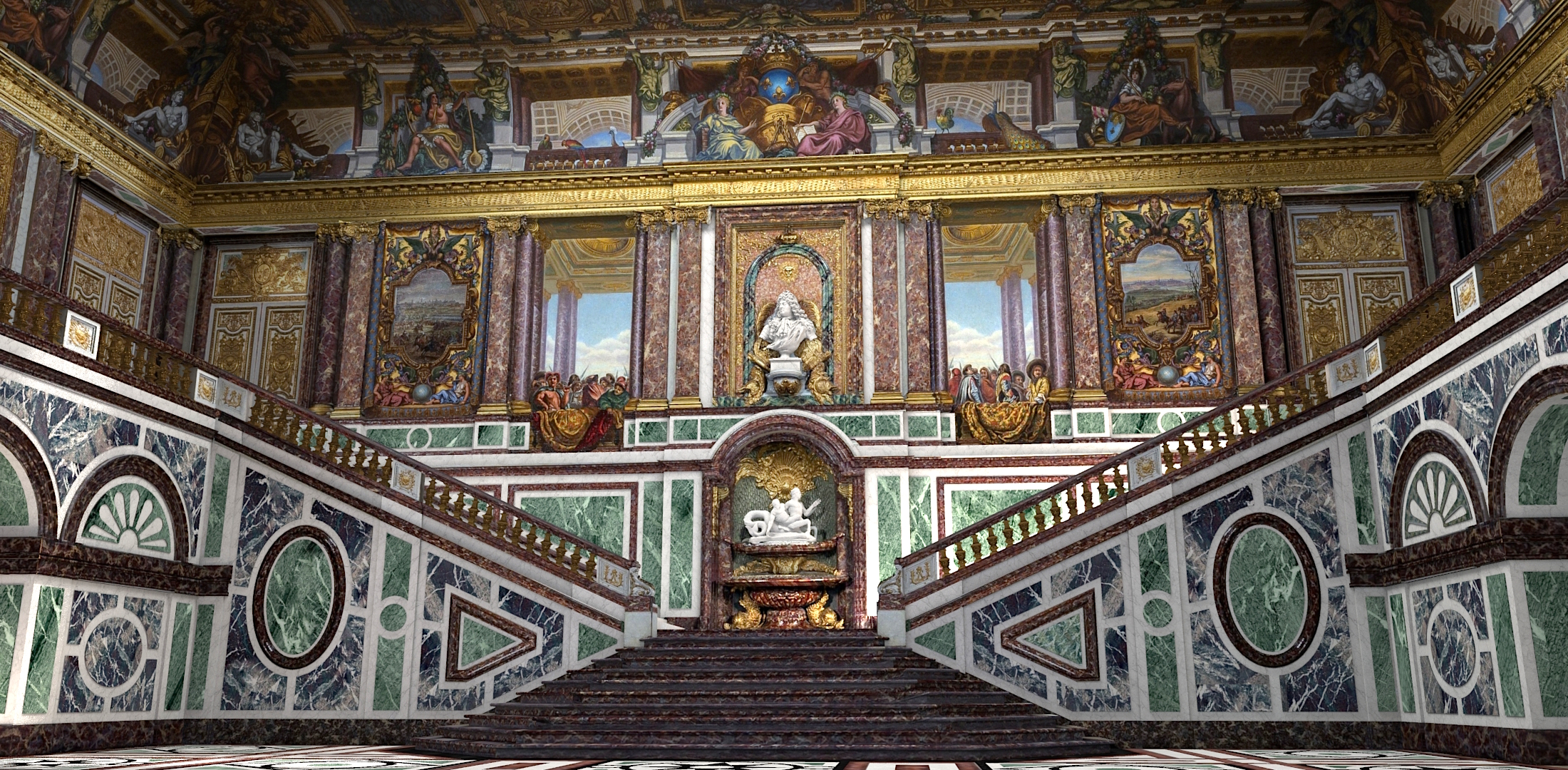
Baroque – Escalier des Ambassadeurs of the Palace of Versailles, Versailles, France, by François d'Orbay and Charles Le Brun, 1674–1679, demolished in 1752 under Louis XV

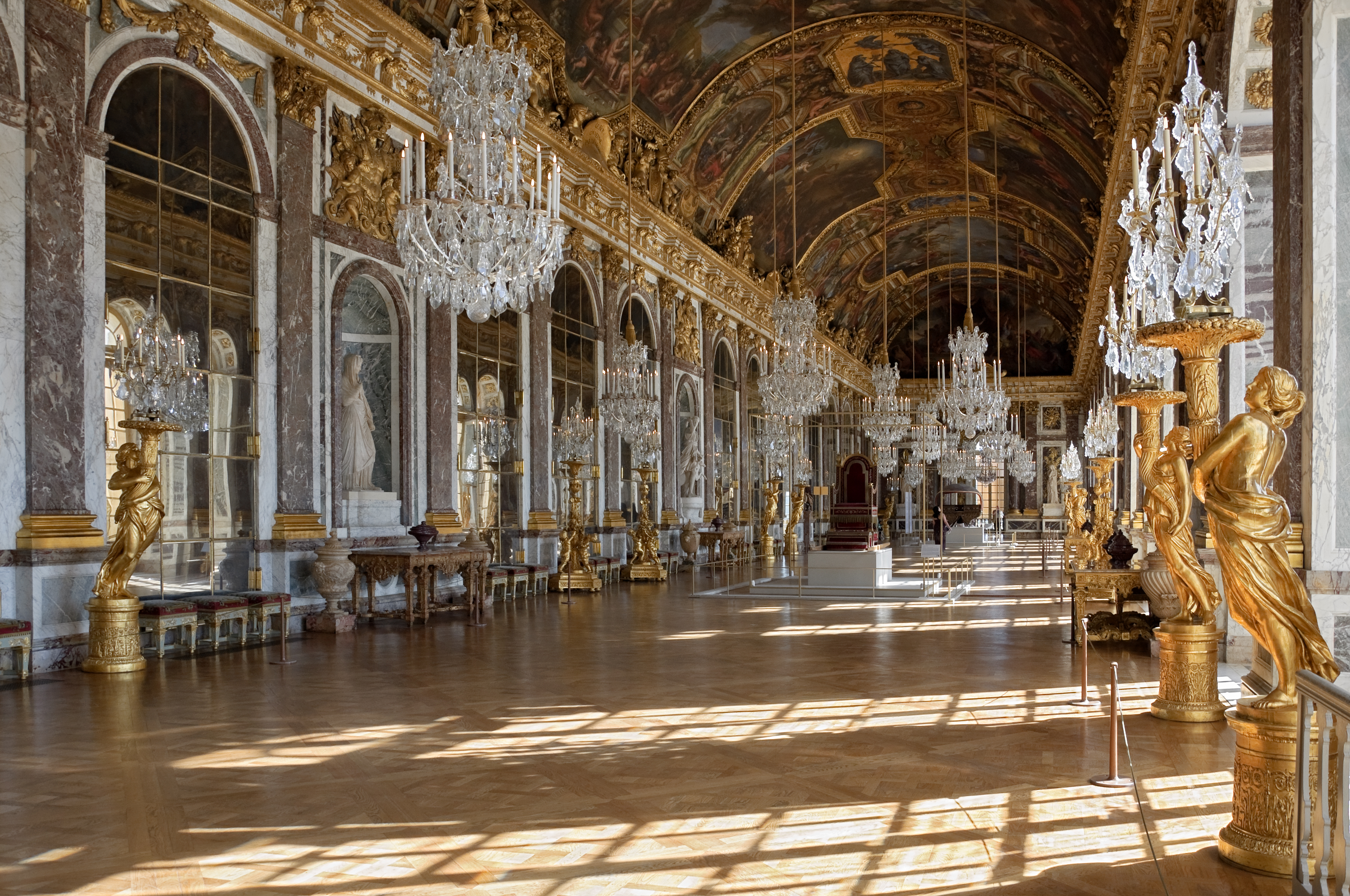
Baroque – Hall of Mirrors of the Palace of Versailles, by Jules Hardouin-Mansart, 1678–1684

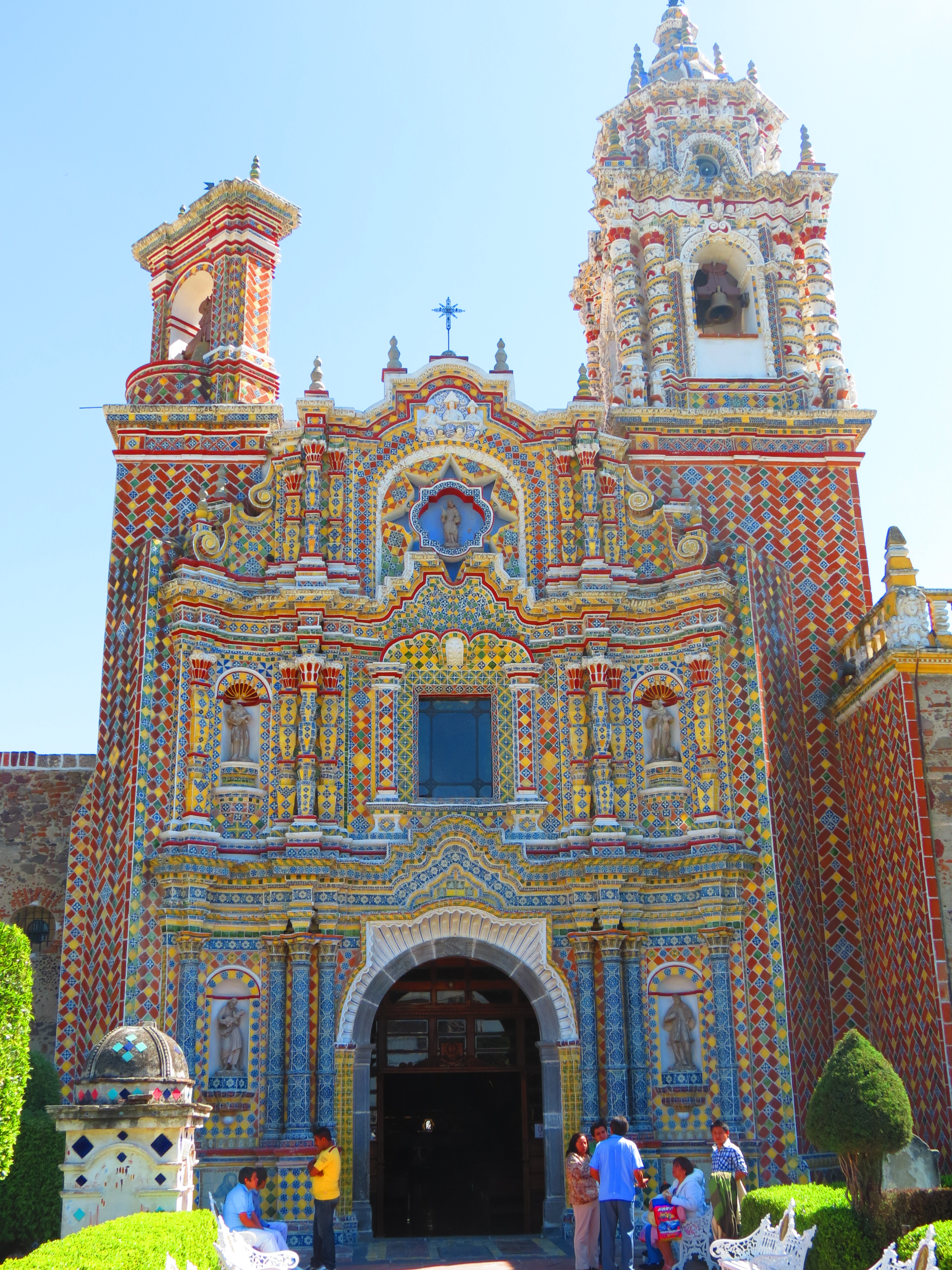
Baroque – Church of San Francisco Acatepec, San Andrés Cholula, Mexico, unknown artchitect, 17th–18th centuries

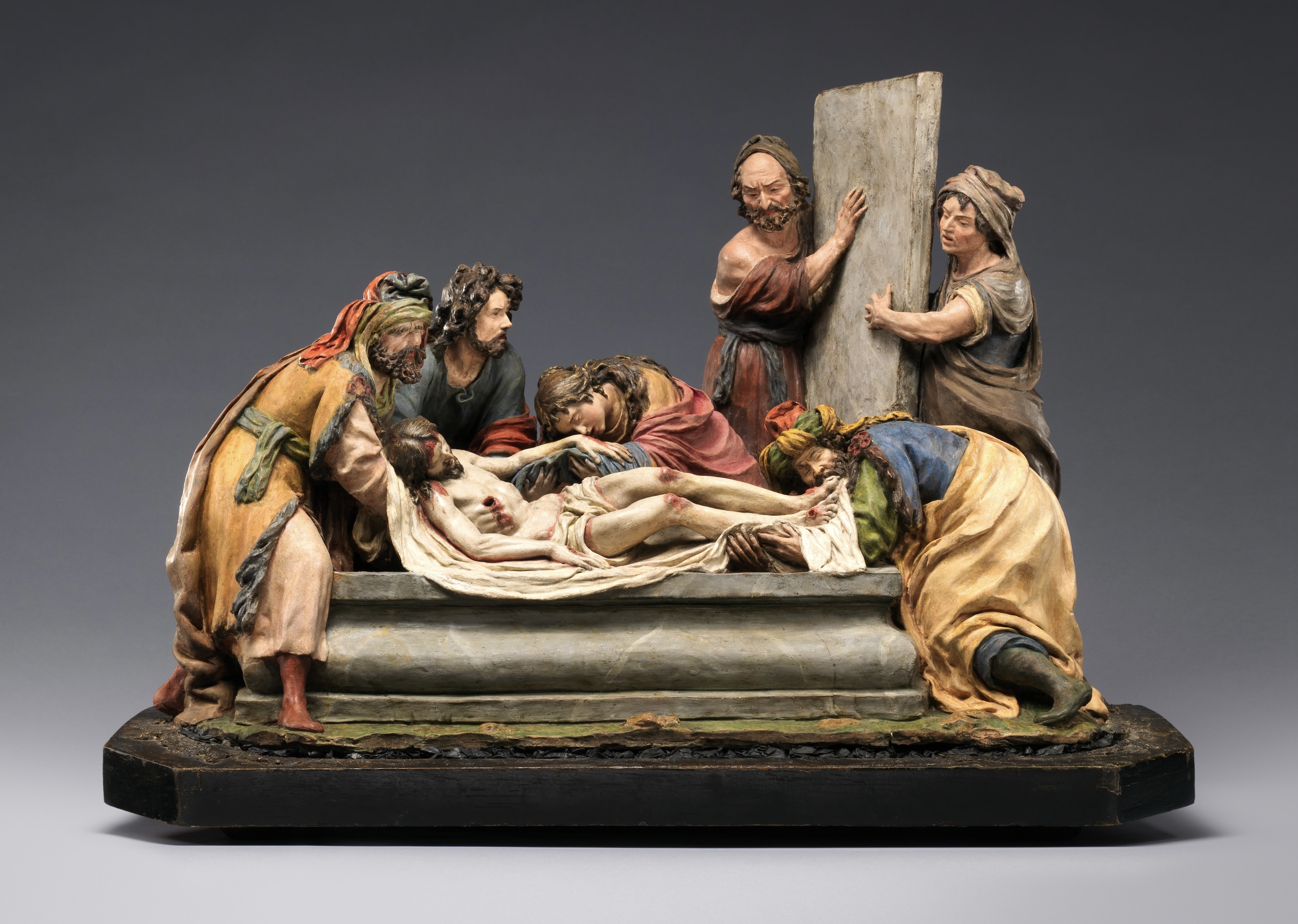
Baroque – The Entombment of Christ, by Luisa Roldán, 1700–1701, polychrome terracotta, Metropolitan Museum of Art, New York City

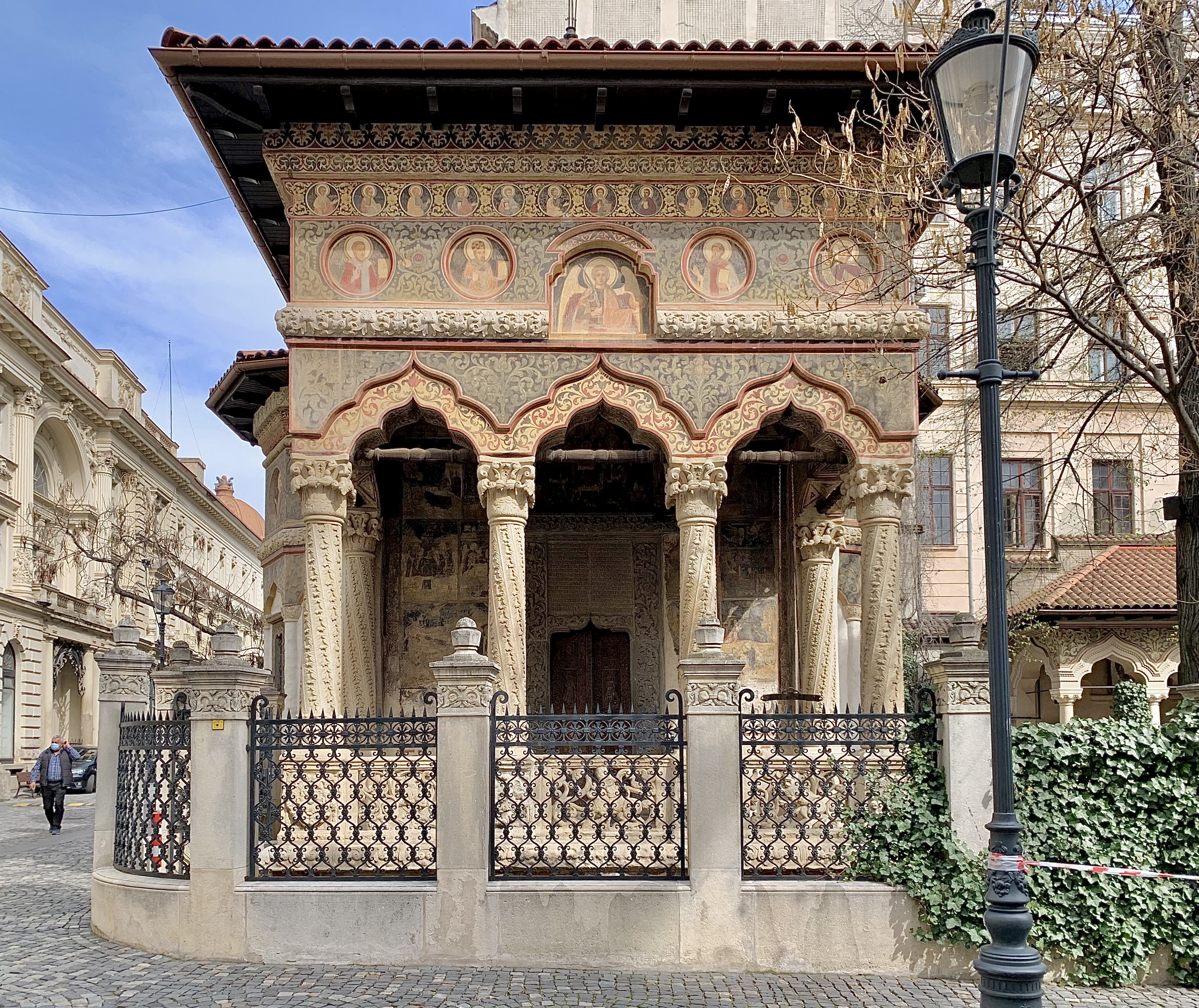
Brâncovenesc – Stavropoleos Monastery Church, Bucharest, Romania, unknown architect, 1724

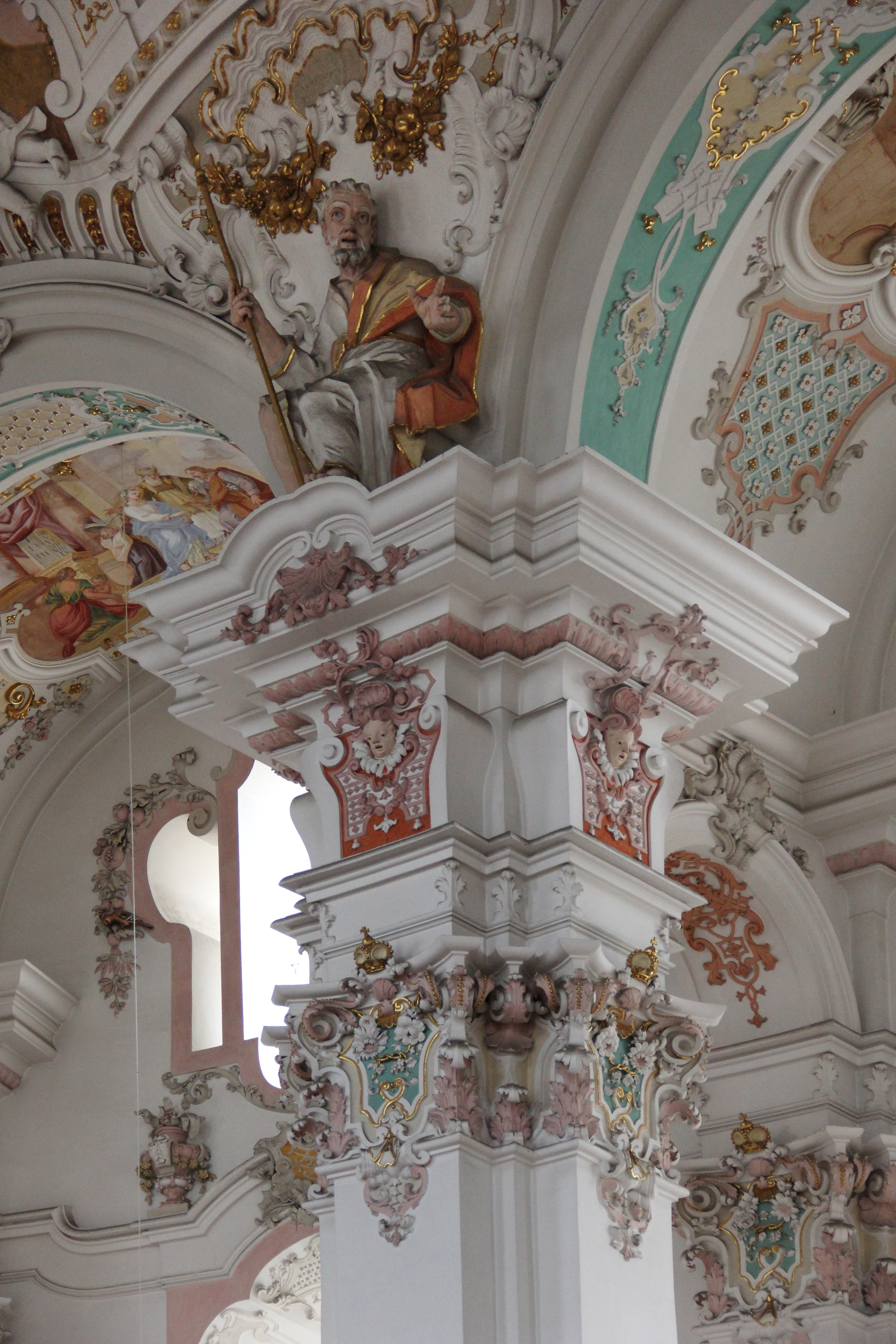
Rococo – Capitals in the Wallfahrtskirche Steinhausen, Steinhausen, Germany, by Dominikus Zimmermann, 1728–1733

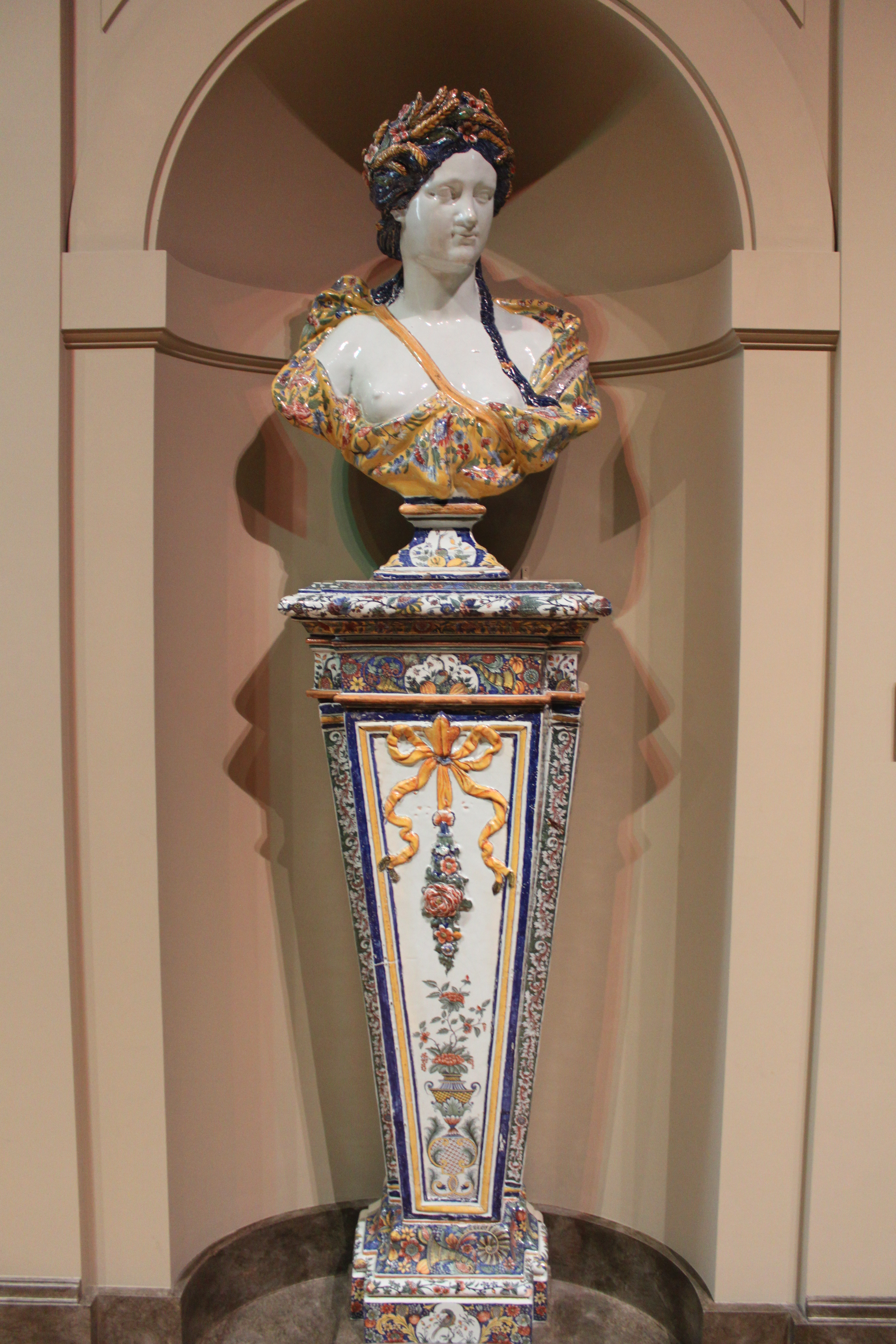
Baroque – Summer as Ceres, part of a series of anthropomorphic busts of the four seasons, a polychrome example of Rouen faience, c. 1730, faience, Louvre

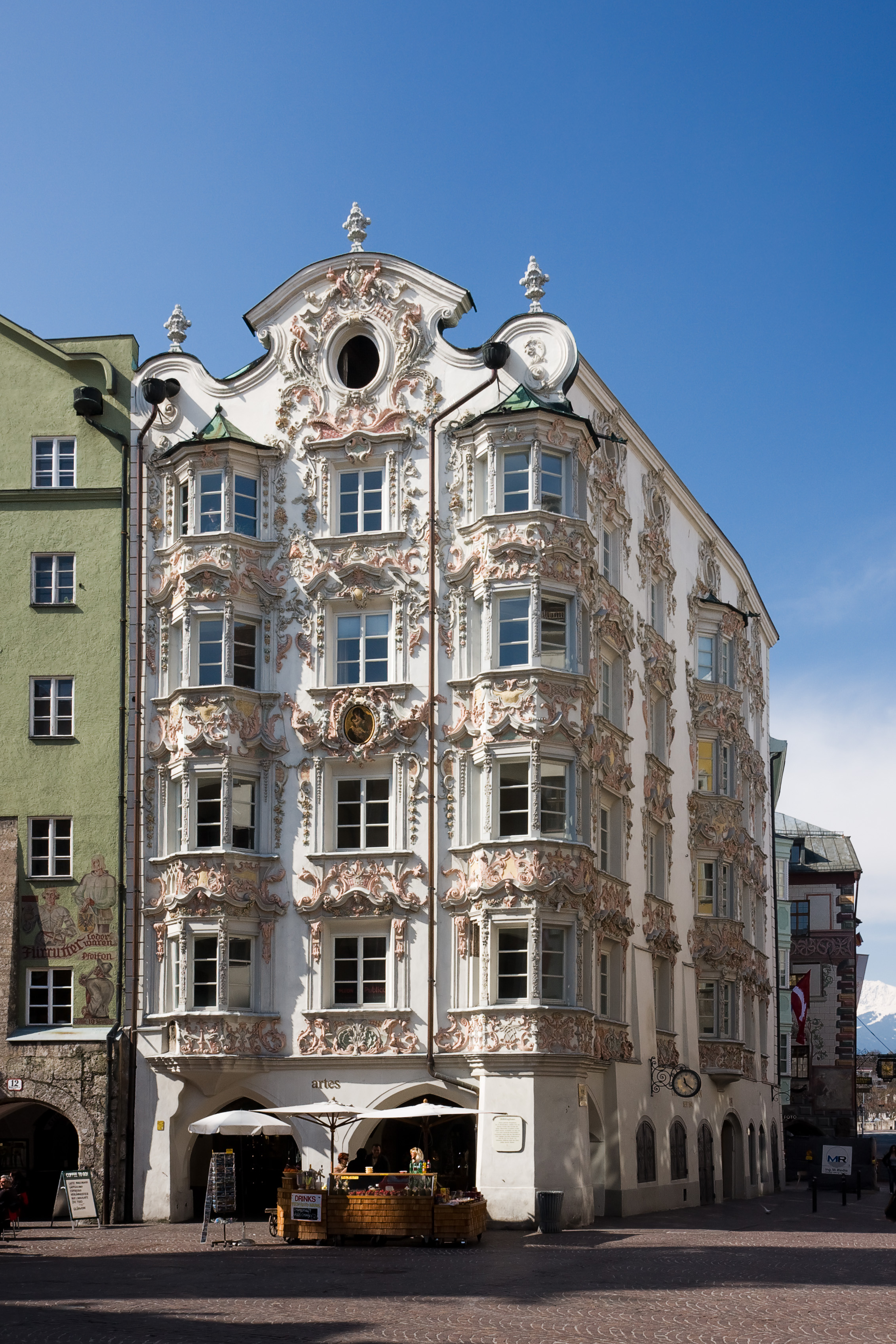
Rococo – Helbling House, Innsbruck, Austria, originally Gothic town house from the 15th century, renovated at the beginning of the 18th, and finished in 1732 by Anton Gigl

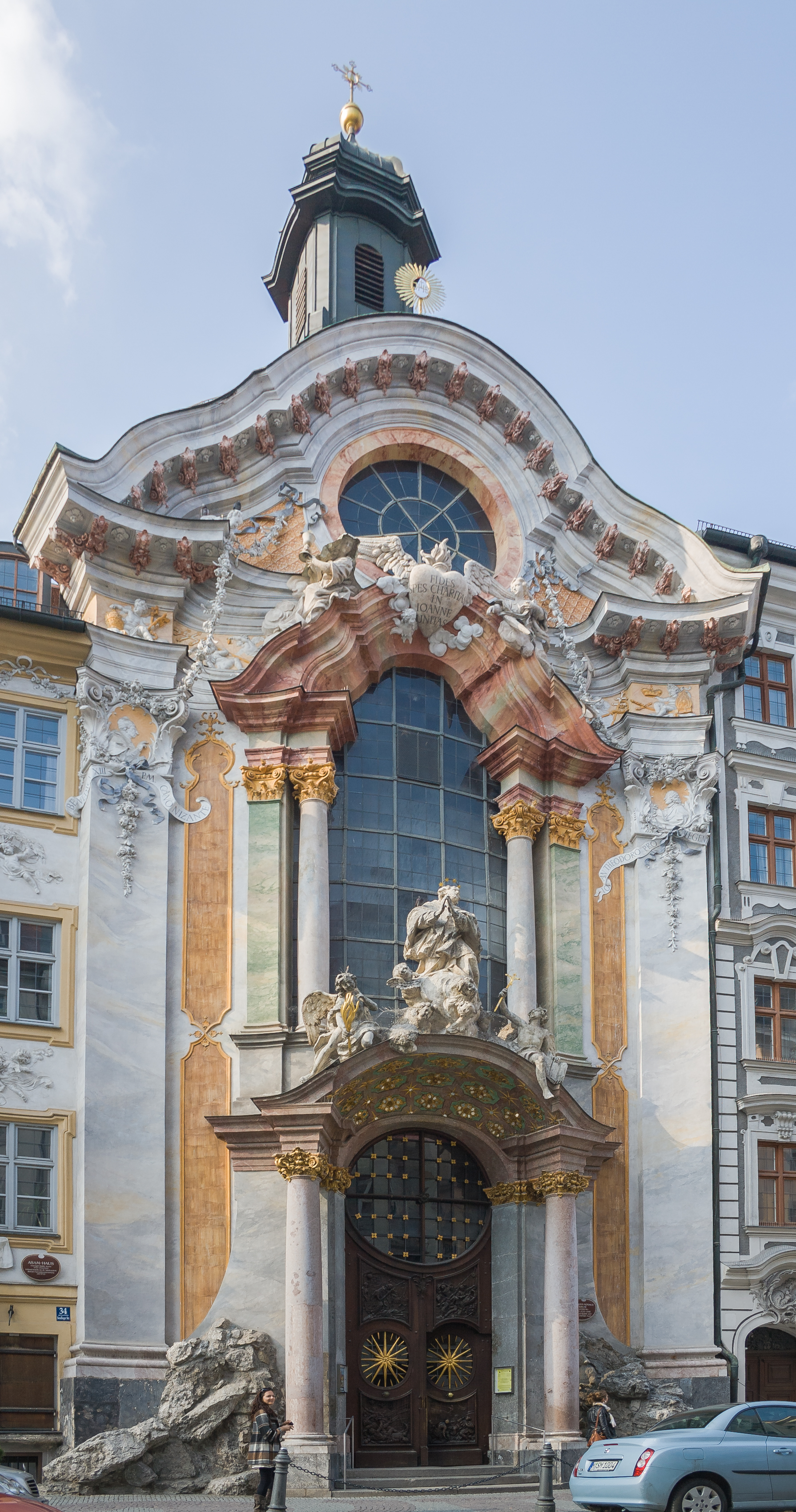
Rococo – St. Johann Nepomuk, Munich, Germany, by Egid Quirin Asam and Cosmas Damian Asam, 1733–1746

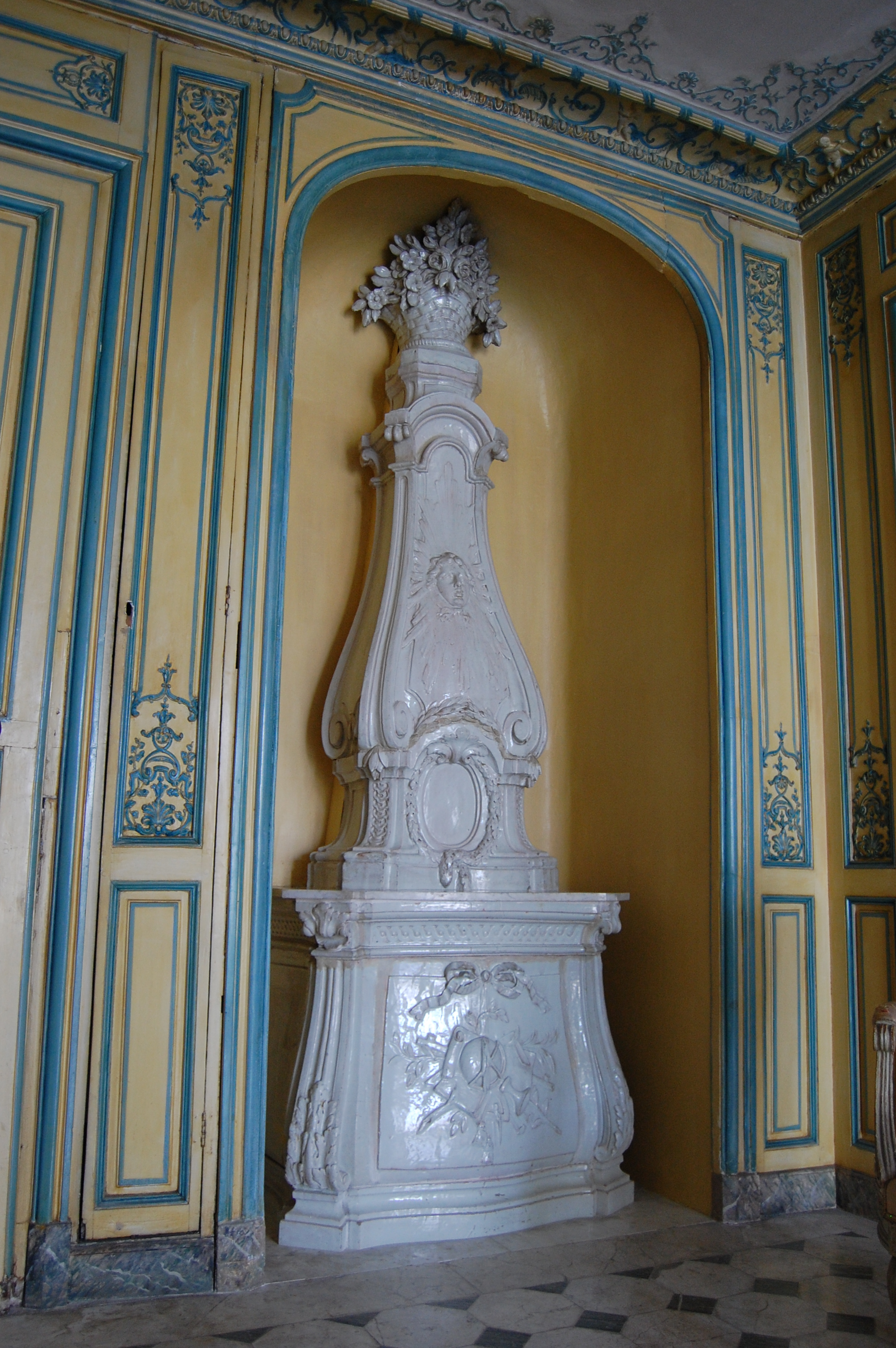
Rococo – Apartment of Madame du Barry, Palace of Versailles, Versailles, France, by Ange-Jacques Gabriel, 18th century

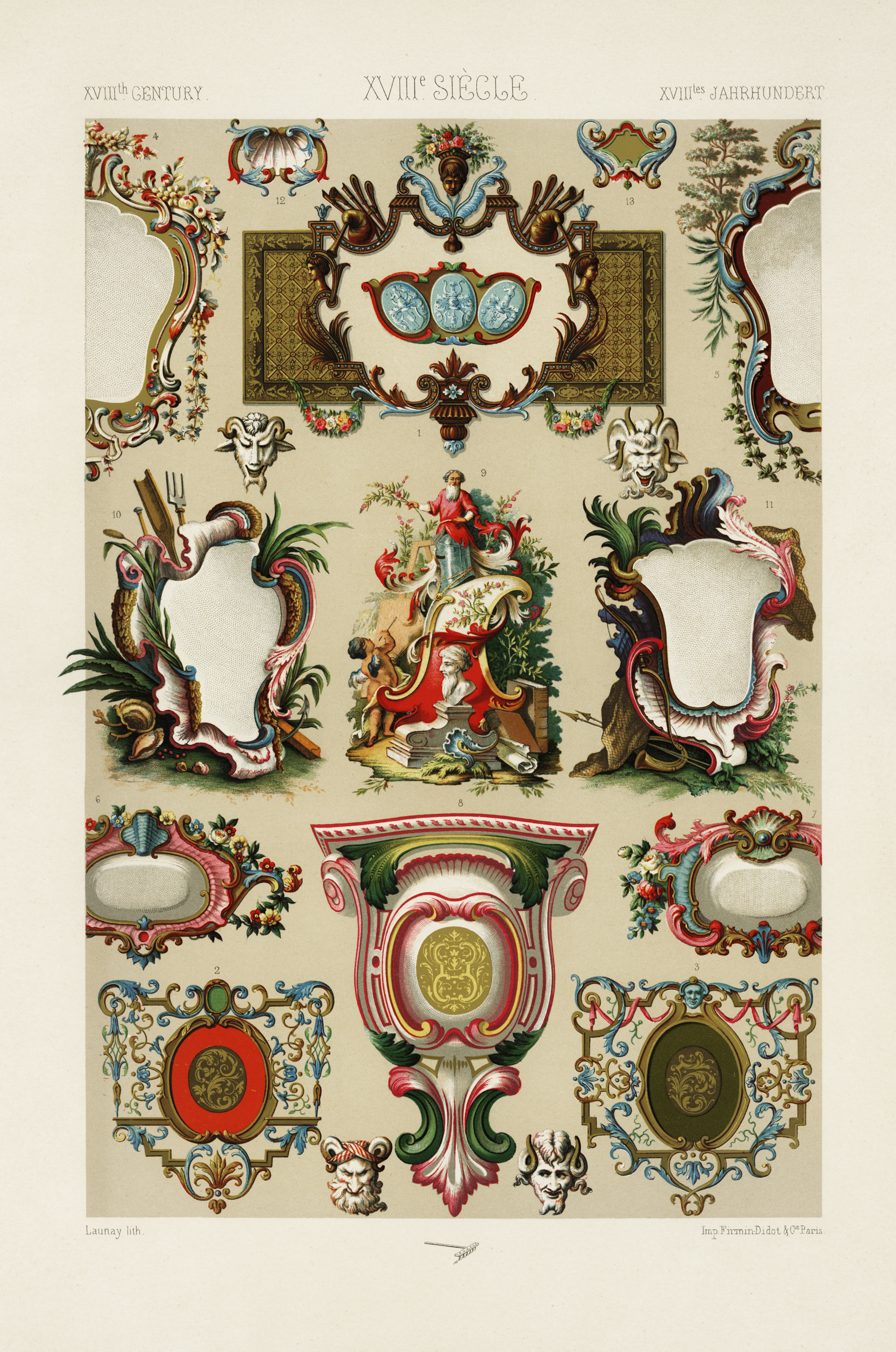
Rococo – Illustration of 18th century cartouches, from L'ornement Polychrome, by Albert Racinet, 1888

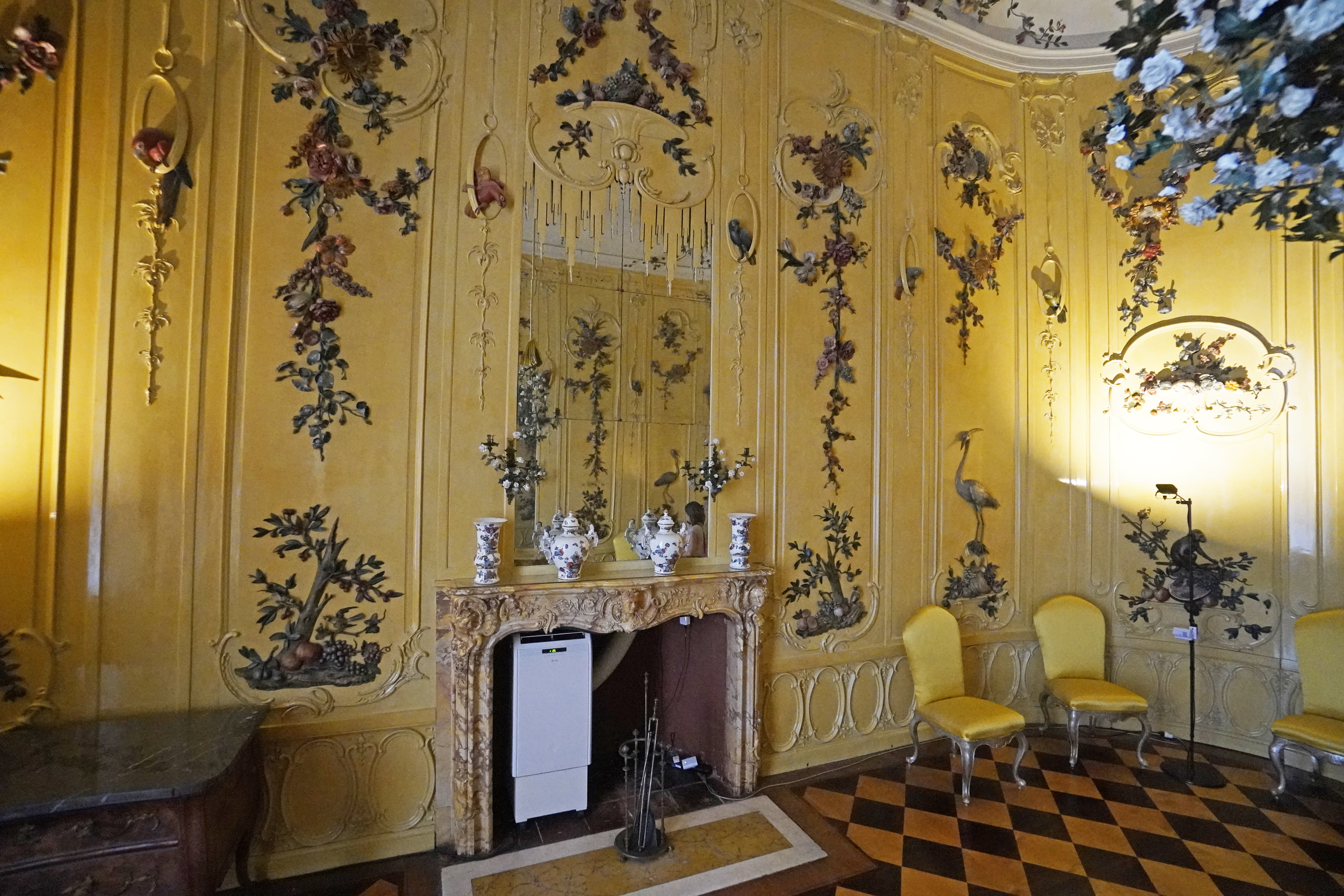
Rococo – fourth guest room, so-called Voltaire Room, Sanssouci, Potsdam, Germany, designed by Georg Wenzeslaus von Knobelsdorff, with decoration by Johann Michael the Elder and Johann Christian Hoppenhaupt the Younger, 1752–1753

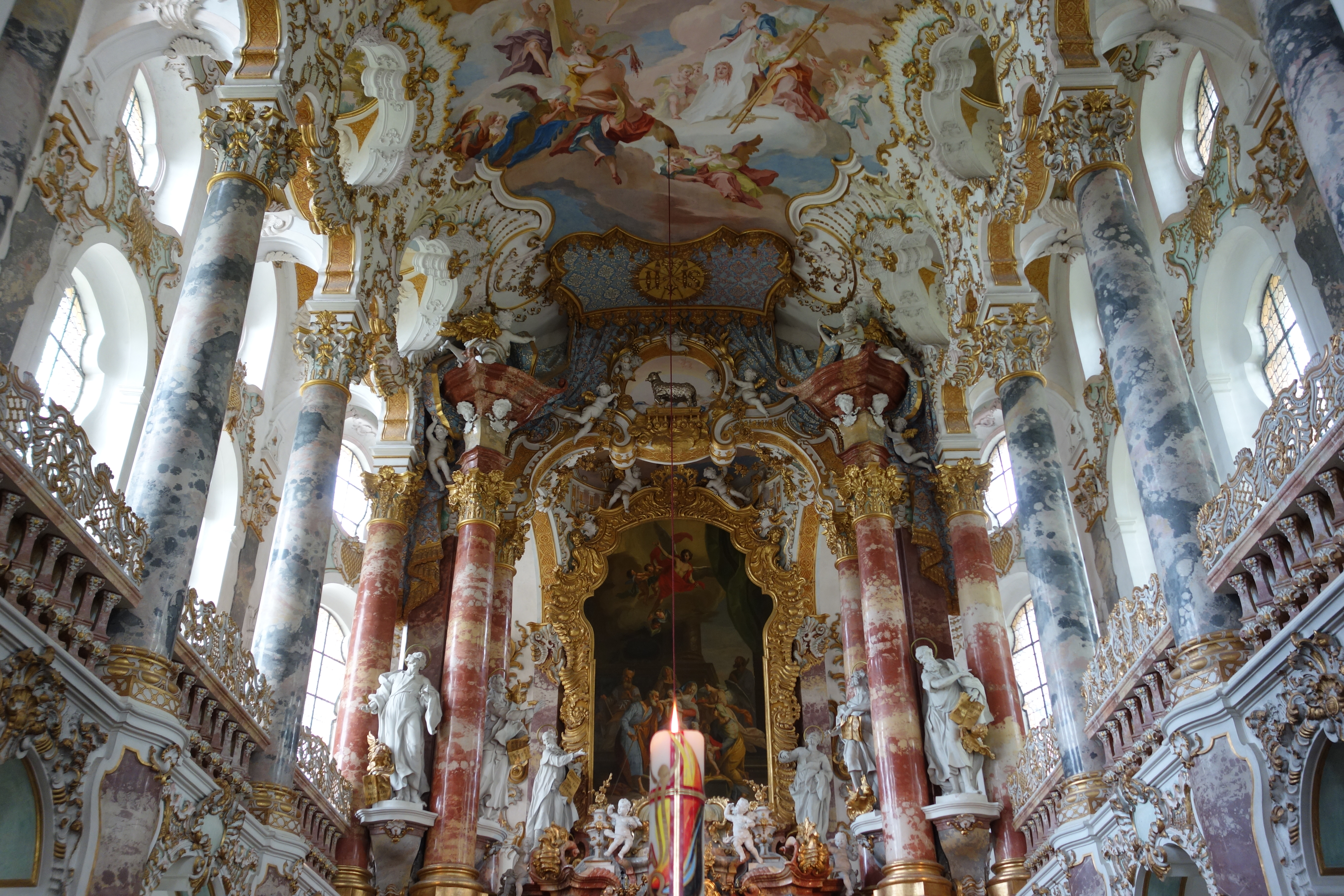
Rococo – Pilgrimage Church of Wies, Steingaden, Germany, by Dominikus and Johann Baptist Zimmermann, 1754

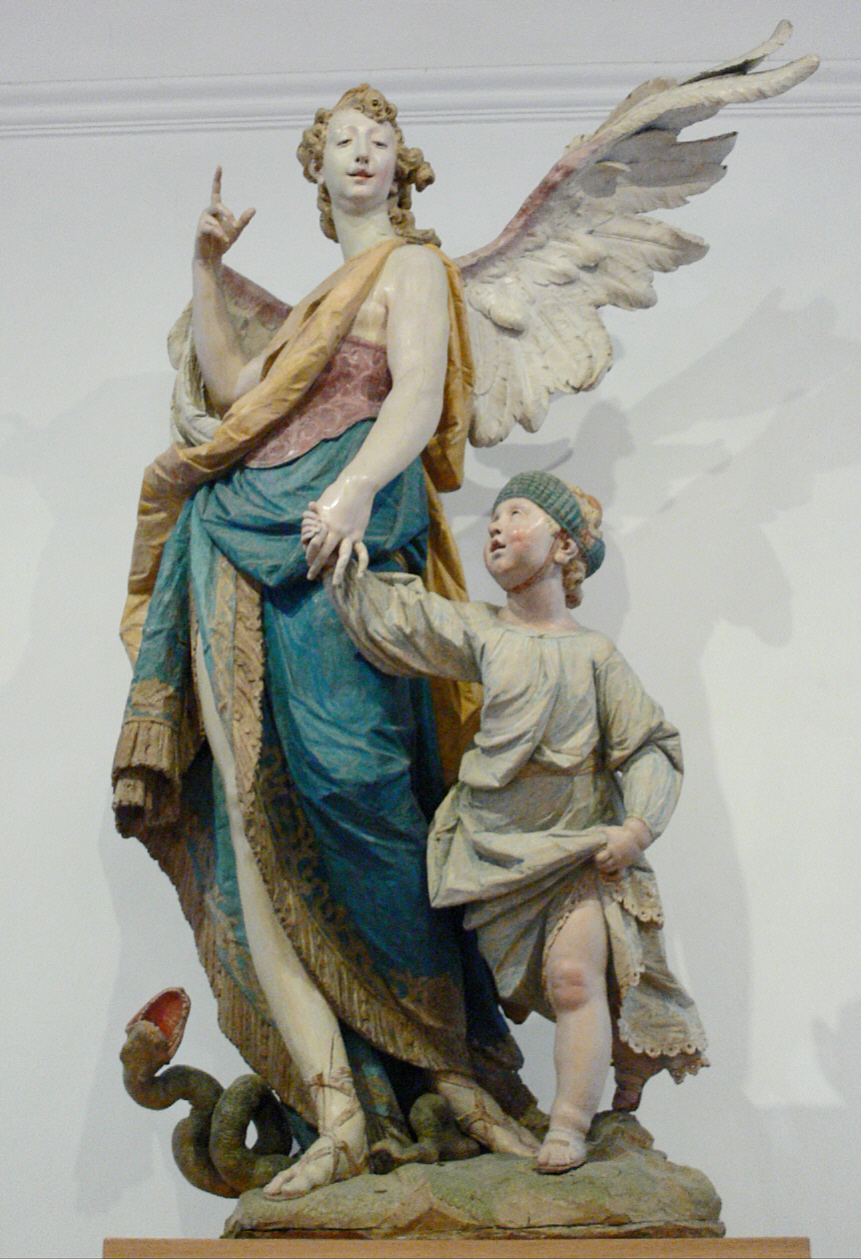
Rococo – Tobias and the Angel, by Ignaz Günther, 1763, limewood, Bürgersaalkirche, Munich, Germany

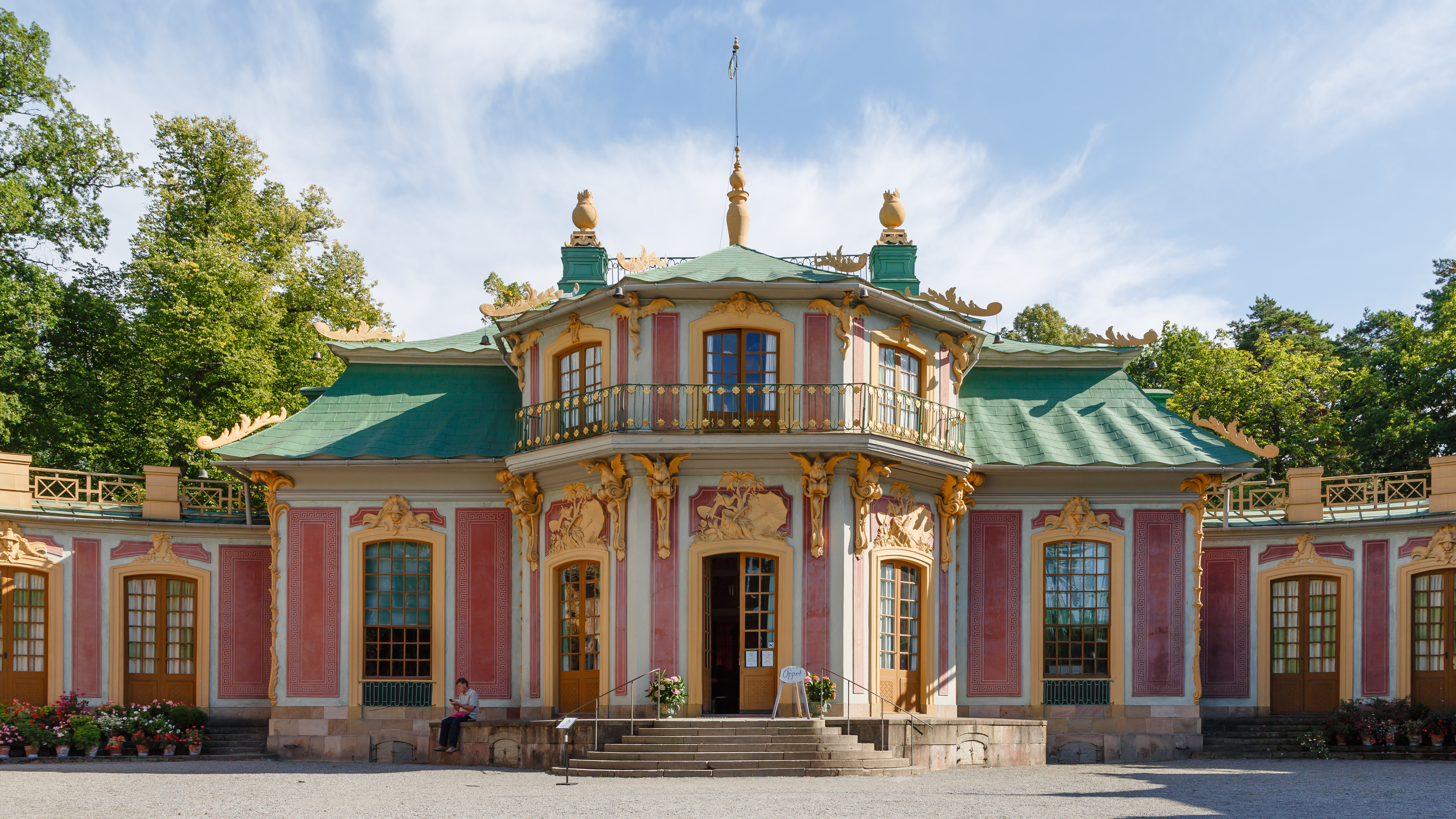
Chinoiserie – Chinese Pavilion (Ekerö Municipality, Sweden), 1763–1769, by Carl Fredrik Adelcrantz

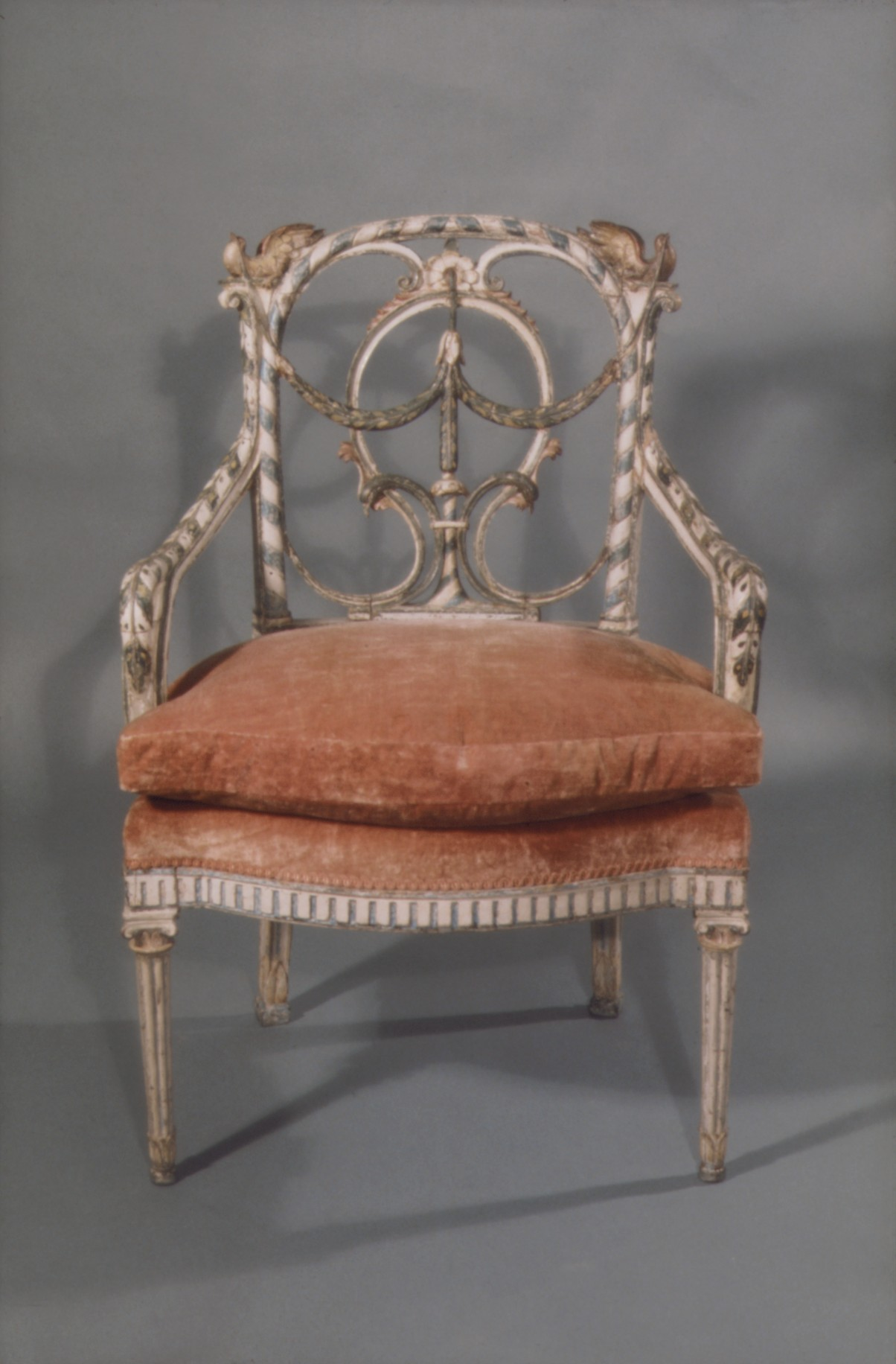
Neoclassical – armchair, c. 1780, carved and polychromed walnut, received upholstered in beige silk brocade, currently upholstered with modern cotton and linen velvet, Metropolitan Museum of Art

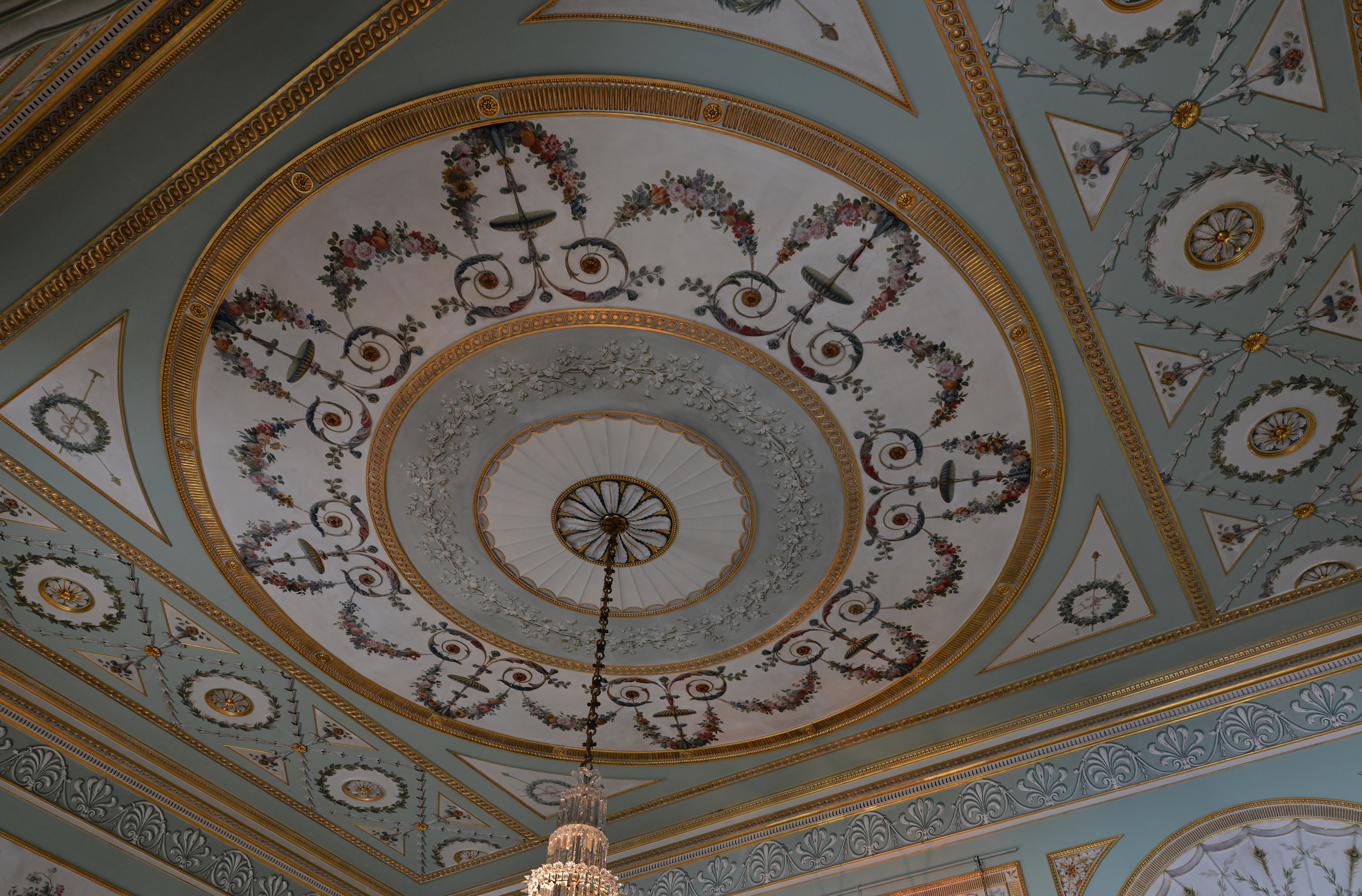
Louis XVI style – Ceiling decorated with festoons in the State Dining Room, Inveraray Castle, Scotland, the UK, by Girard and Guinand, 1784

=== Porcelain ===
With the arrival of European porcelain in the 18th century, brightly colored pottery figurines with a wide range of colors became very popular. Porcelain was developed in China in the 9th century. Its recipe was kept secret from other nations, and only successfully copied in the 15th century by the Japanese and Vietnamese. During the 18th century, German kilns finally figured out how to make porcelain, beginning with the alchemist Johann Friedrich Böttger and the physicist Ehrenfried Walther von Tschirnhaus, who made the first European variety in 1709. The Meissen Porcelain Factory was founded in the following year, and it became the leading European porcelain manufacturer. Later, other kilns stole the recipe or came up with their own porcelain technology. Another really famous factory was the Sèvres, which produced stunning porcelain for the French elite during the 18th, 19th and 20th centuries.

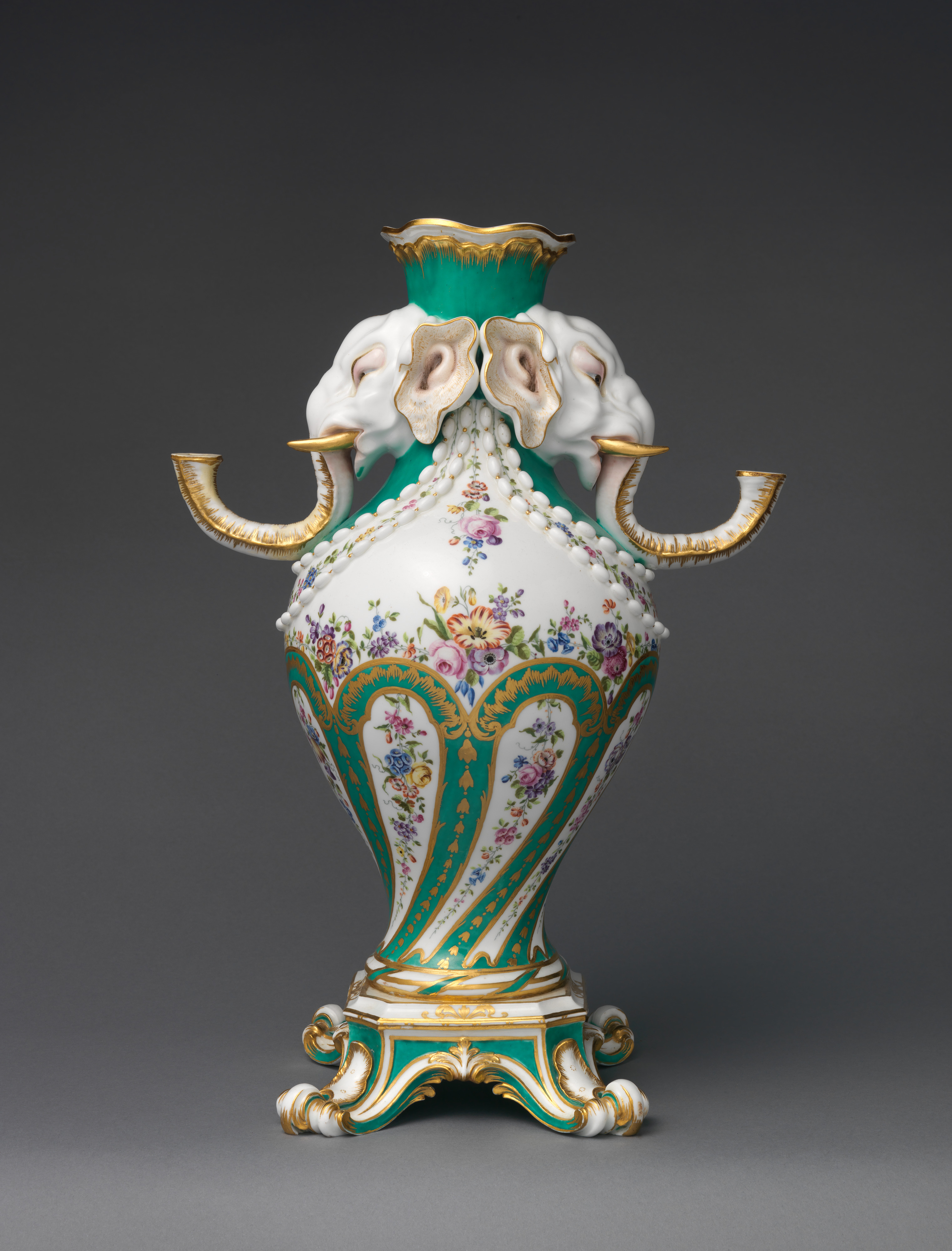
Rococo – elephant-head vase (vase à tête d'éléphant), by the Sèvres porcelain factory, c. 1756 – c. 1762, soft-paste porcelain, Metropolitan Museum of Art

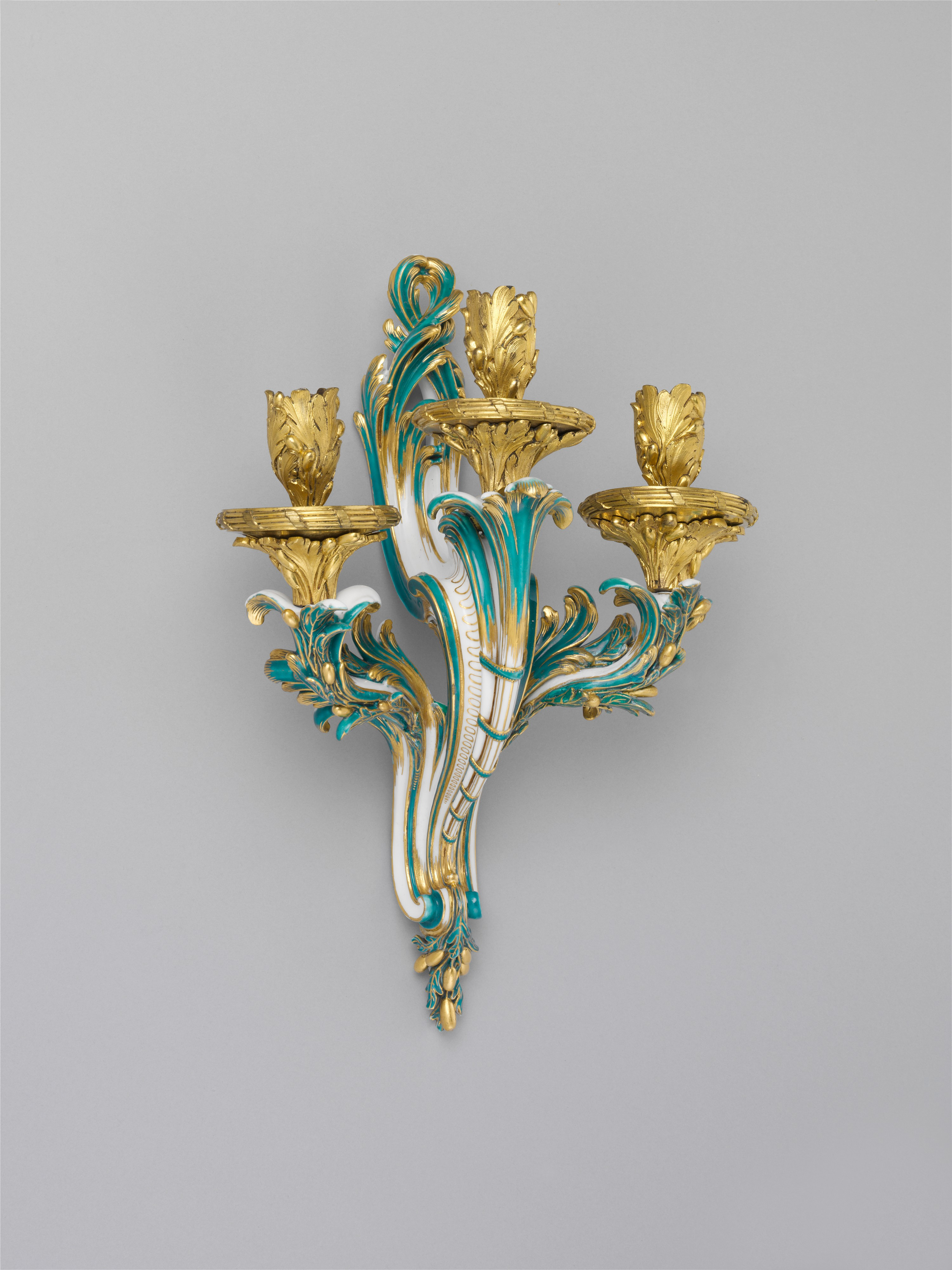
Rococo – wall sconce (bras de cheminée), by the Sèvres porcelain factory, c. 1761, soft-paste porcelain and gilt bronze, Metropolitan Museum of Art

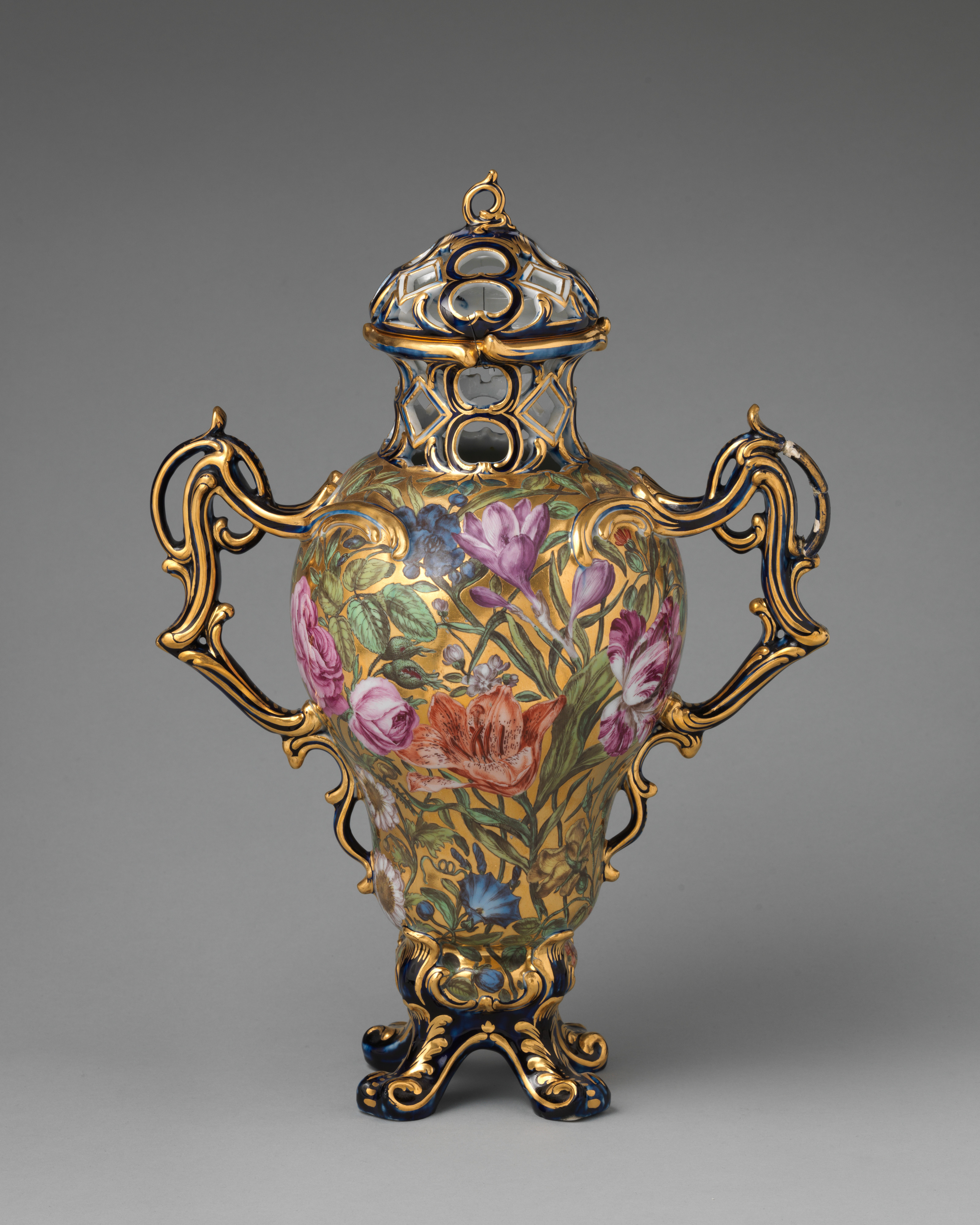
Rococo – perfume vase, by the Chelsea porcelain factory, c. 1761, soft-paste porcelain and burnished gold ground, Metropolitan Museum of Art

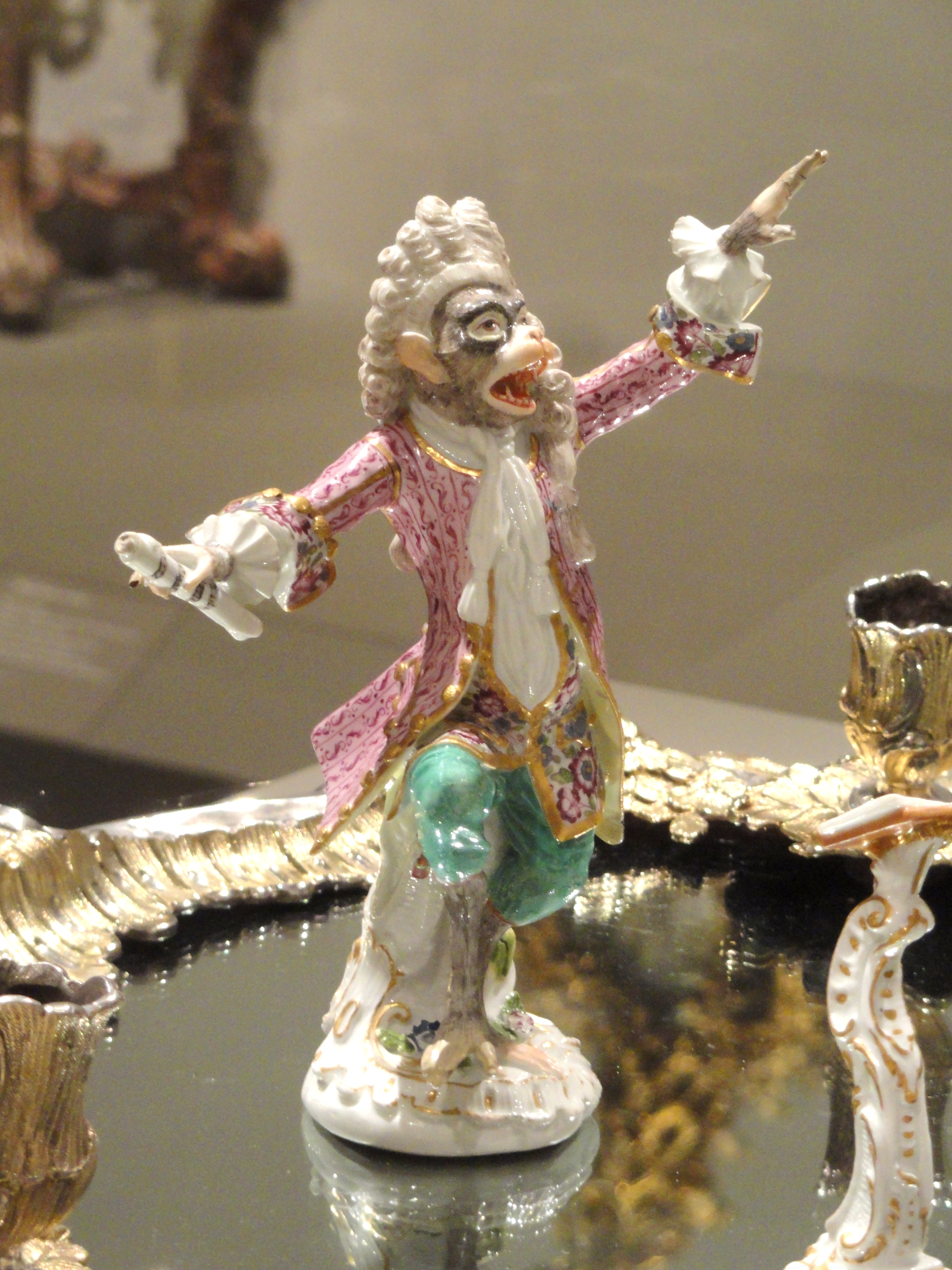
Rococo – singerie figurine, part of a monkey band, by the Meissen porcelain factory, c. 1765, porcelain, enamel and gilding, Art Institute of Chicago, Chicago, US

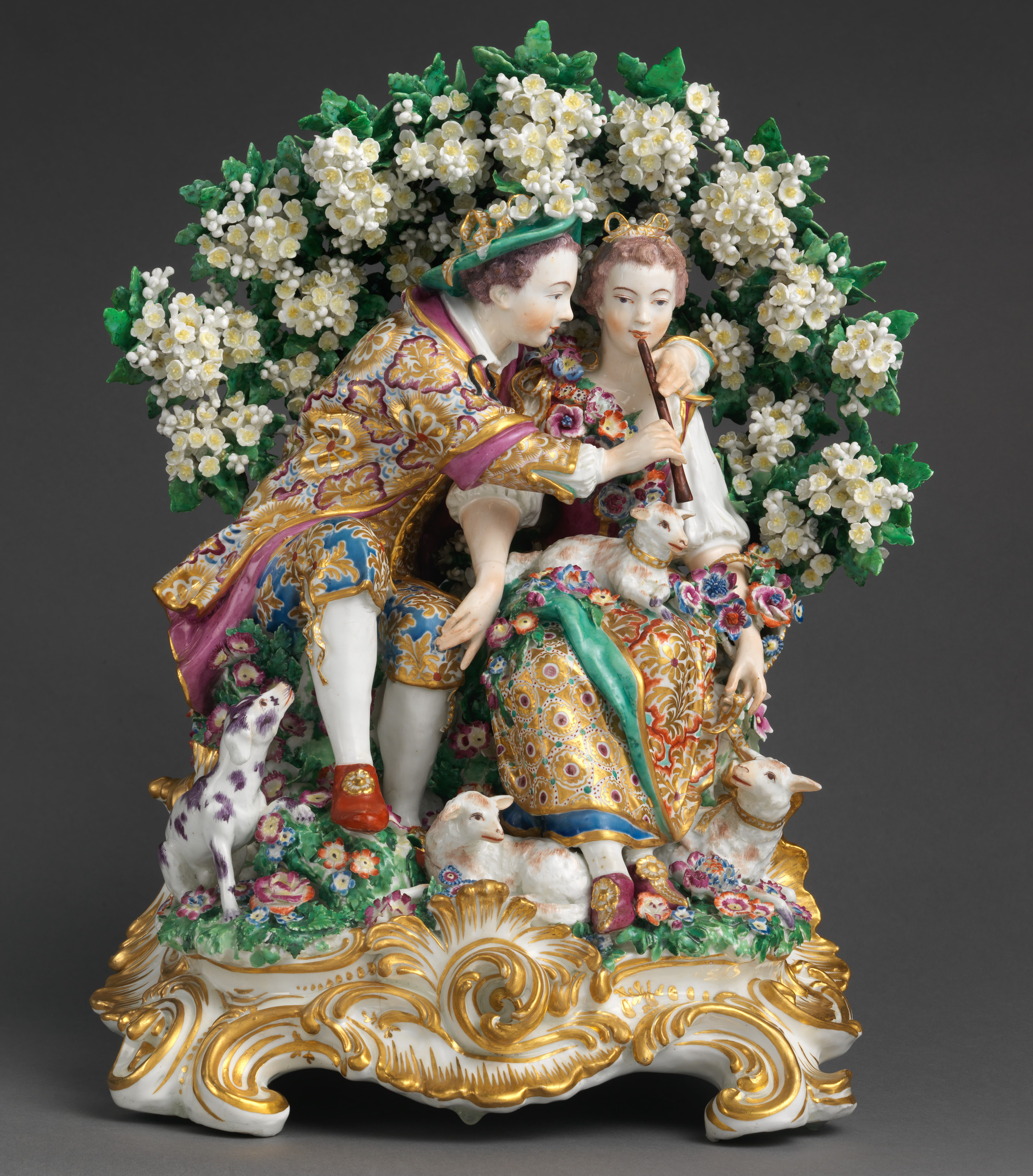
Rococo – The Music Lesson, by the Chelsea porcelain factory, c. 1765, soft-paste porcelain, Metropolitan Museum of Art

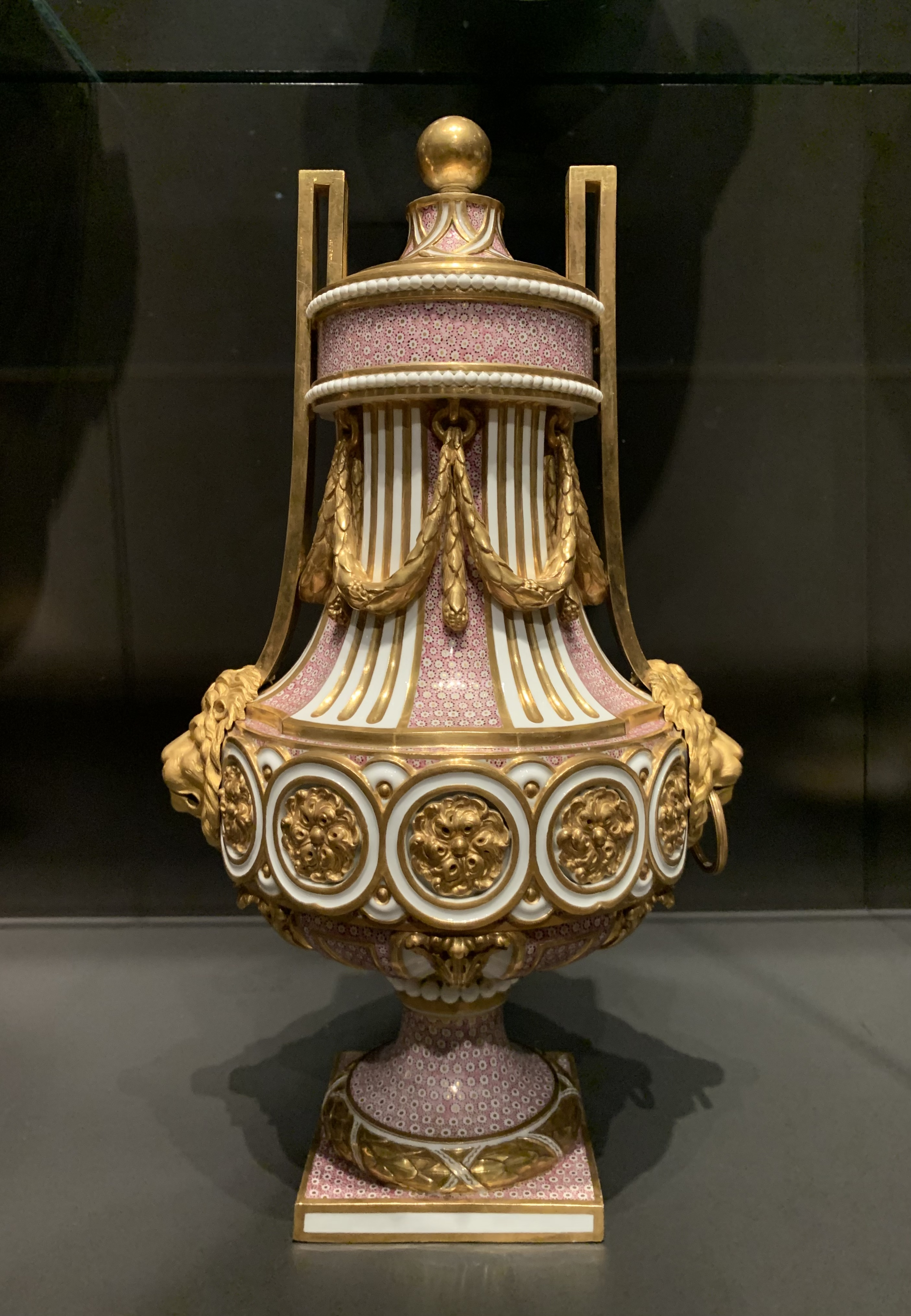
Louis XVI style – Vase (vase grec Duplessis rectifié), design attributed to Jean-Claude Chambellan Duplessis, painted decoration by Vincent Taillandier, gilding by Jean Pierre Boulanger, by the Sèvres porcelain factory, 1780, painted and gilded hard-paste porcelain, gilt bronze, Rijksmuseum Amsterdam, the Netherlands

== 19th century ==
Compared to the 18th century, polychromy was somewhat more widespread in the 19th. However, the facades of most buildings remained white, most sculptures were unpainted, and most furniture was in the shades of its materials. Colours were added usually though glazed ceramics on buildings, different types of stone on sculptures, and through painting or intarsia most often on furniture. Like in the 18th century, porcelain remained quite colourful, many figures being life-like. In contrast with their exteriors, interiors of many houses of the rich were often decorated with boiserie, stucco, and/or painted. Like in the 2nd half of the 18th century, multiple bronze clocks and decorative objects have two tints through gilding and patina. Porcelain elements were also added for more colour.

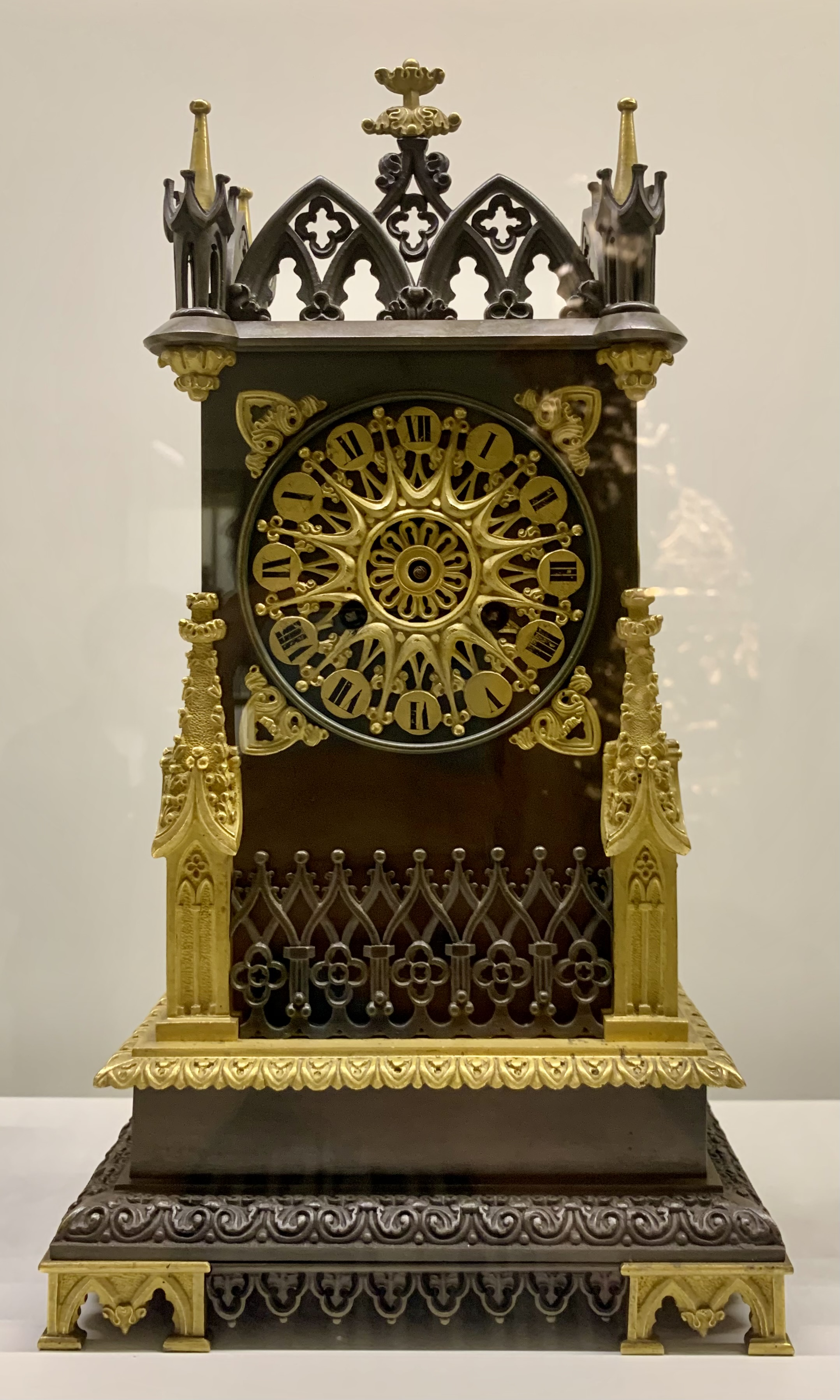
Gothic Revival clock, c. 1835 – c. 1850, gilt and patinated bronze, Museum of Decorative Arts, Paris

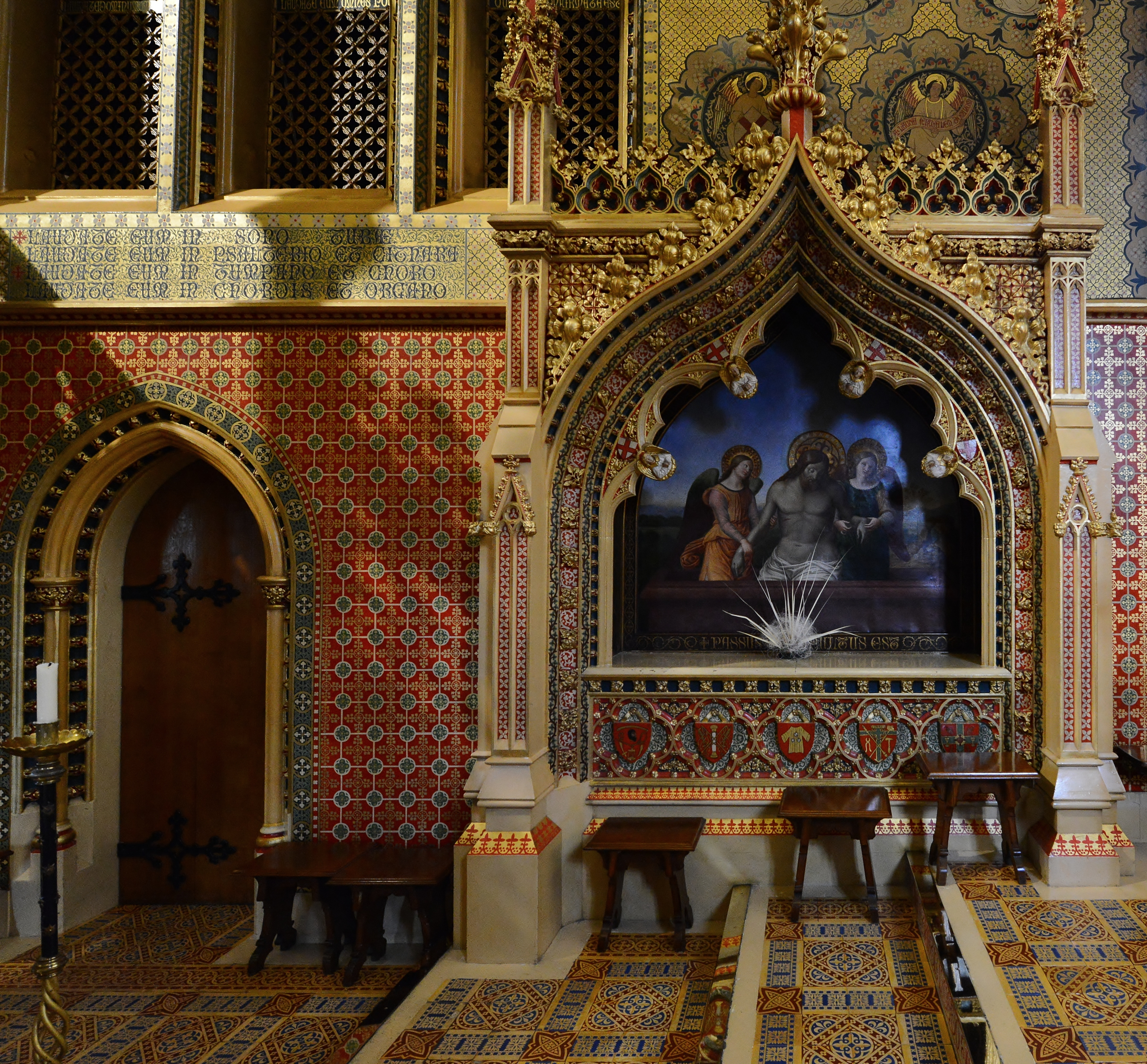
Gothic Revival – Interior of the St Giles' Catholic Church, Cheadle, Staffordshire, the UK, by Augustus Pugin, 1840–1846

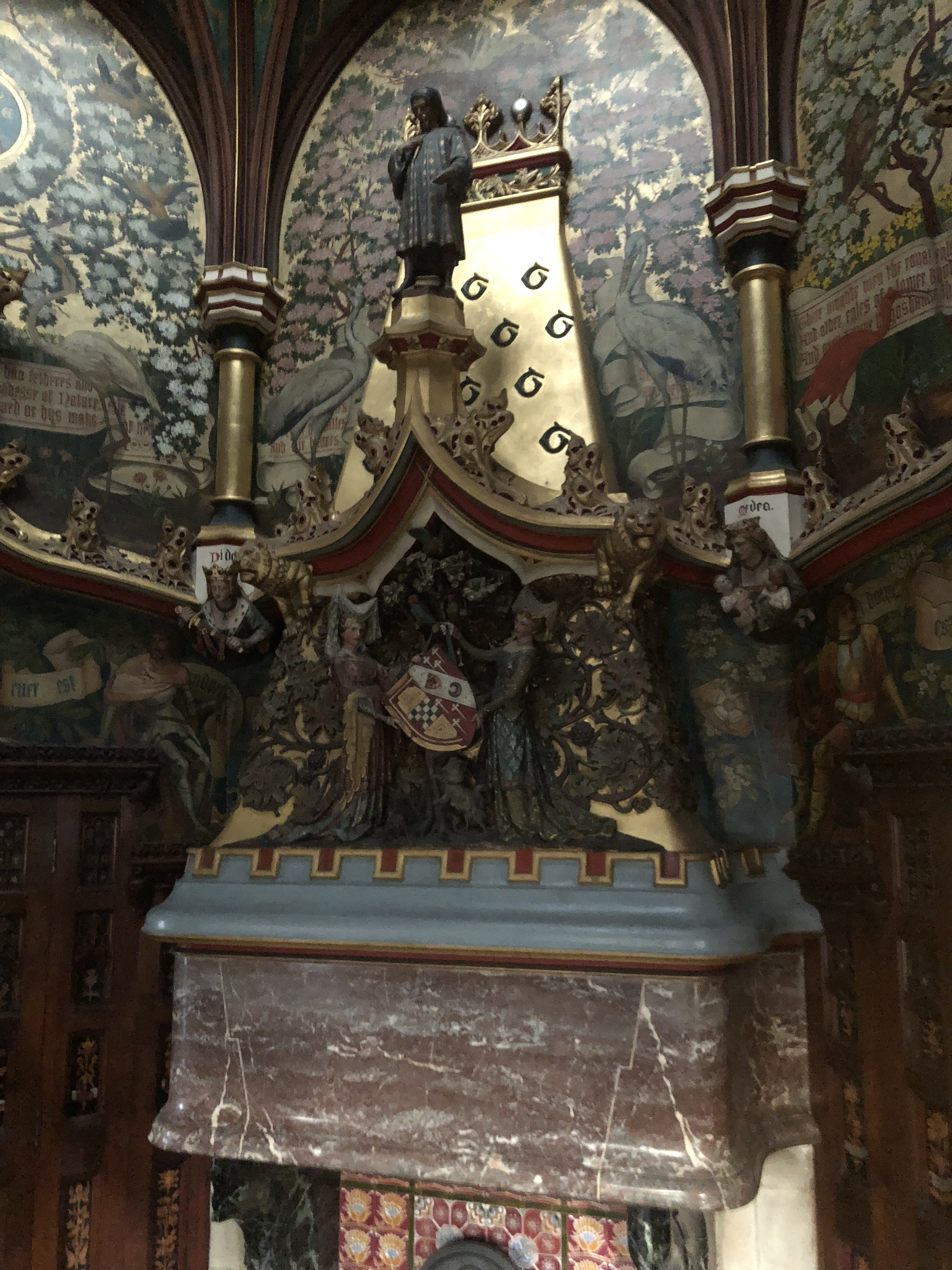
Gothic Revival – Chimney-piece in the Chaucer Room of the Cardiff Castle, Cardiff, the UK, by William Burges, c. 1877 – c. 1890

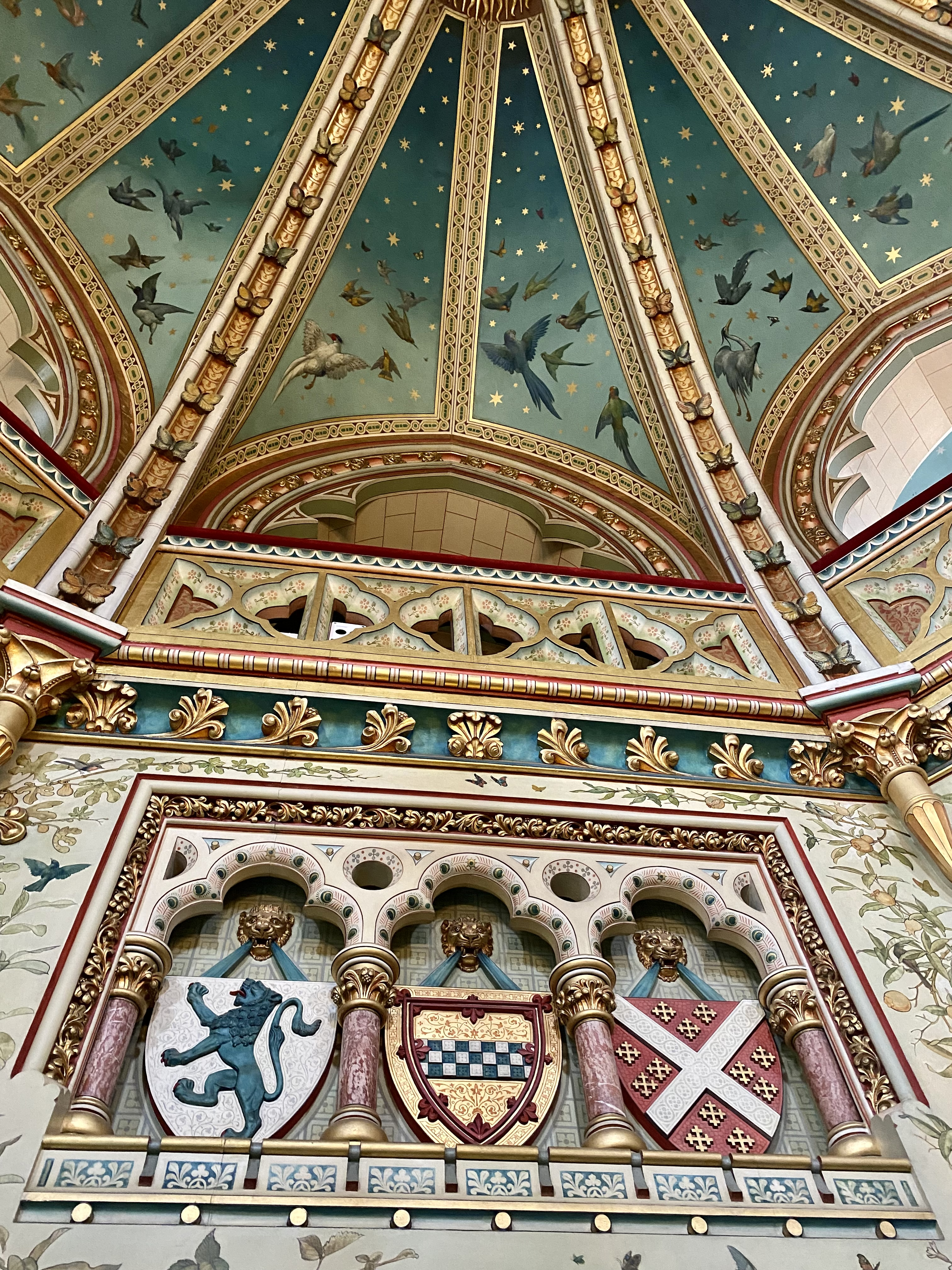
Gothic Revival – Drawing room of the Castell Coch, Tongwynlais, Wales, by William Burges, 1891

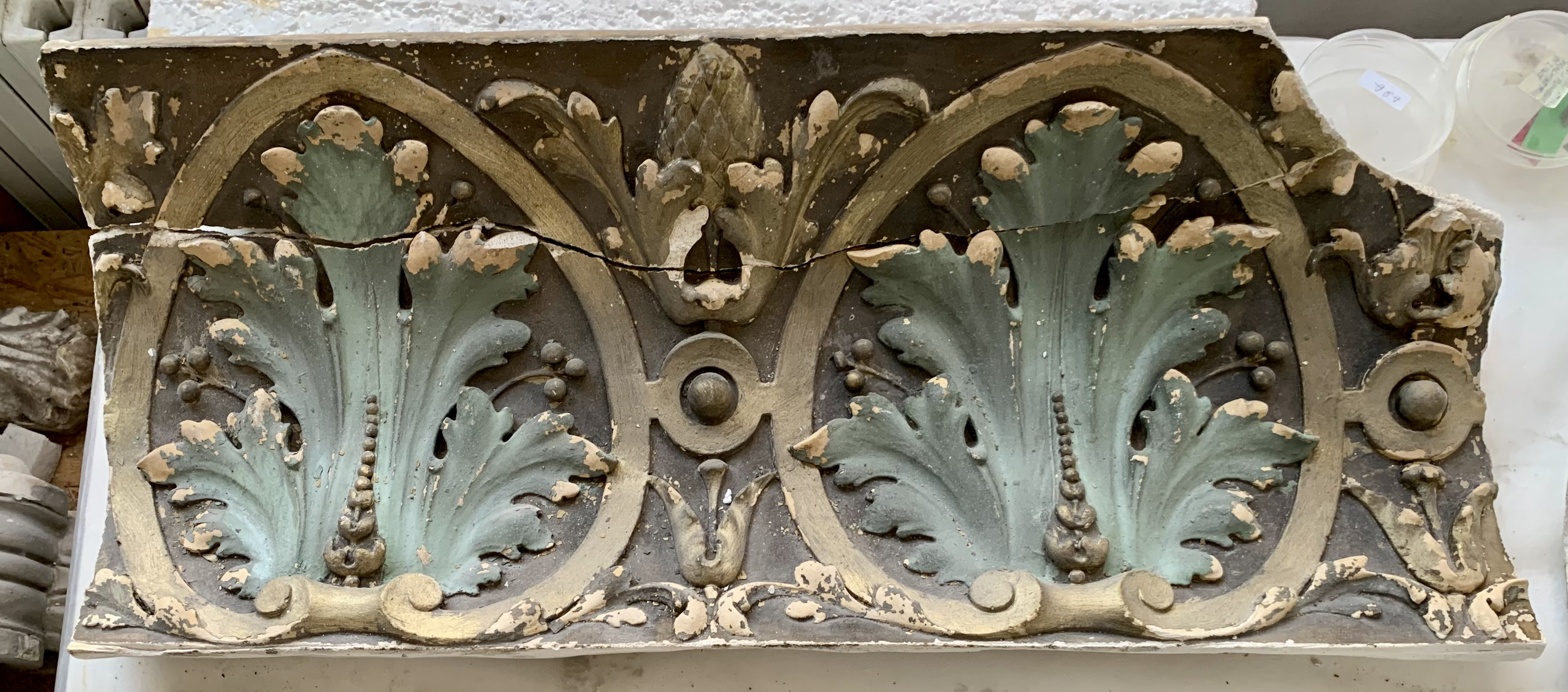
Beaux Arts – Ceiling stucco fragment from Strada Plantelor no. 4, Bucharest, Romania, unknown architect, 1891

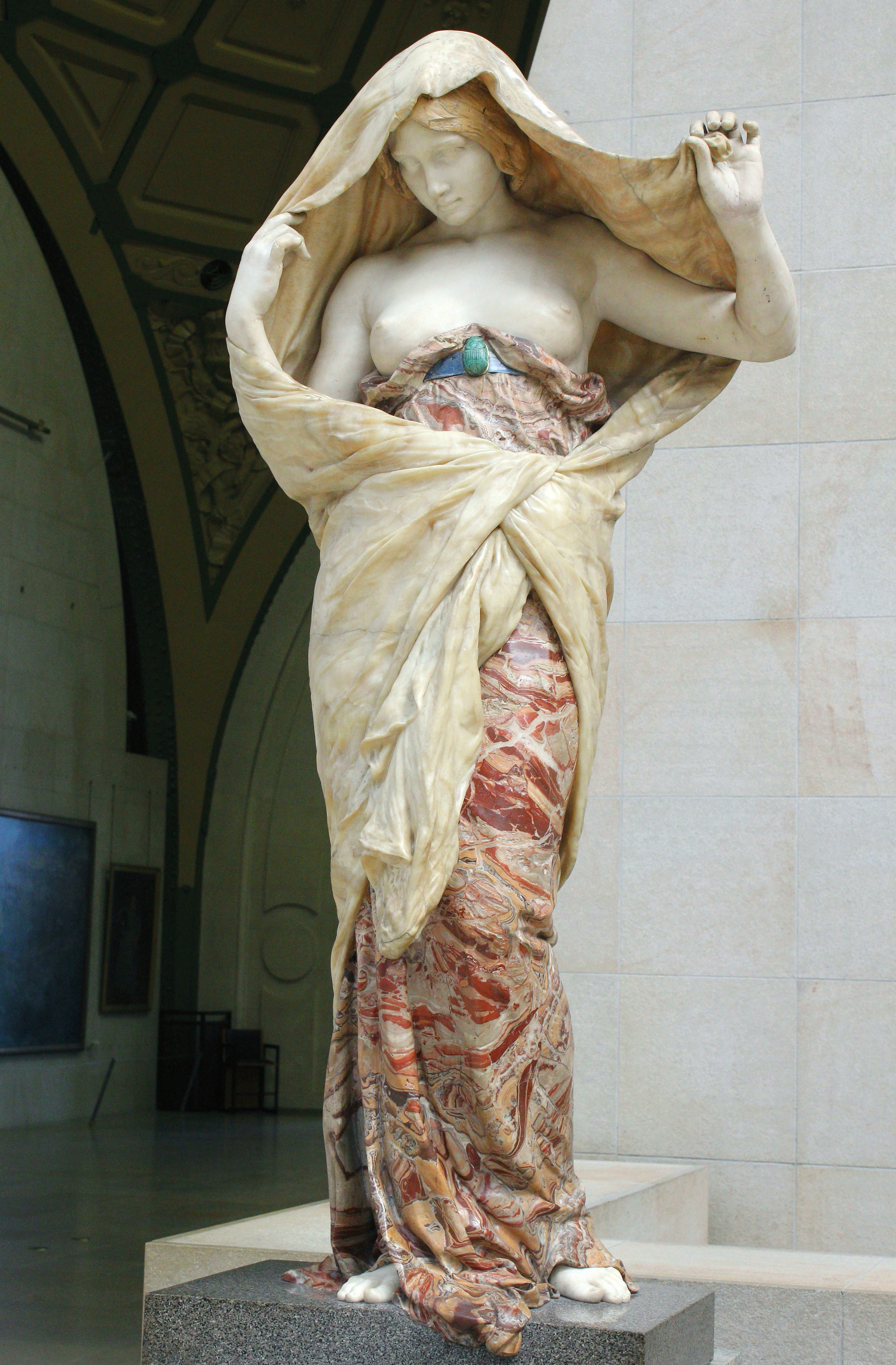
Art Nouveau – Nature Unveiling Herself Before Science, by Louis-Ernest Barrias, 1899, marble, alabaster, calcite, malachite, lapis lazuli, Musée d'Orsay, Paris

=== Neoclassicism ===
Despite evidence of polychrome being discovered on Ancient Greek architecture and sculptures, most Neoclassical buildings have white or beige facades, and black metalwork. Around 1840, the French architect Jacques Ignace Hittorff, published studies of Sicilian architecture, documenting extensive evidence of color. The "polychrome controversy" raged for over a decade and proved to be a challenge for Neoclassical architects throughout Europe.

Due to the discovery of frescos in the Roman cities Pompeii and Herculaneum during the 18th century, multiple 18th and 19th century Neoclassical houses have their interiors decorated with colourful Pompeian style frescos. They often feature bright red, known as "Pompeian red". The fashion for Pompeian styles of painting resulted in rooms finished in vivid blocks of colour. Examples include the Pompeian Room from the Hinxton Hall in Cambridgeshire, the Pompejanum in Aschaffenburg, Empress Joséphine's Bedroom from the Château de Malmaison, and Napoleon's bath of the Château de Rambouillet. By the beginning of the 19th century, painters were also able to create effects of marbling and graining to imitate wood.

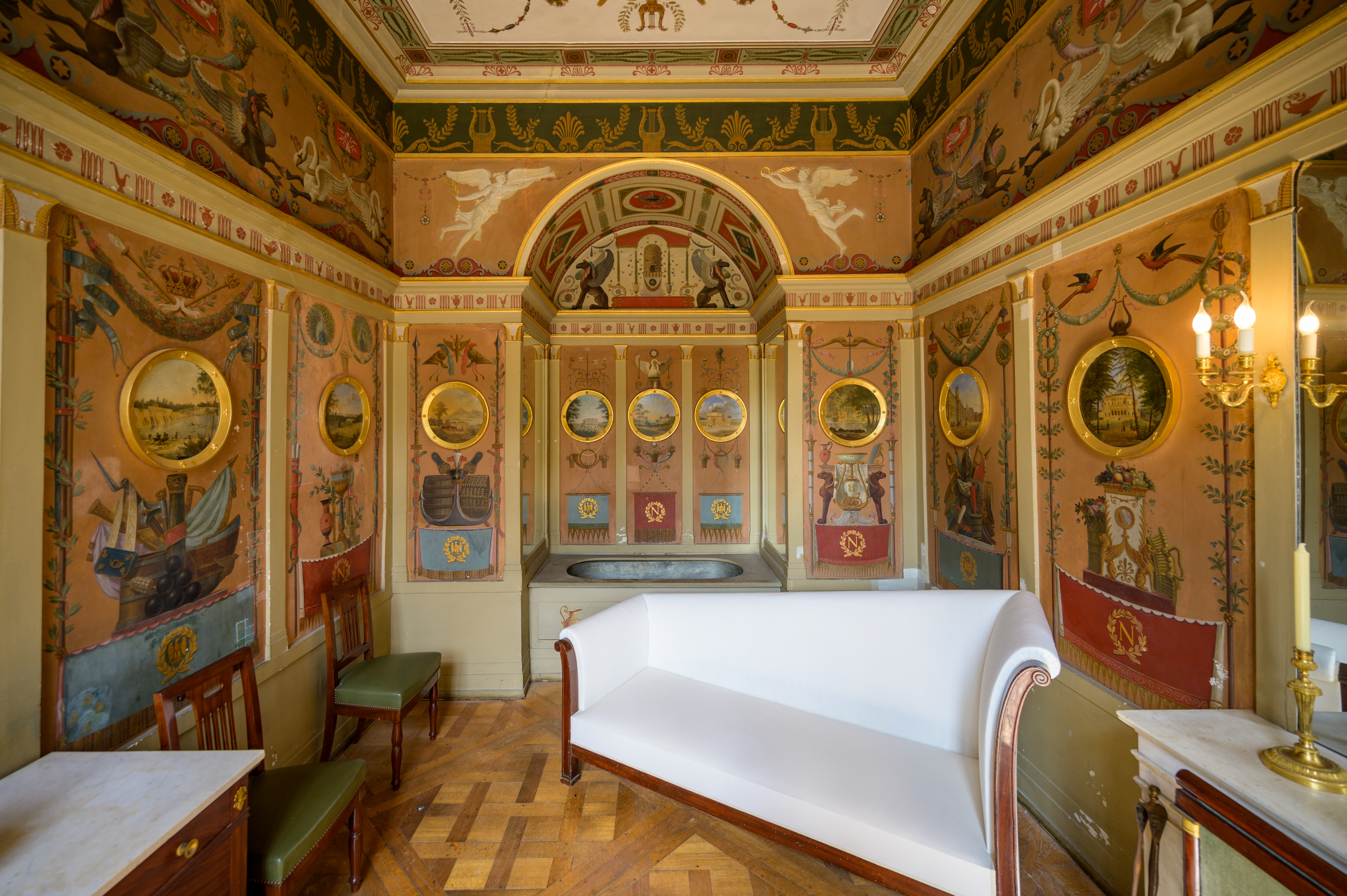
Empire style – Napoleon's bath of the Château de Rambouillet, Rambouillet, France, painted by Godard and Jean Vasserot, 1806

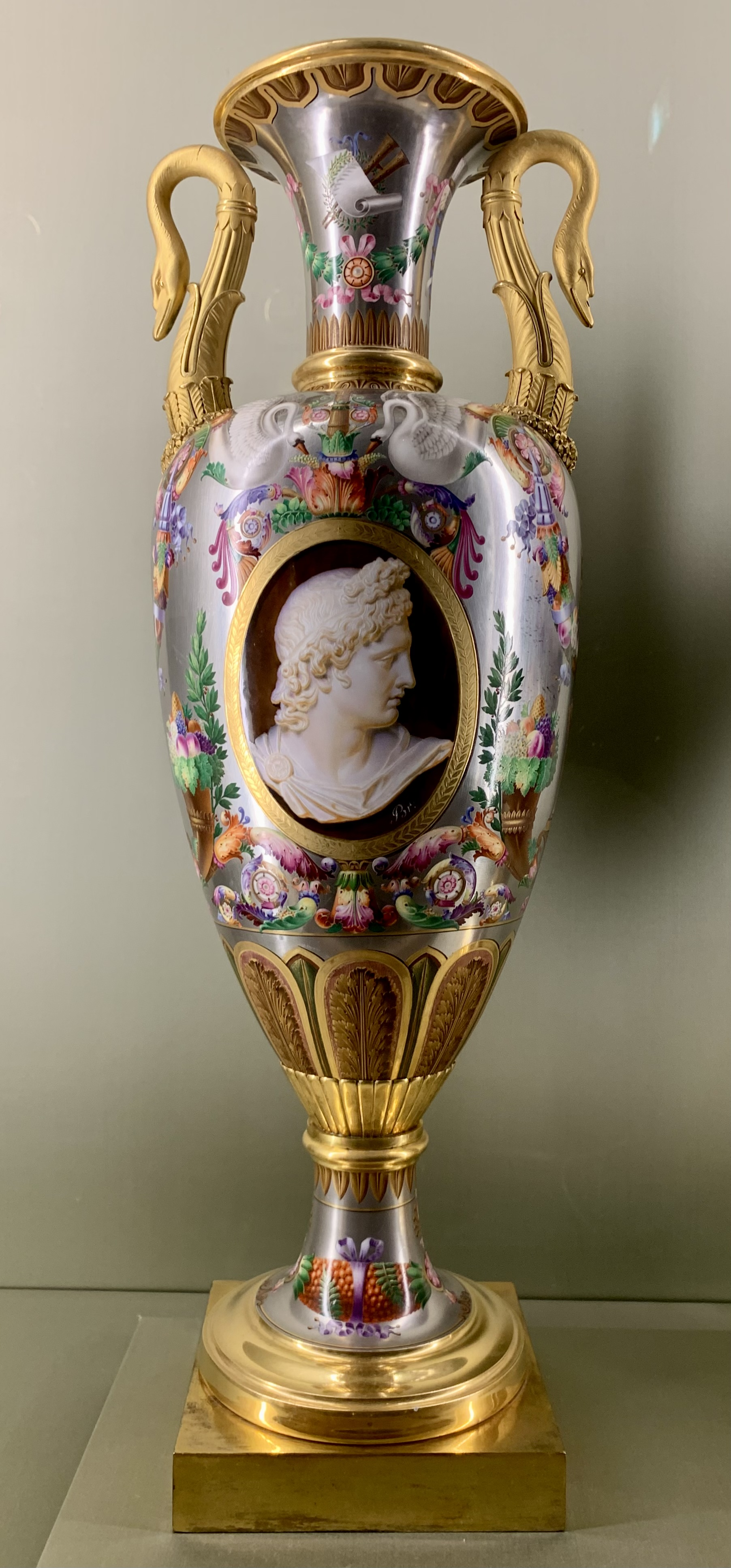
Empire style – Vase, by the Sèvres porcelain factory, 1814, hard-paste porcelain with platinum background and gilt bronze mounts, Louvre

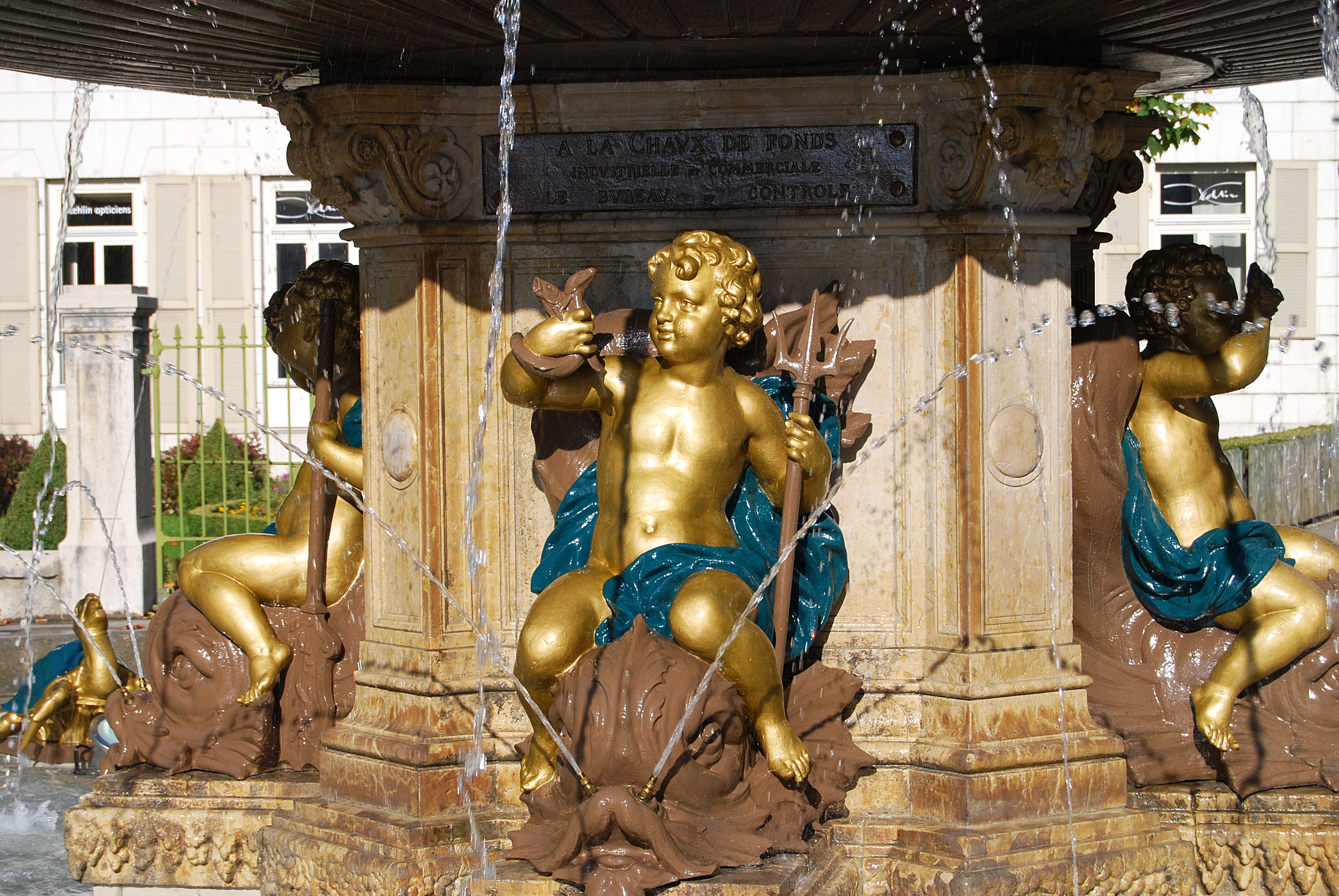
Neoclassical – Putto of the Grande Fontaine (Avenue Léopold-Robert), La Chaux-de-Fonds, Switzerland, by Maximilien Louis Bourgeois, 1888

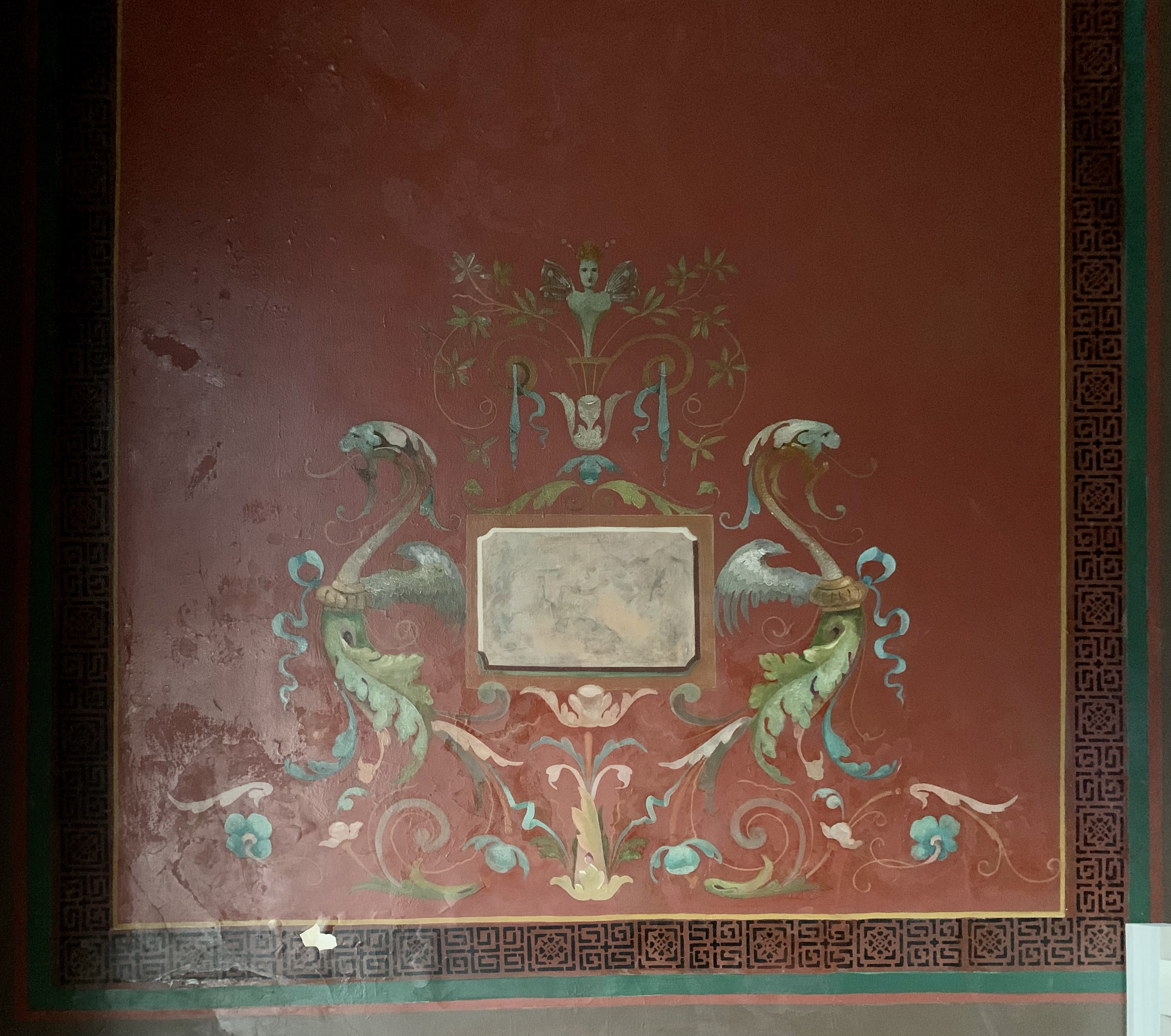
Neoclassical – Pompeian style wall in Strada Nicolae Filipescu no. 45, Bucharest, Romania, unknown architect or painter, c. 1890

Coffered ceiling with polychromy in front of the main entrance of the Academy of Athens, completed in 1885.

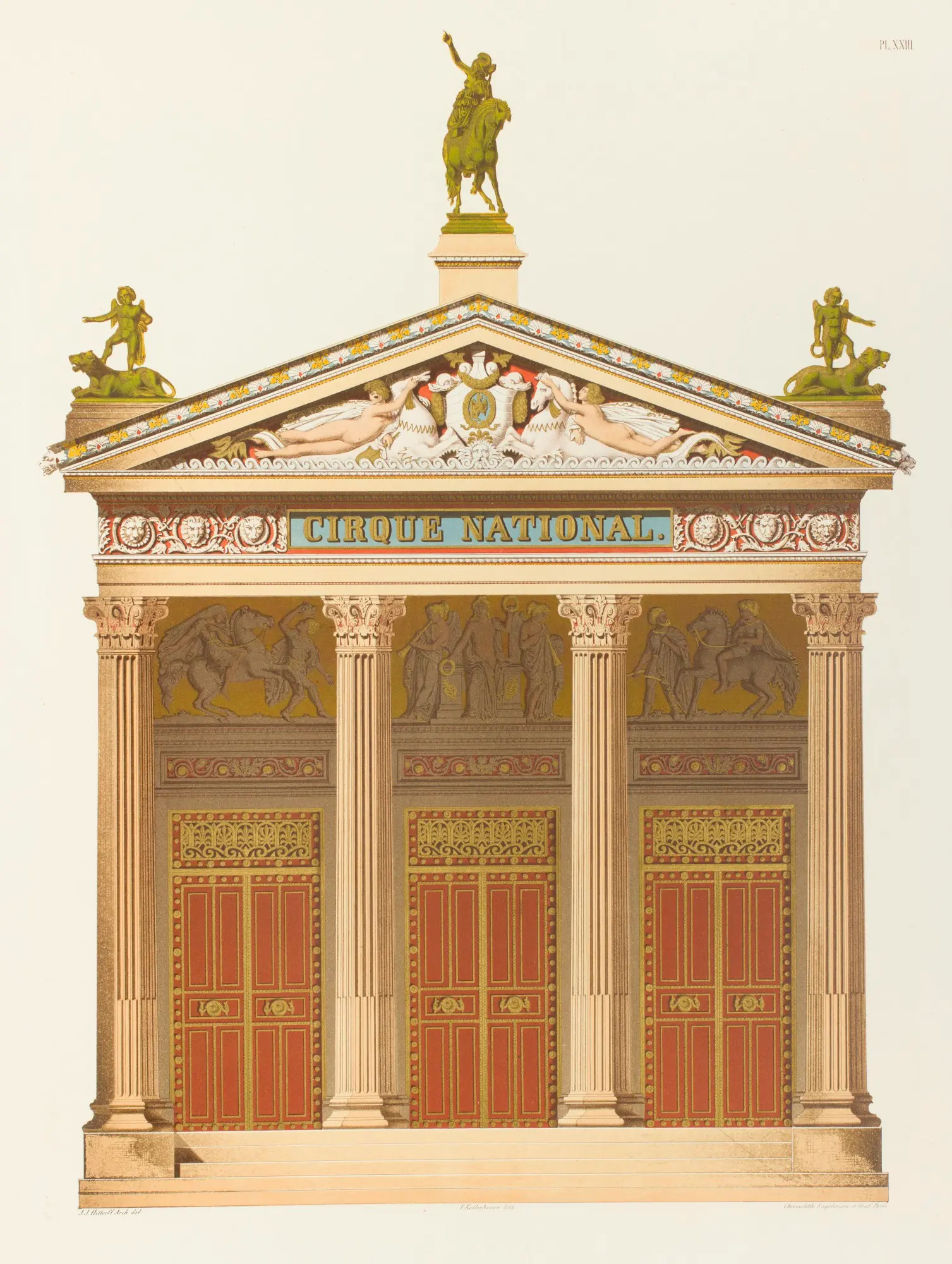
Neoclassical – Polychromatic façade of the Cirque Nationale, Paris, by Jakob Ignaz Hittorff, 1840

=== 19th century maximalism ===
"More is more" was the aesthetic principle followed in the Victorian era. Maximalism is present in many types of Victorian era designs, like ceramics, furniture, cutlery, tableware, fashion, architecture, book illustration, clocks, etc. Despite the appetite for ornamentation, many of them remain decorated with only a few colours, especially furniture. Ceramics were the field where polychrome was widespread. Besides objects, polychrome ceramic was also present in architecture and some furniture pieces and architecture through tiles.

The objects and buildings of the 19th century shown in the galleries of this page are without any doubt impressive. Today were are delighted by their ornaments, colours, and styles. However, up to the 1960s, with the rise of Postmodernism, when people started to question Modernism and began to appreciate things from the pre-Modern past, the verdict of Victorian designs wasn't good. During the early 20th century and even when they were made, some described the Victorian age as being one that has been providing us with some of the ugliest objects that have ever been made. Descriptions like 'aesthetic monstrosities' or 'ornamental abominations' were around at the time, and it only got worse. At the end of the 19th century, Marc-Louis Solon (1835–1913), a well established ceramic designer, who worked for Minton and Company, was not unusual in commenting that the period 'bears the stamp of an unmitigated bad taste'. As time passed, negative opinions only got worse. Pioneer Modern architects Adolf Loos and Le Corbusier felt that works like this were not simply bad, they were such an affront they should have been made illegal.

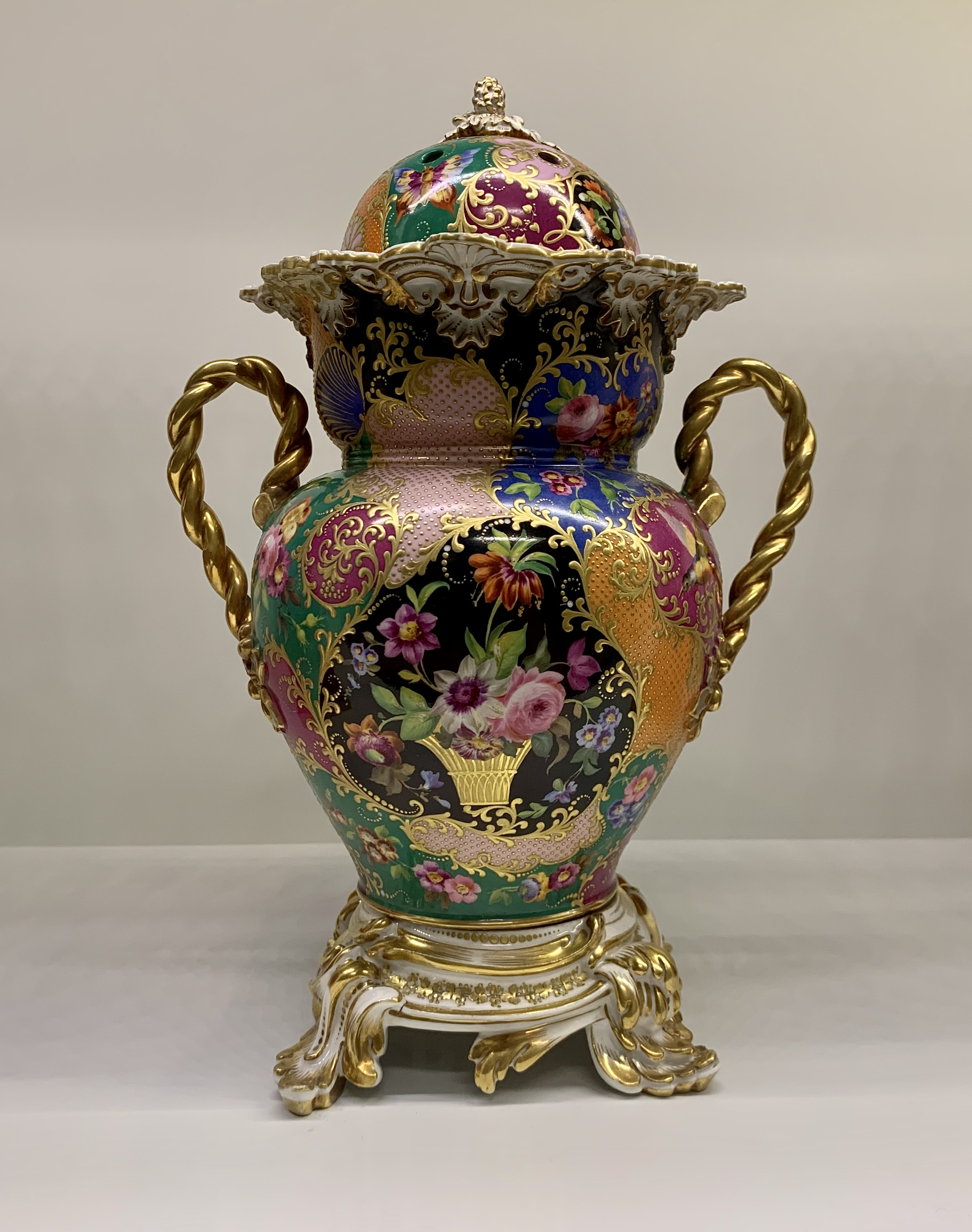
Rococo Revival incense burner (brûle-parfum), by Jacob Petit, c. 1834 – c. 1848, hard-paste porcelain, painted and gilded, Museum of Decorative Arts, Paris

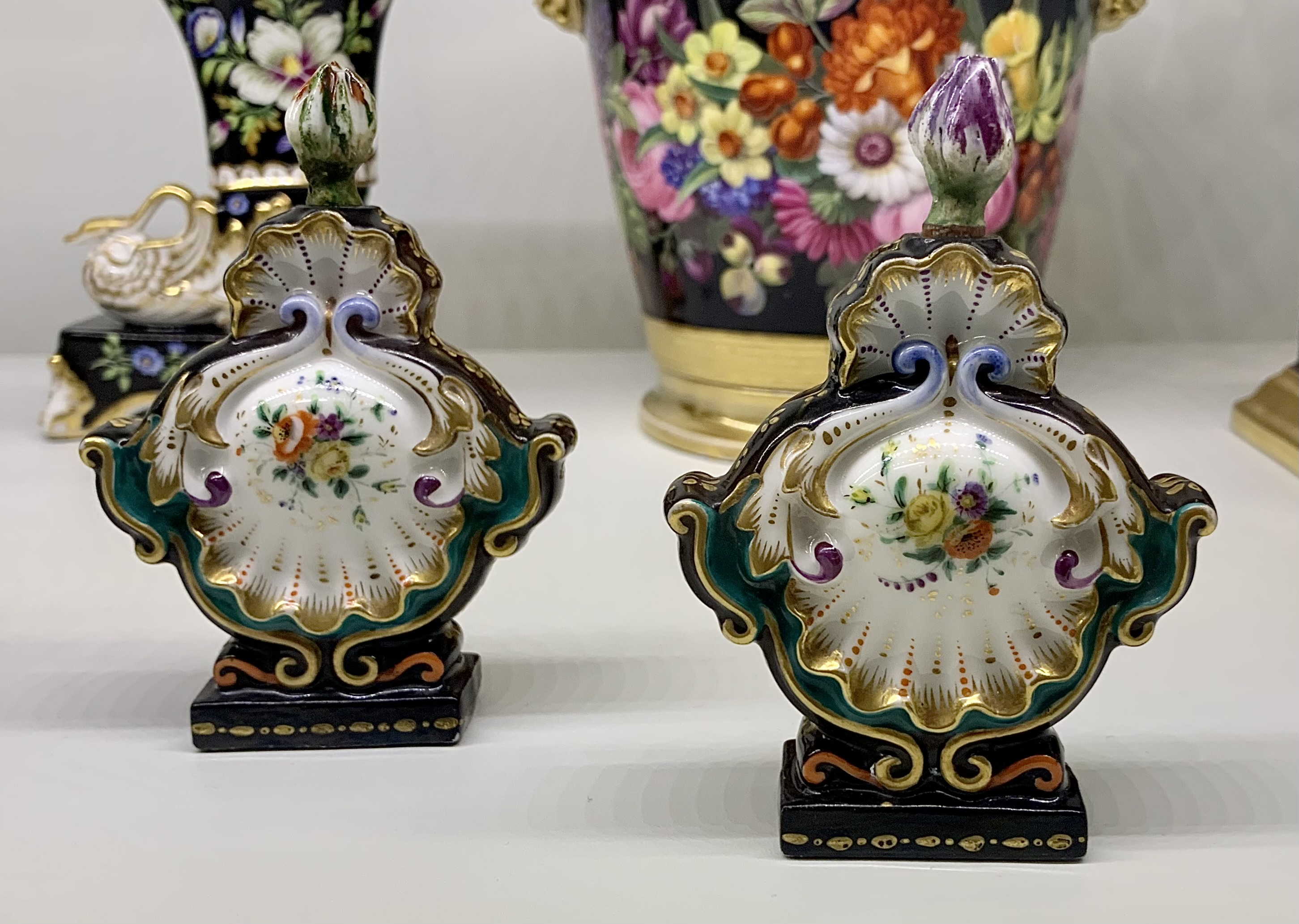
Rococo Revival pair of bottles, by Jacob Petit, c. 1840, hard-paste porcelain, painted and gilded, Museum of Decorative Arts, Paris

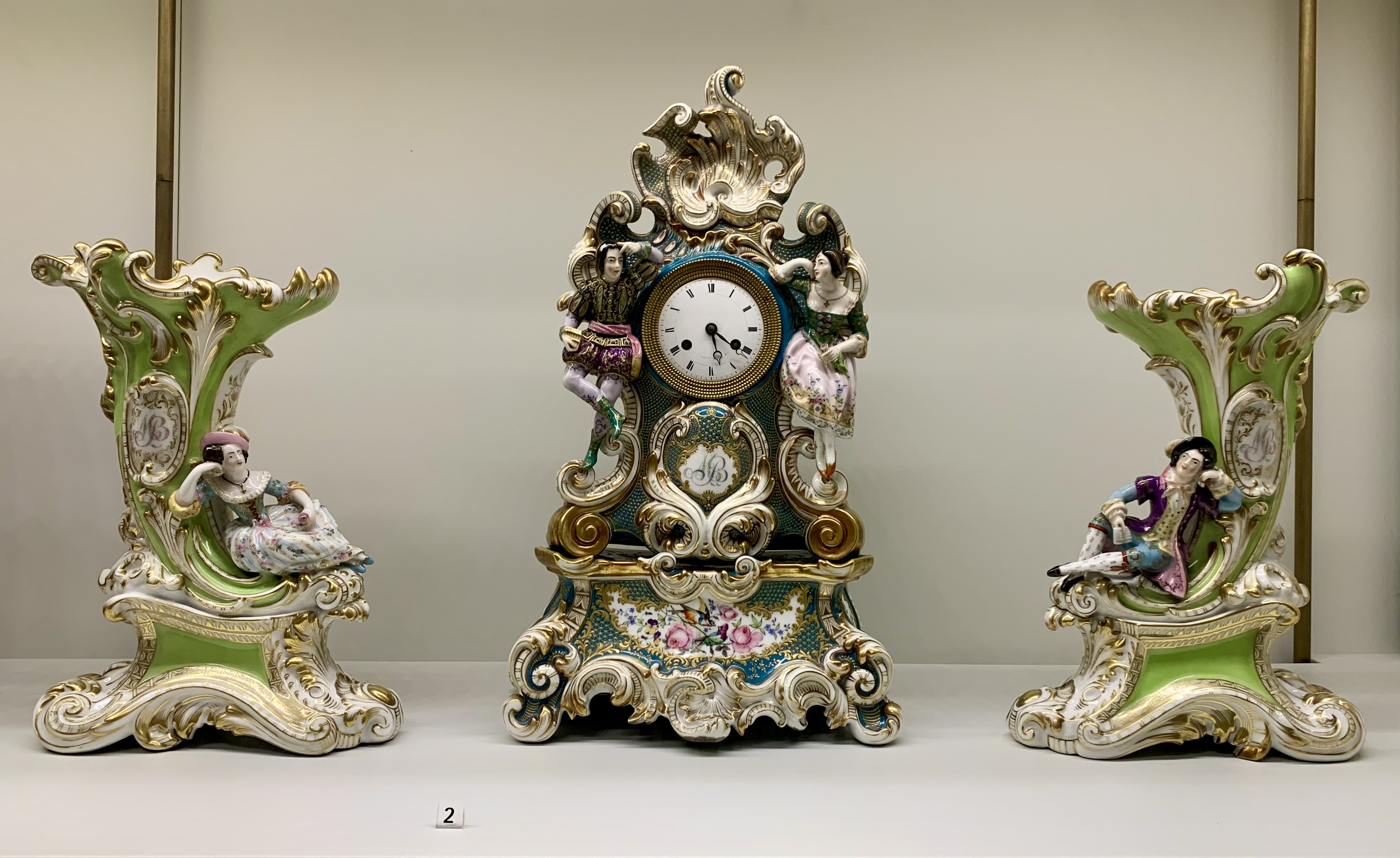
Rococo Revival pair of cone-shaped vases and a clock, by Nicolas Bugeard?, mid-19th century, hard-paste porcelain, painted and gilded, Museum of Decorative Arts, Paris

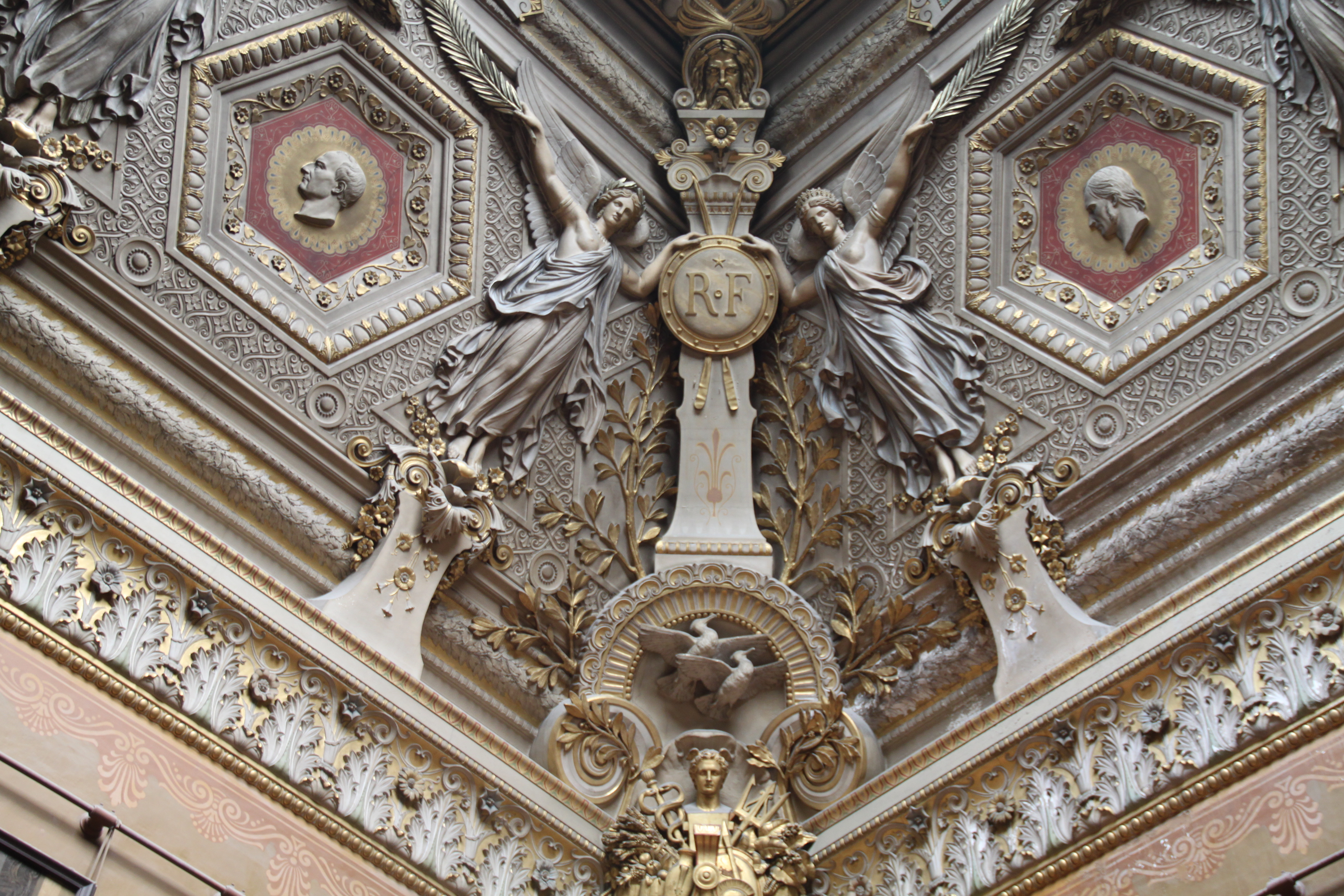
Neoclassical sculpted decoration on the ceiling of the Salon des Sept cheminées, Louvre Palace, Paris, by Francisque Duret, 1851

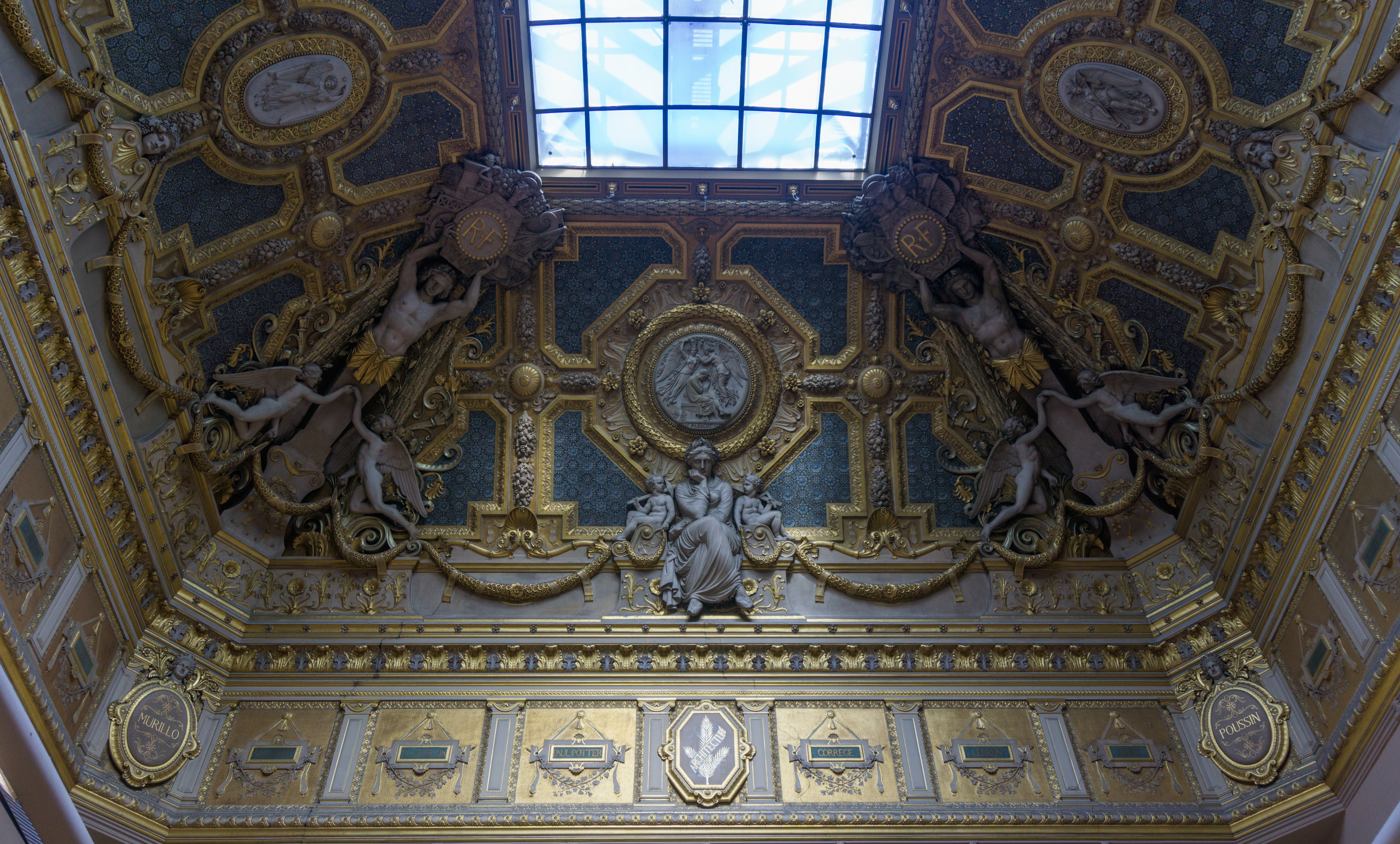
Neoclassical sculpted decoration on the ceiling of the Salon Carré, Louvre Palace, by Pierre-Charles Simart, 1851

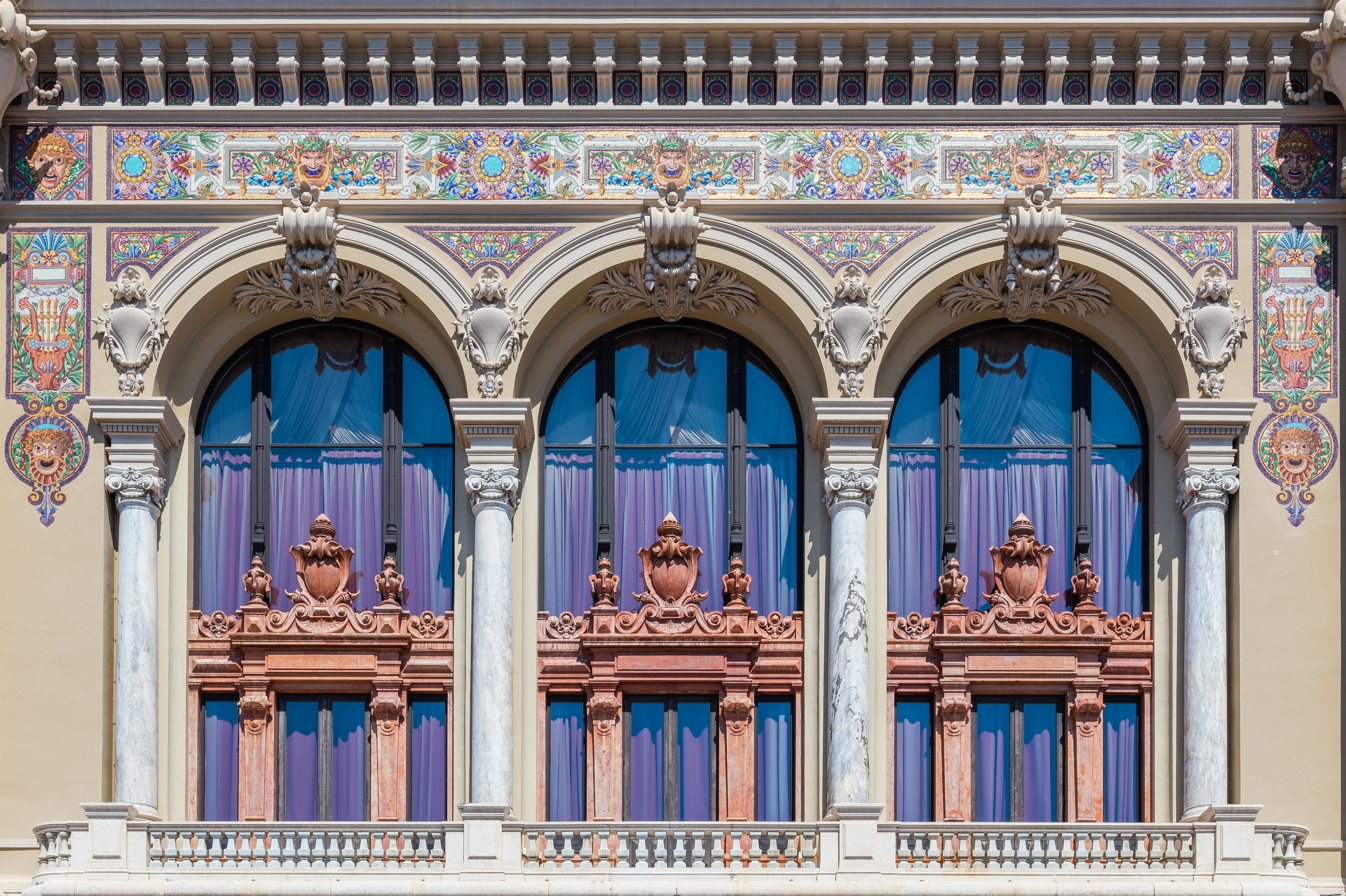
Beaux Arts mosaics on the Opéra de Monte-Carlo, Monaco, designed by Charles Garnier, 1879

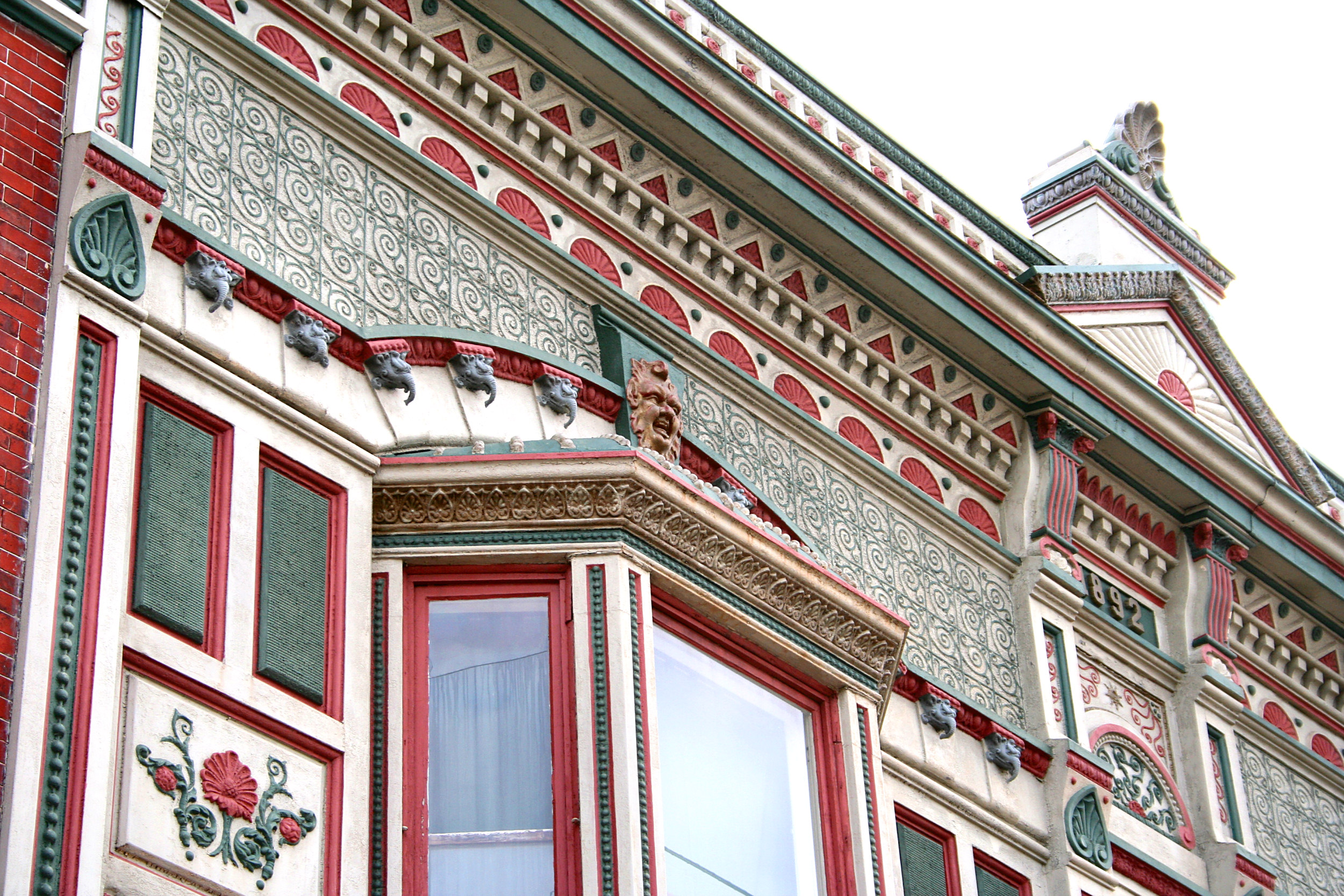
Polychrome architectural detail of an unidentified building in Kendallville, Indiana, US, unknown architect, 1892

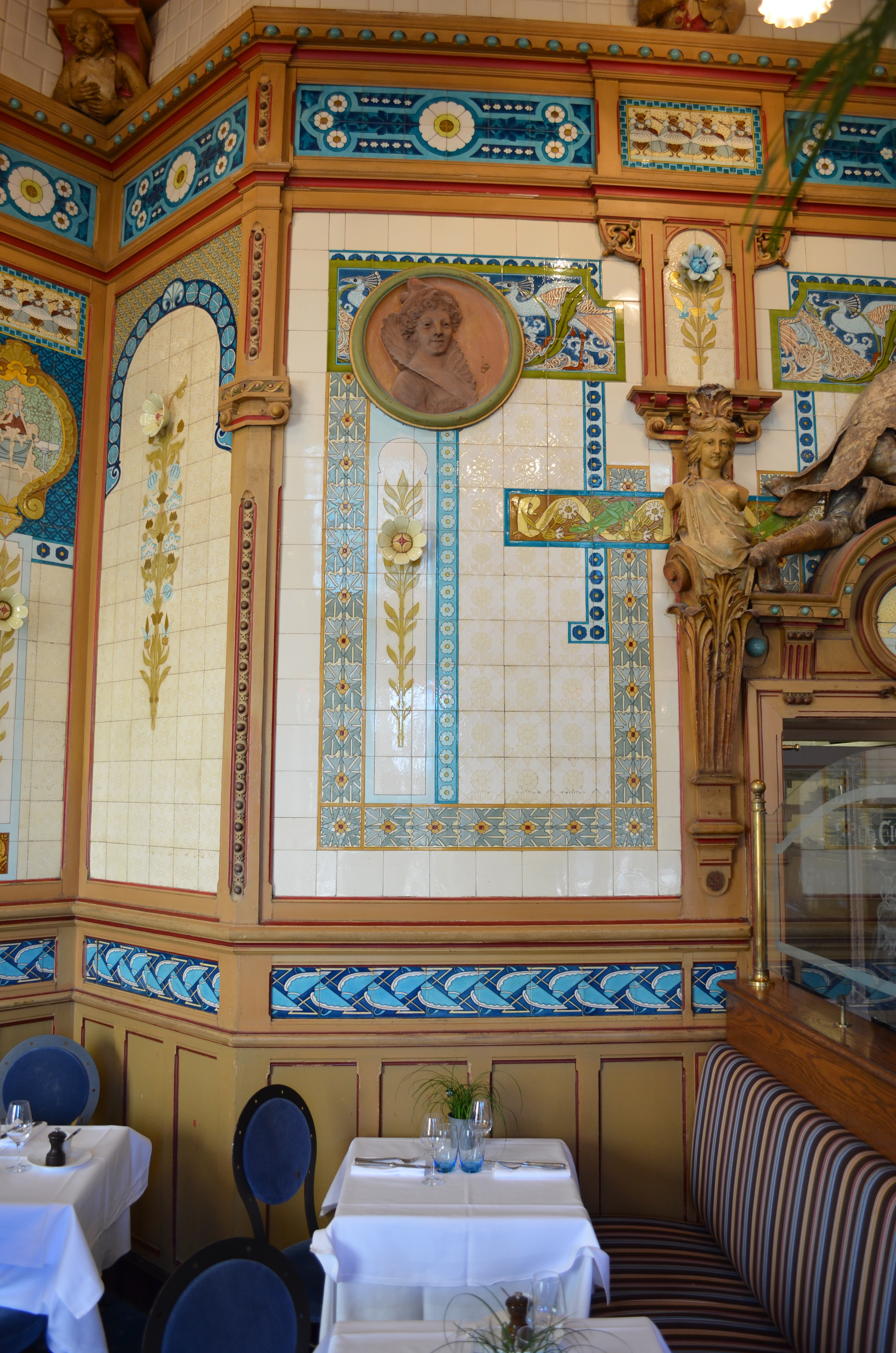
Interior of La Cigale, Nantes, France, designed by Émile Libaudière, and decorated with sculptures by Émile Gaucher and paintings by Georges Levreau, 1895

=== Polychrome brickwork ===
Polychrome brickwork is a style of architectural brickwork which emerged in the 1860s and used bricks of different colours (brown, cream, yellow, red, blue, and black) in patterned combinations to highlight architectural features. These patterns were made around window arches or were just applied on walls. It was often used to replicate the effect of quoining. Early examples featured banding, with later examples exhibiting complex diagonal, criss-cross, and step patterns, in some cases even writing using bricks. Elements of glazed ceramic with details were also used for more complex ornaments.

Interior of All Saints, Margaret Street, London, 1850–1859, by William Butterfield

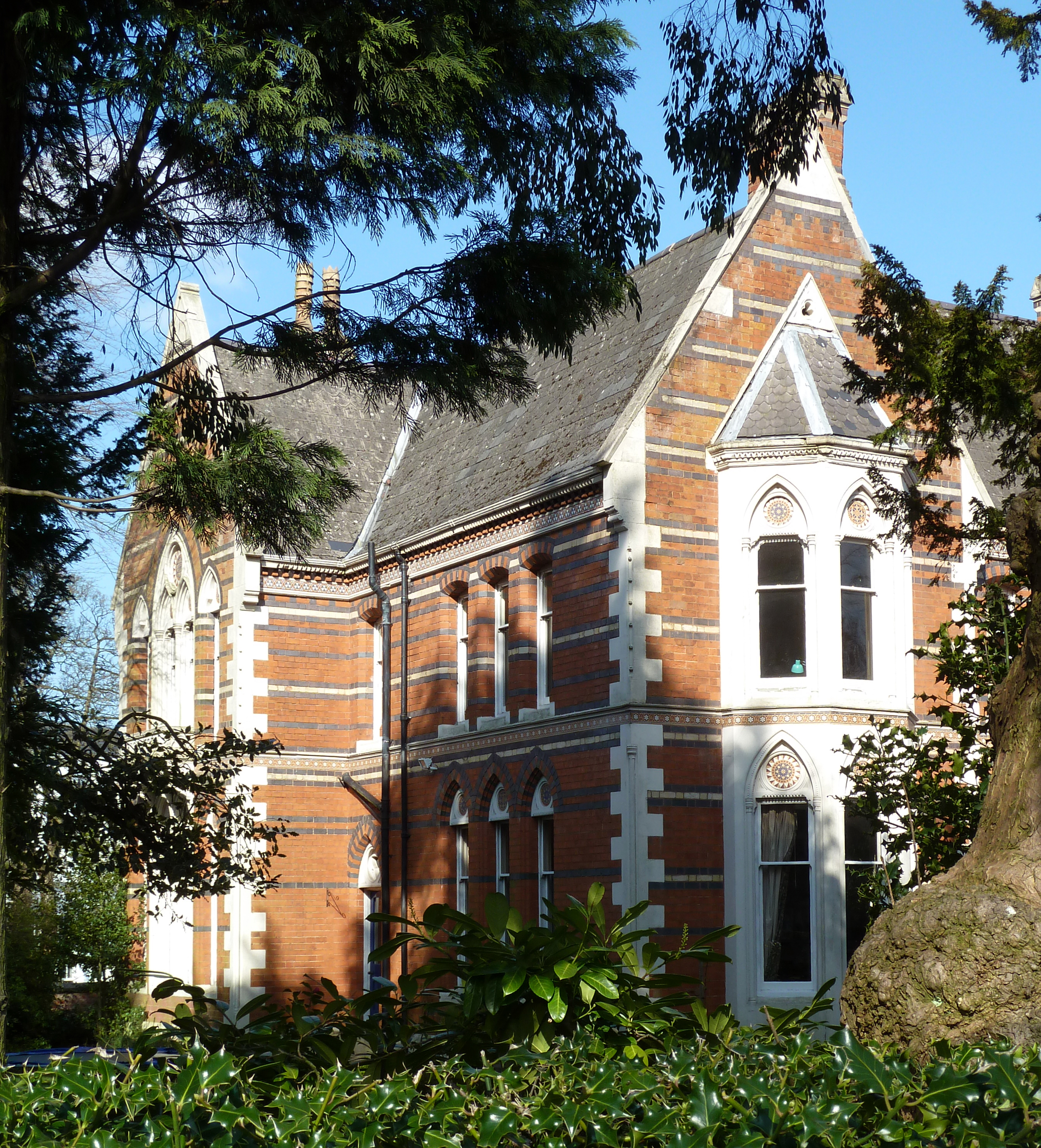
Ampton Road no. 12, Edgbaston, Birmingham, the UK, by John Henry Chamberlain, 1855

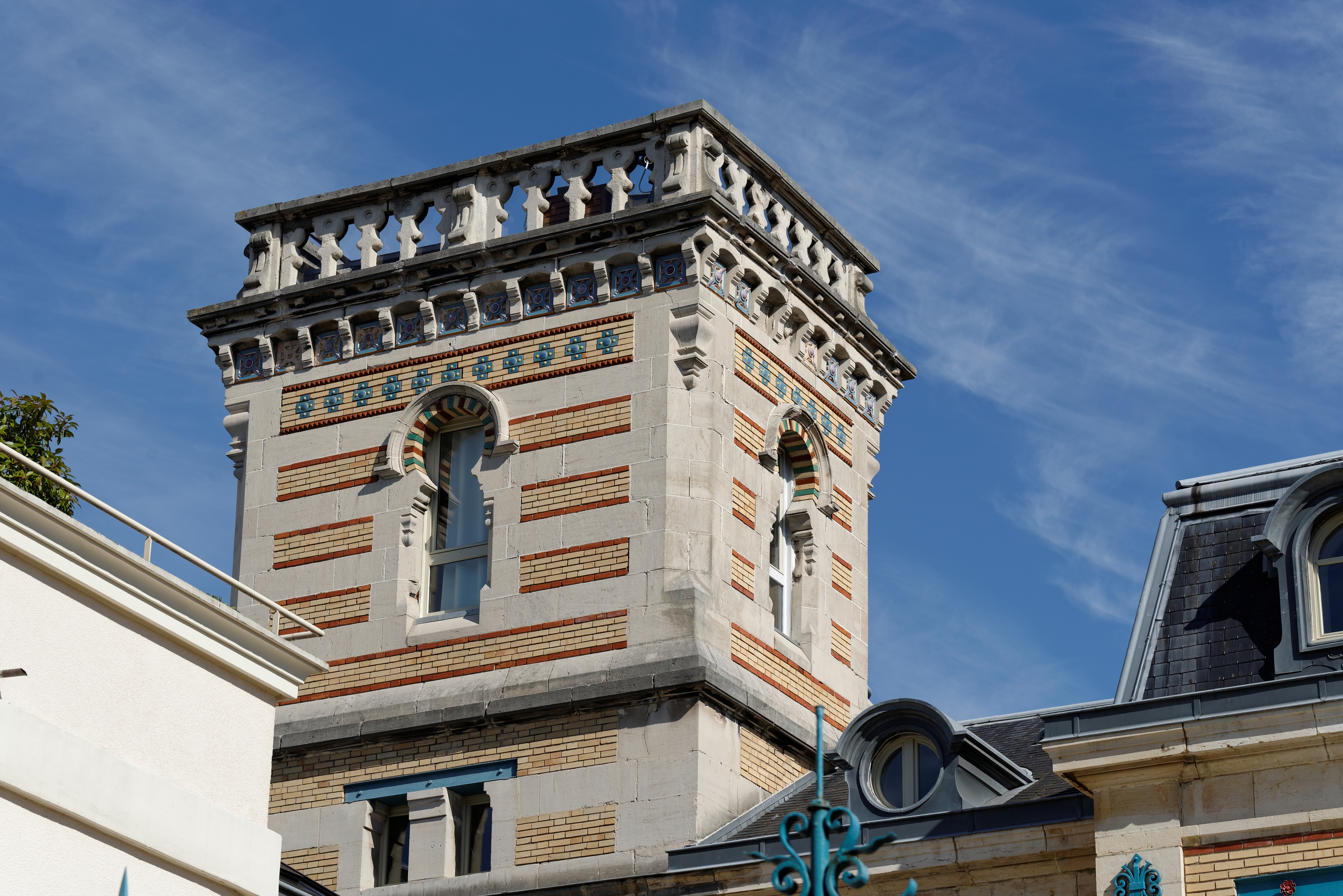
Detail of the Pernot Biscuit Factory (Rue Courtepée no. 10–18), Dijon, France, 1879

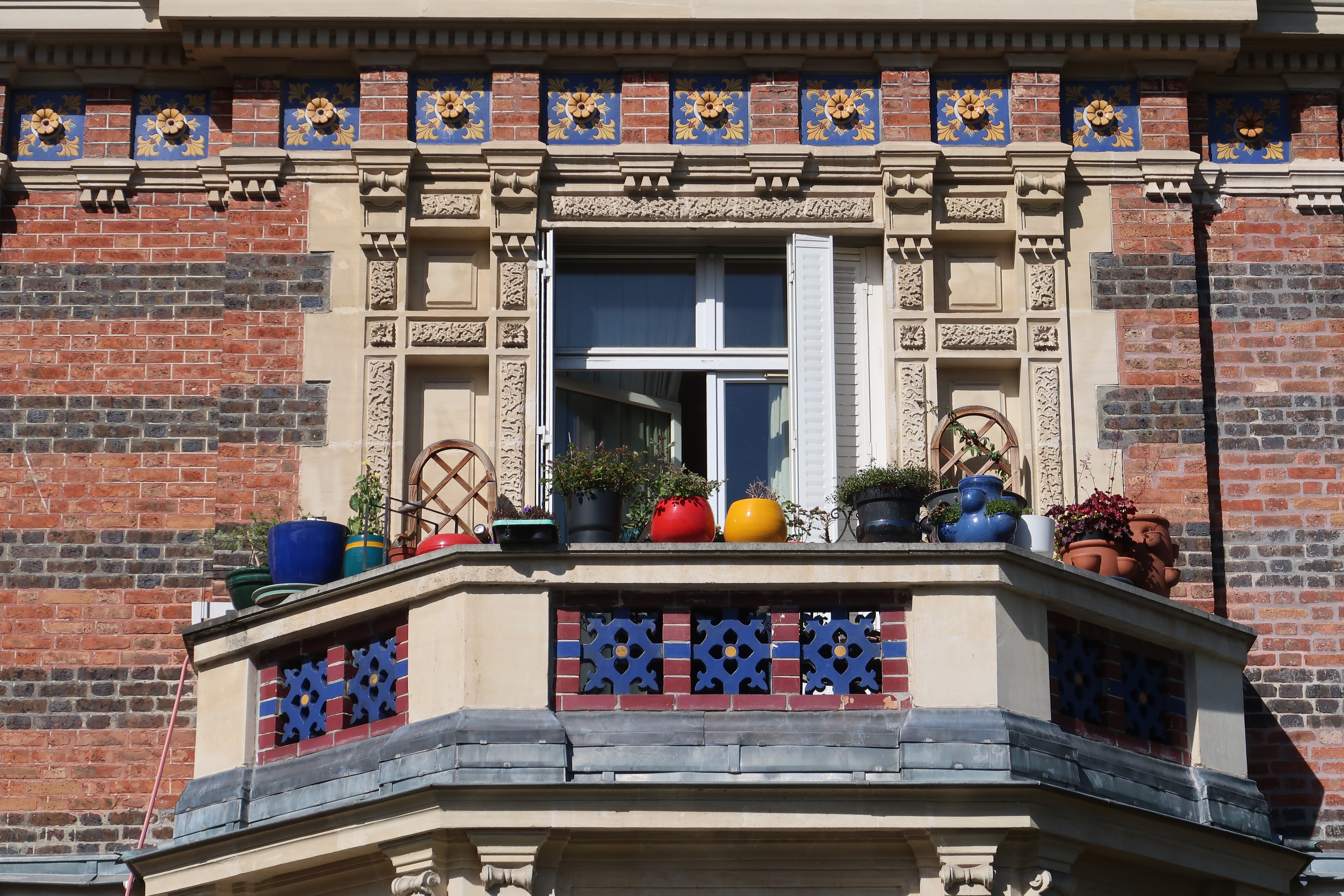
Facade of the (now) Suriname Embassy (Rue du Ranelagh no. 94), Paris, unknown architect, 1885

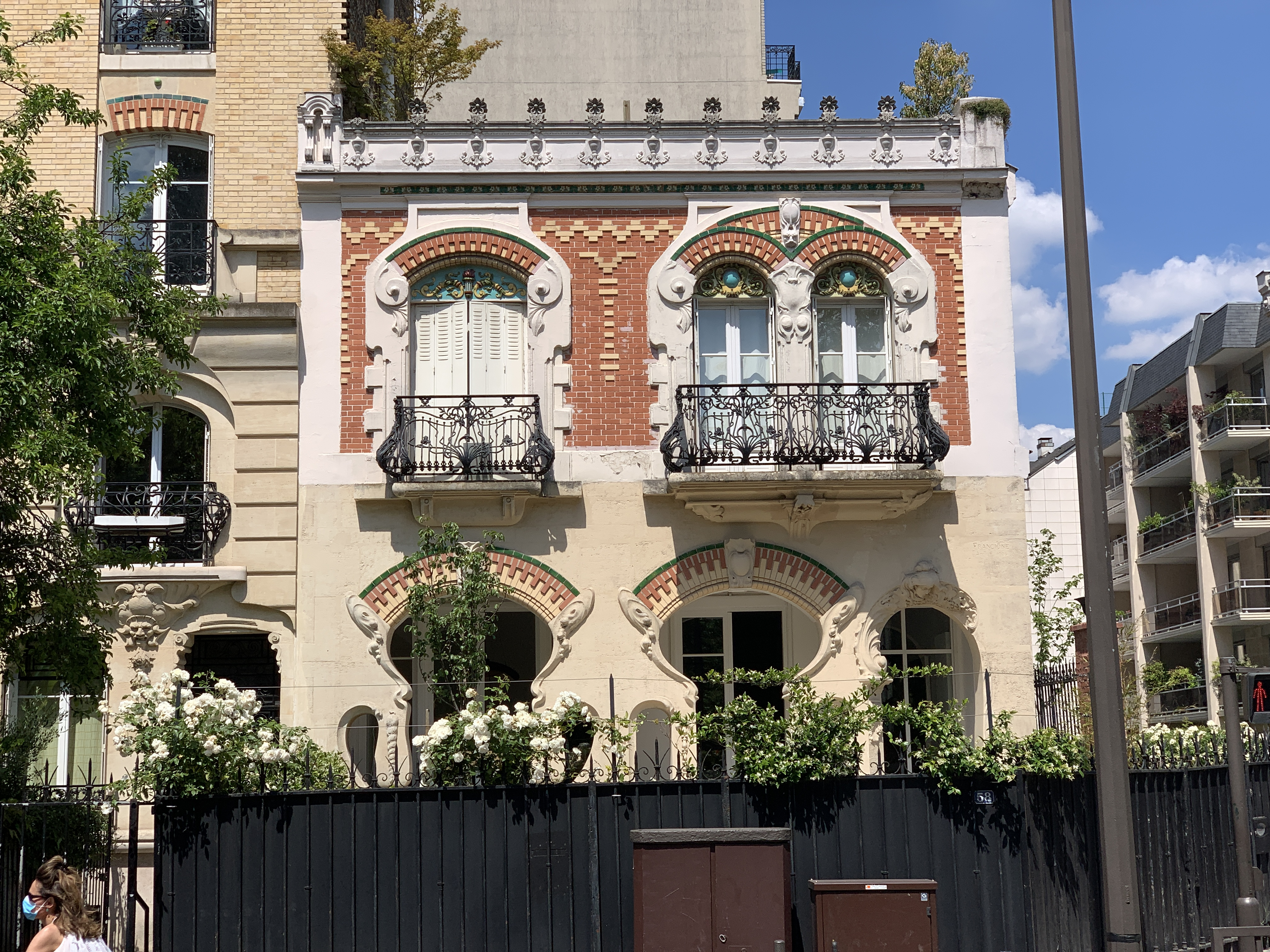
Avenue des Minimes no. 58, Vincennes, France, by Victor Francione, 1905

=== Romanian Revival style ===
In the Kingdom of Romania, the Romanian Revival style appeared at the end of the 19th century. It is the Romanian equivalent of the National Romantic style that was popular at the same time in Northern Europe. The movement is heavily inspired by Brâncovenesc architecture, a style that was popular in Wallachia in the late 17th and early 18th centuries. Interiors of houses in this style built before WW1 are often decorated with a variety of bright colours. In the case of a few buildings, the polychrome extends on the exterior too, through the use of colorful glazed ceramic tiles. The style became more popular in the 20th century. A Romanian Revival house that stands out through its variety of colours is the Gheorghe Petrașcu House (Piața Romană no. 5) in Bucharest, by Spiru Cegăneanu, 1912

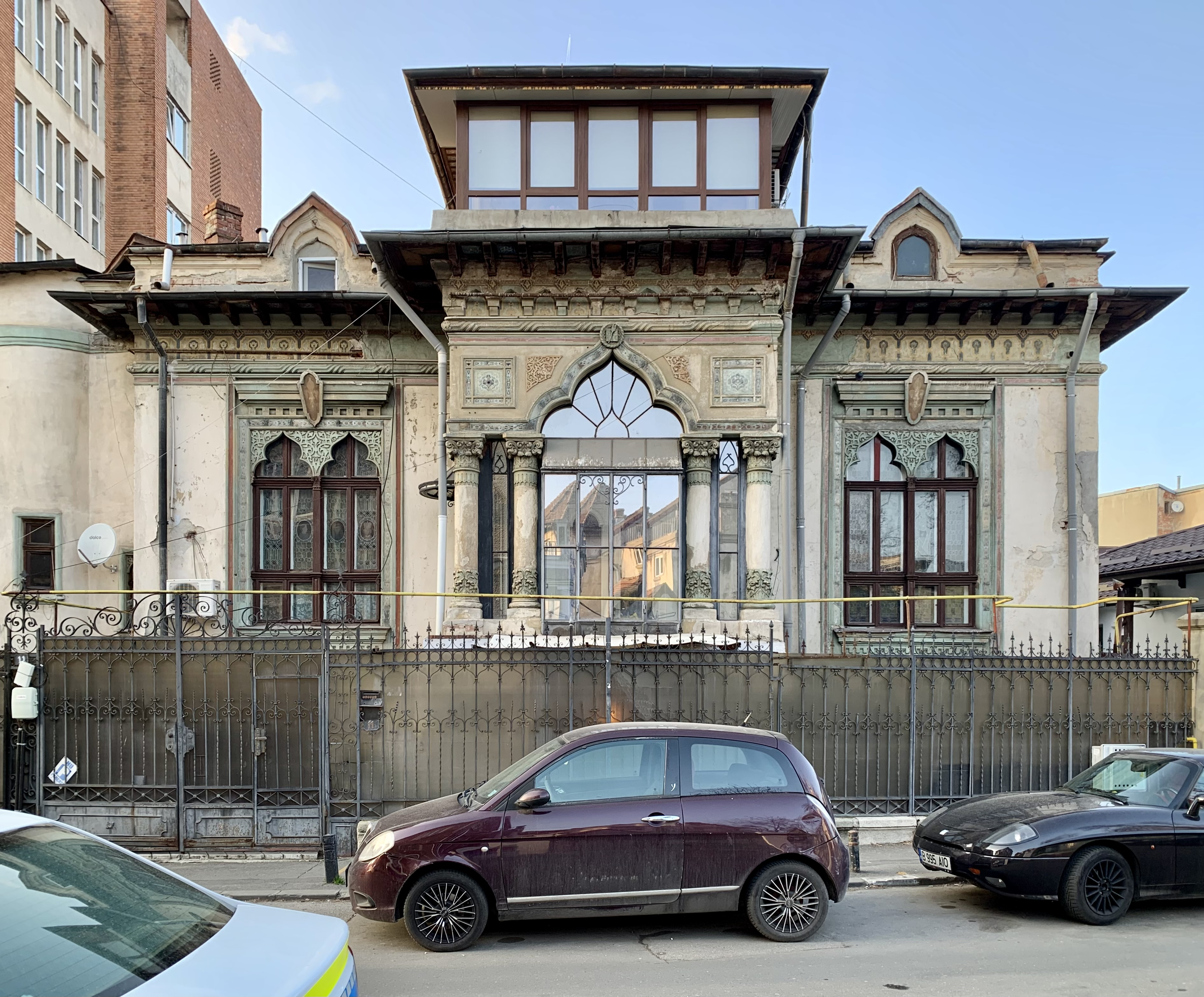
Gheorghe Ionescu-Gion House (Strada Logofătul Udriște no. 11), Bucharest, Romania, by Ion N. Socolescu, 1889

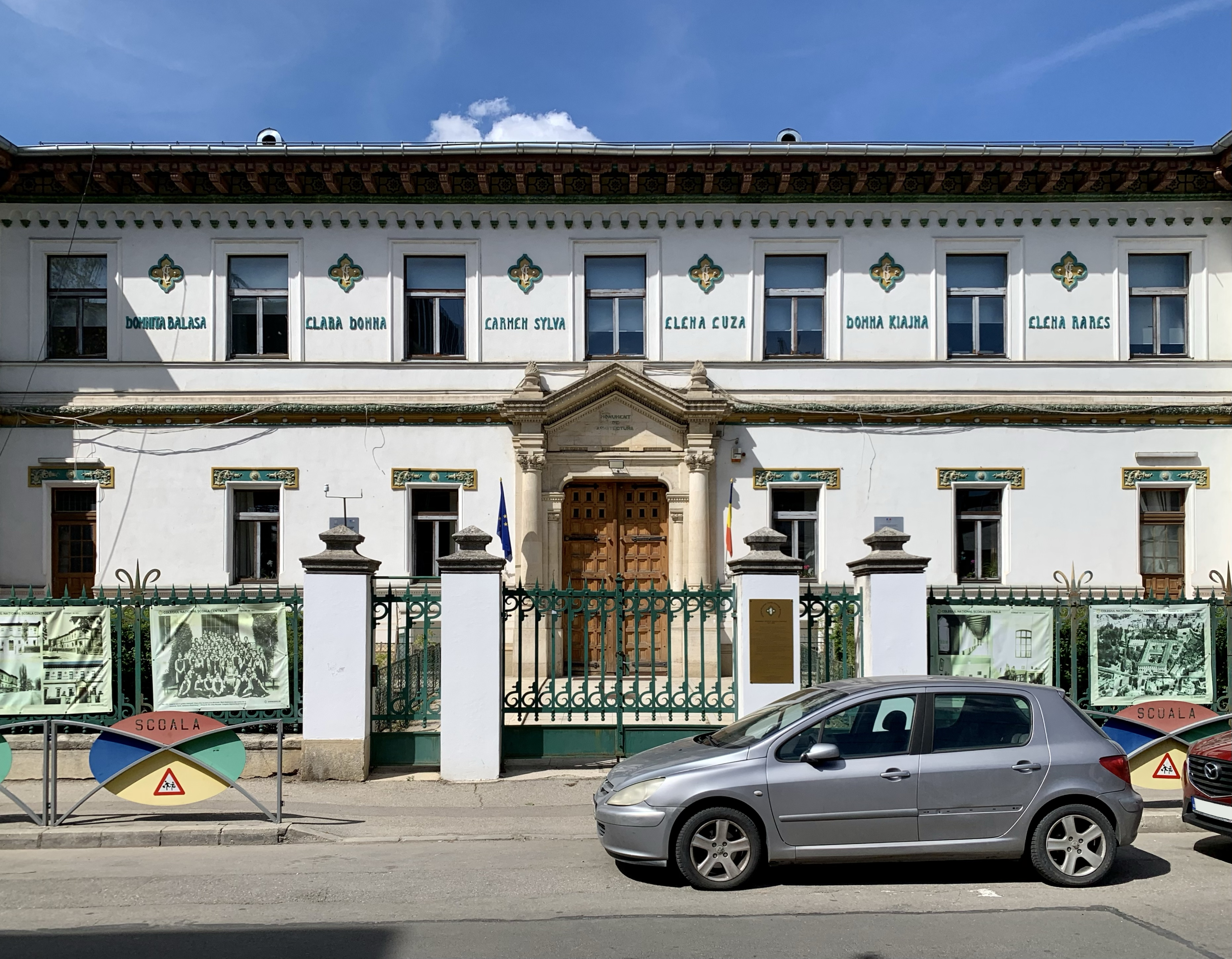
Central Girls' School, Bucharest, by Ion Mincu, 1890

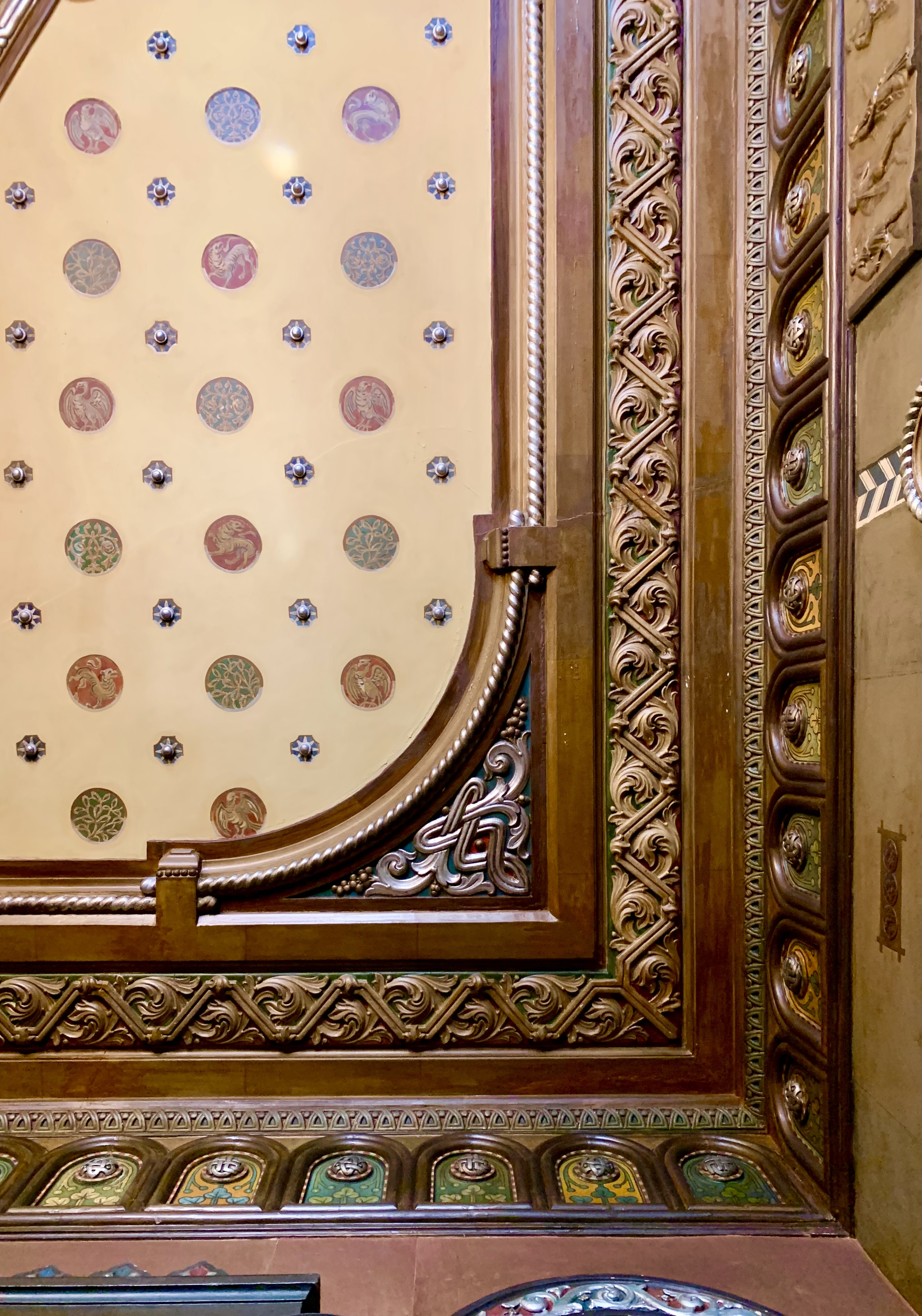
Ceiling of the Gheorghe Petrașcu House (Piața Romană no. 5), Bucharest, by Spiru Cegăneanu, 1912

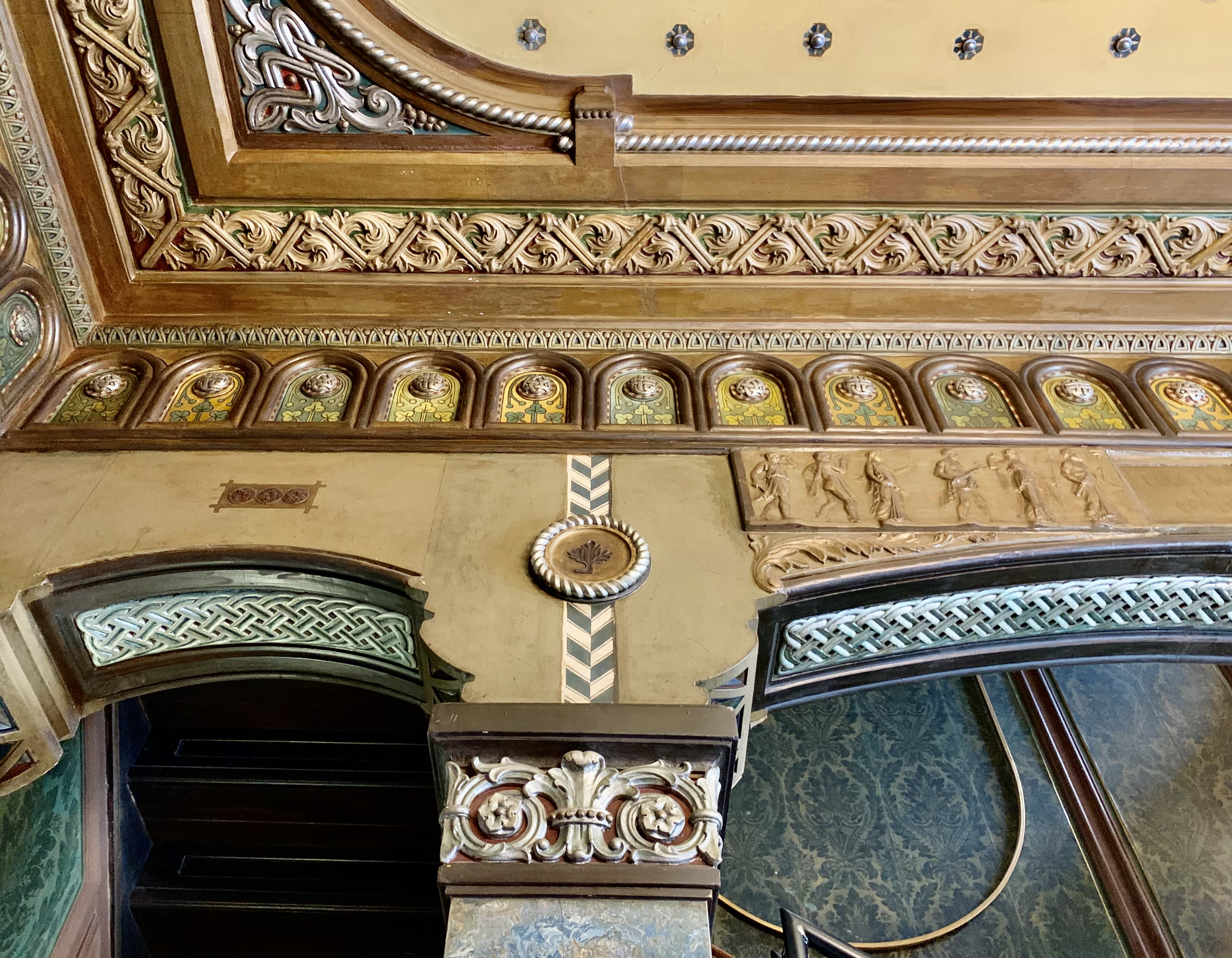
Ceiling of the Gheorghe Petrașcu House, Bucharest, by Spiru Cegăneanu, 1912

== 20th century ==
In the twentieth century there were notable periods of polychromy in architecture, from the expressions of Art Nouveau throughout Europe, to the international flourishing of Art Deco or Art Moderne, to the development of postmodernism in the latter decades of the century. During these periods, brickwork, stone, tile, stucco, and metal facades were designed with a focus on the use of new colors and patterns, while architects often looked for inspiration to historical examples ranging from Islamic tilework to English Victorian brick.

=== Before World War I ===
At the beginning of the 20th century, before the world wars, Revivalism (including Neoclassicism and the Gothic Revival) and eclecticism of historic styles were very popular in design and architecture. Many of the things said about the 19th century are still in this period. Many of the buildings from this period have their interiors decorated with colours, through tiles, mosaics, stuccos, or murals. When it comes to exteriors, most polychrome facades are decorated with ceramic tiles.

Art Nouveau was also in fashion during the 1900s all over the Western world. However, it fragmented by 1911 and from then it steadily faded, until it disappeared with WW1. Some regular Art Nouveau buildings have their facades decorated with colourful glazed ceramic ornaments. The colours used are often more earthy and faded compared to the intense ones used by Neoclassicism. Compared to other movements in design and architecture, Art Nouveau was one with different versions in multiple countries. The Belgian and French form is characterized by organic shapes, ornaments taken from the plant world, sinuous lines, asymmetry (especially when it comes to objects design), the whiplash motif, the femme fatale, and other elements of nature. In Austria, Germany and the UK, it took a more stylized geometric form, as a form of protest towards revivalism and eclecticism. The geometric ornaments found in Gustav Klimt's paintings and in the furniture of Koloman Moser are representative of the Vienna Secession (Austrian Art Nouveau). In some countries, artists found inspiration in national tradition and folklore. In the UK for example, multiple silversmiths used interlaces taken from Celtic art. Similarly, Hungarian, Russian, and Ukrainian architects used polychromatic folkloric motifs on their buildings, usually through colourful ceramic ornaments.

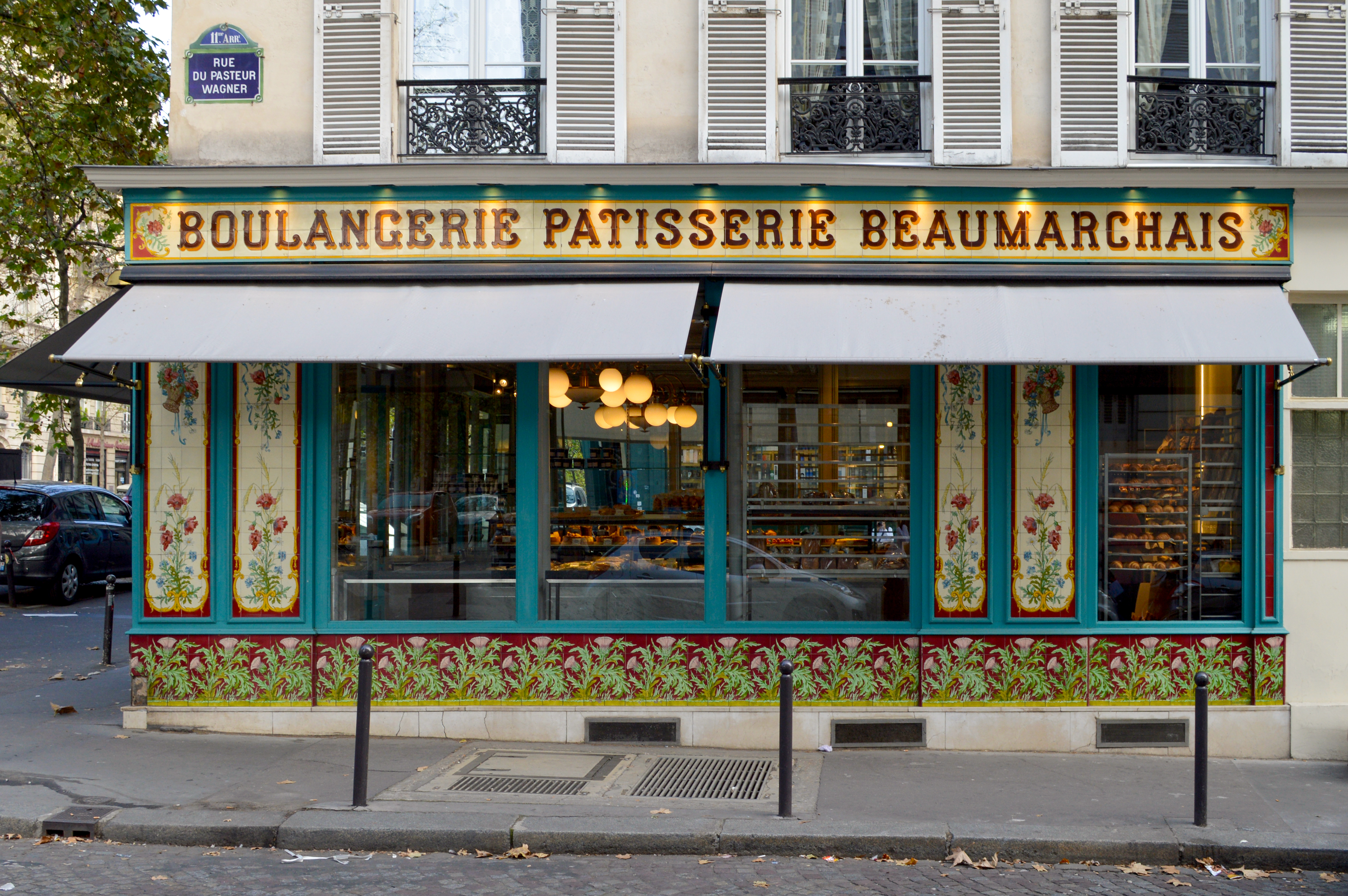
Rococo Revival – Boulangerie (Boulevard Beaumarchais no. 28), Paris, 1900, by Benoit et fils

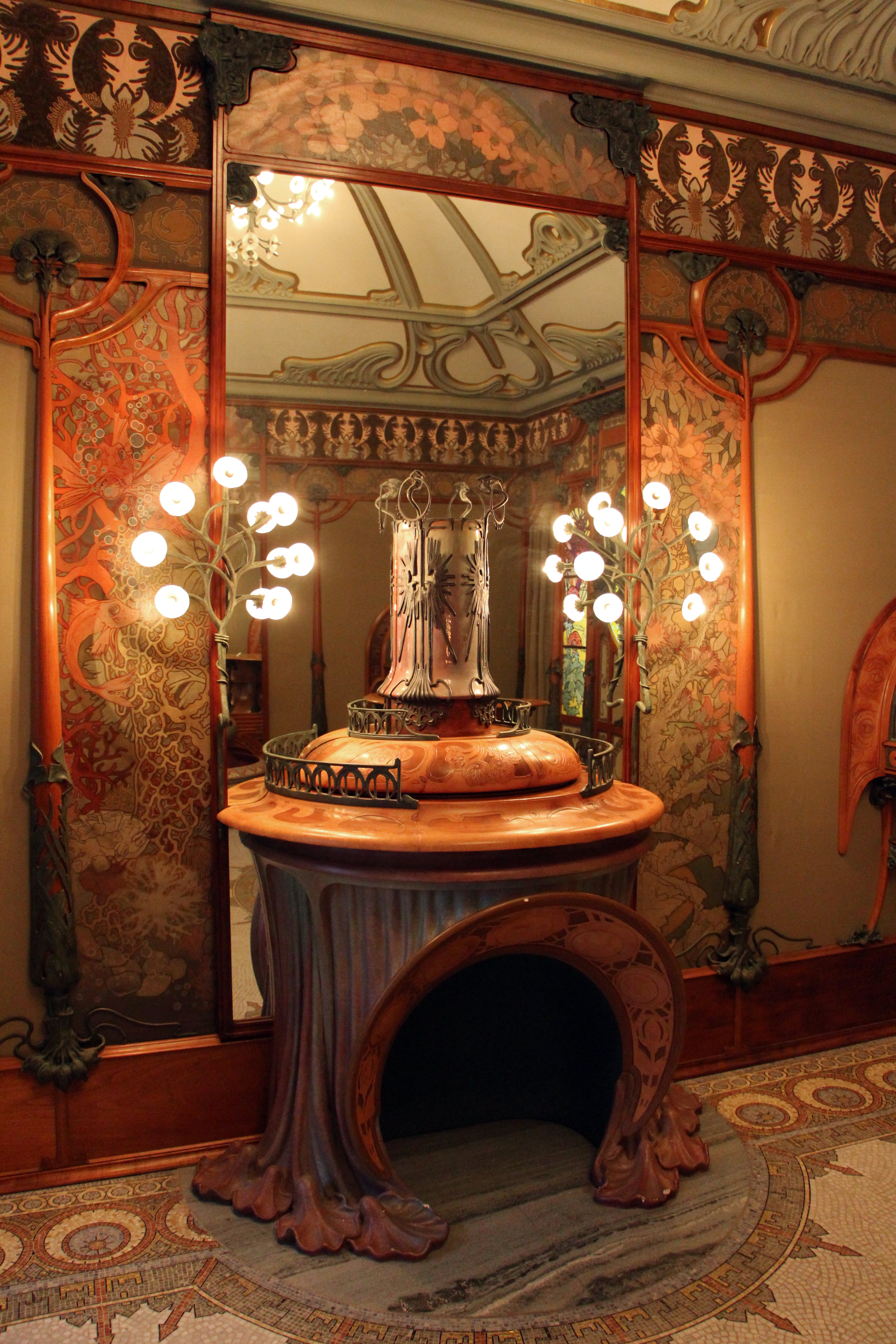
French Art Nouveau – Bijouterie Fouquet, Musée Carnavalet, Paris, by Alphonse Mucha, c. 1900

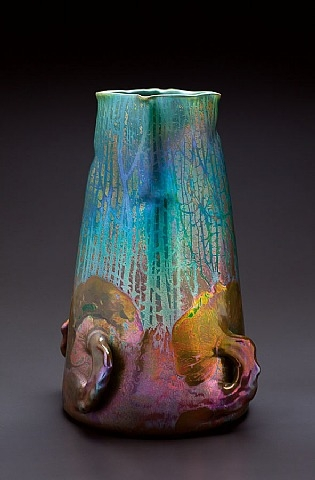
French Art Nouveau – Vase, by Clément Massier, c. 1900, lusterware, Jason Jacques Gallery, New York

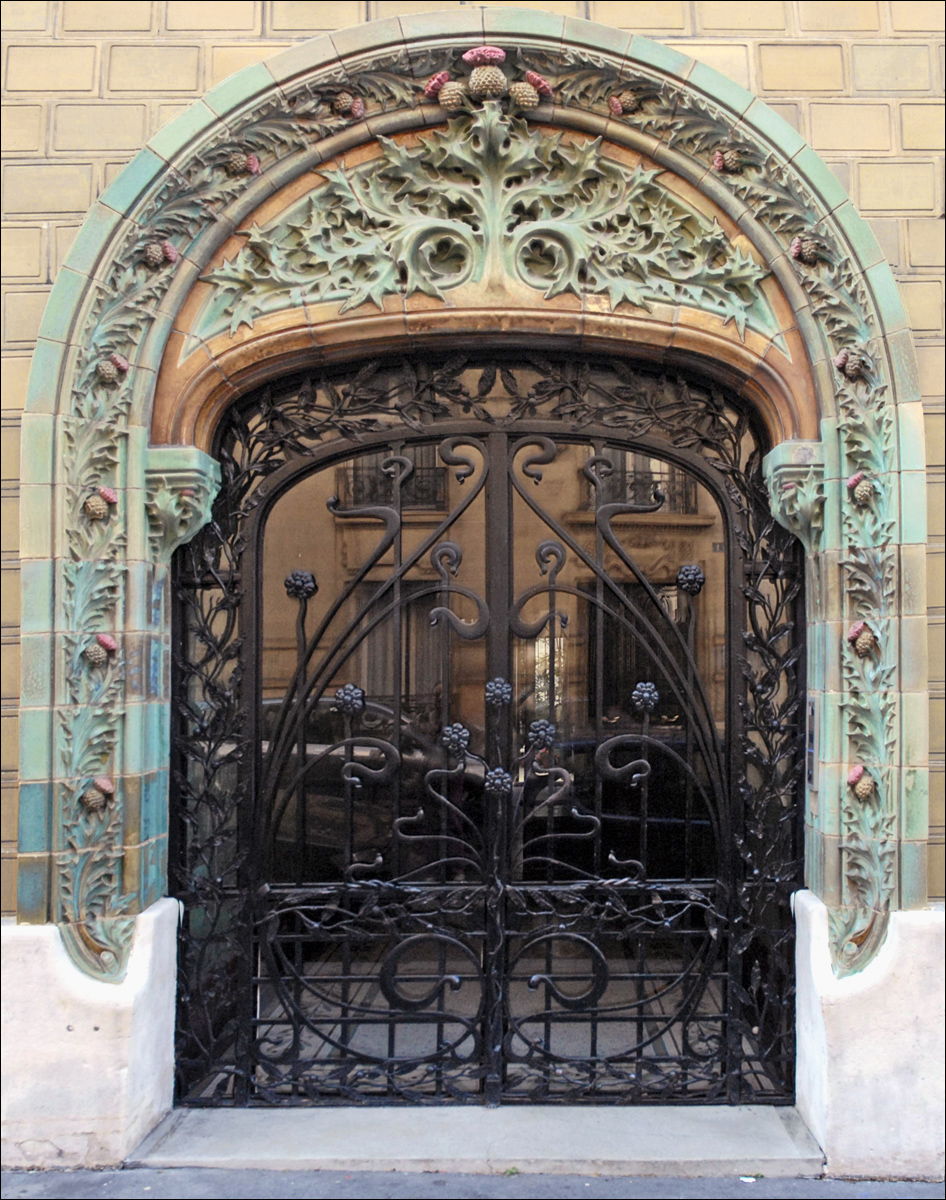
French Art Nouveau – Entrance decorated with glazed tiles of the Les Chardons Building (Rue Eugène-Manuel no. 2), Paris, 1903, by Charles Klein

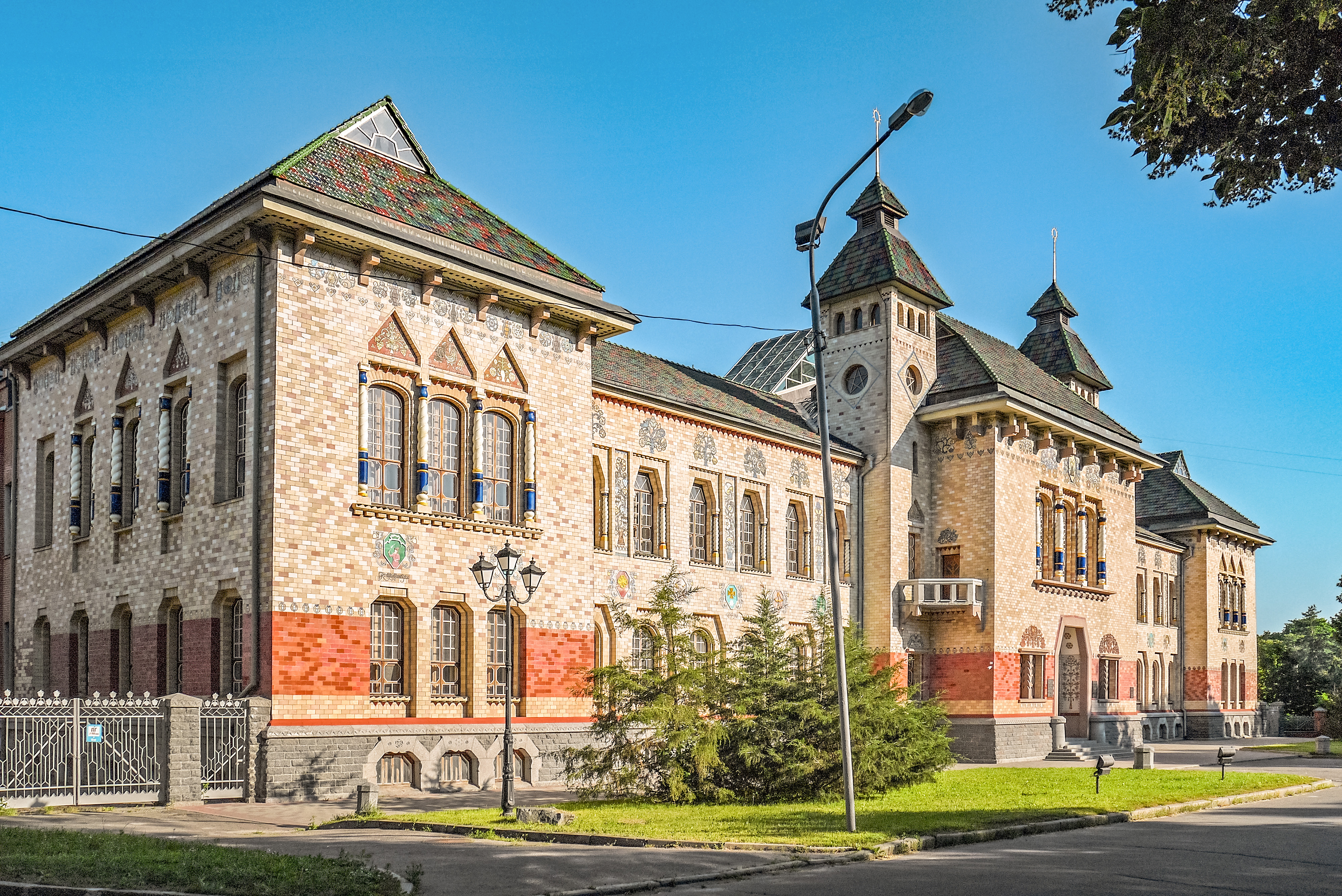
Ukrainian Art Nouveau – Poltava Reginal Administrative Building, Poltava, Ukraine, by Vasyl Krychevsky, 1903–1907

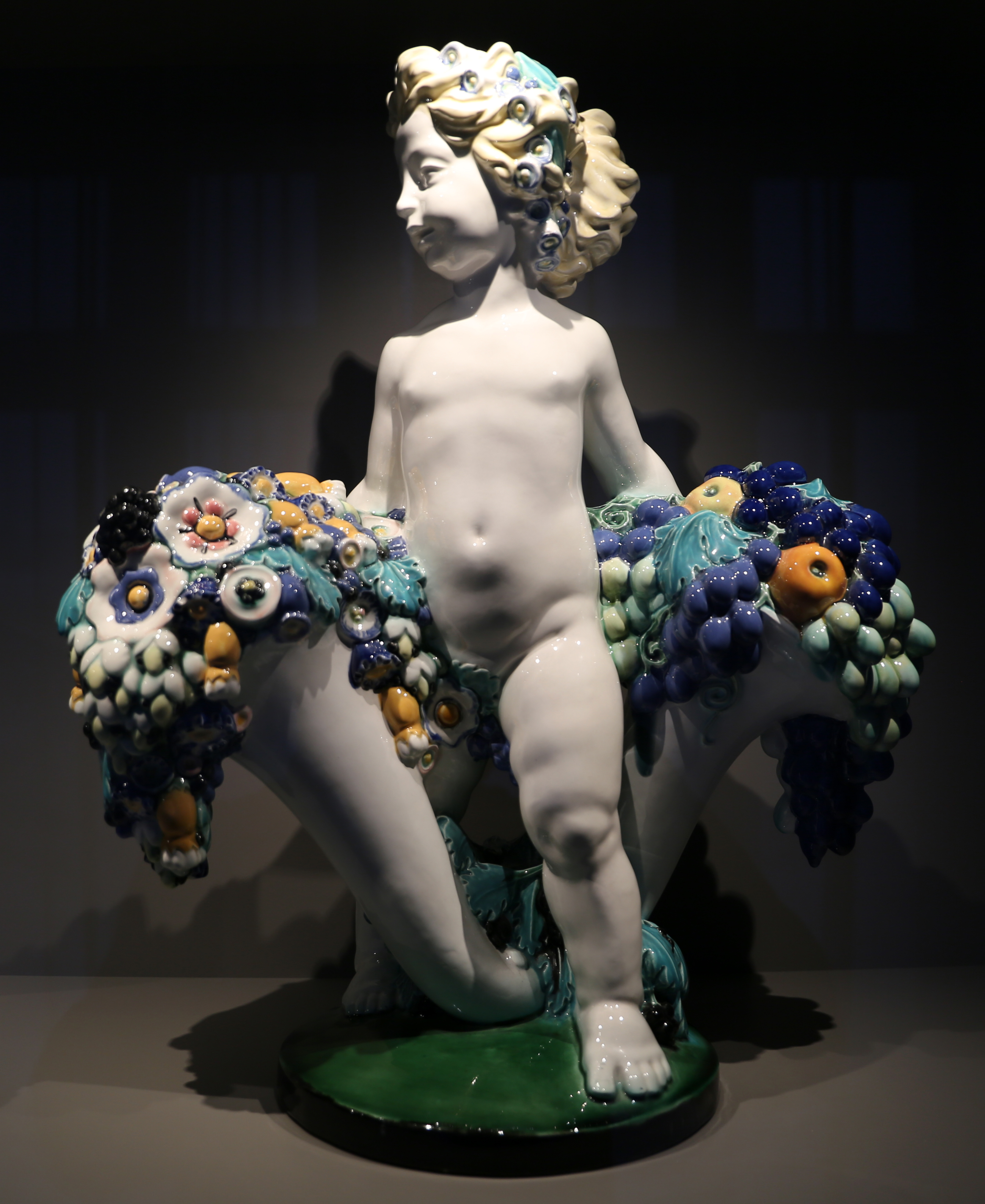
Austrian Art Nouveau – Putto with two cornucopias with floral cascades, by Michael Powolny, designed in c. 1907, produced in 1912, ceramic, Kunstgewerbemuseum Berlin, Berlin, Germany

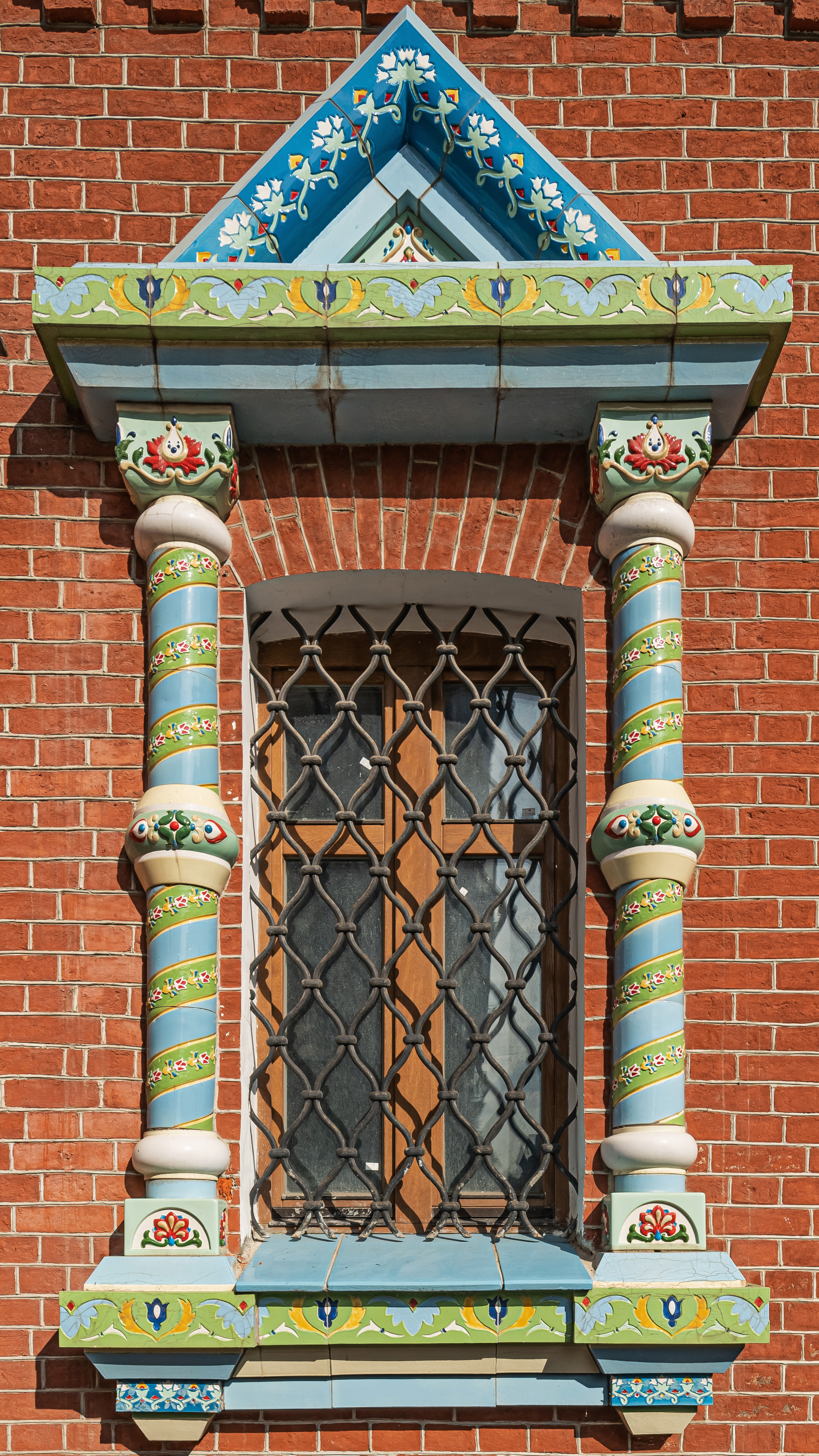
Russian Revival – Window of the Church of the Theotokos of Tikhvin, Moscow, by Nikolay Martyanov, 1911–1912

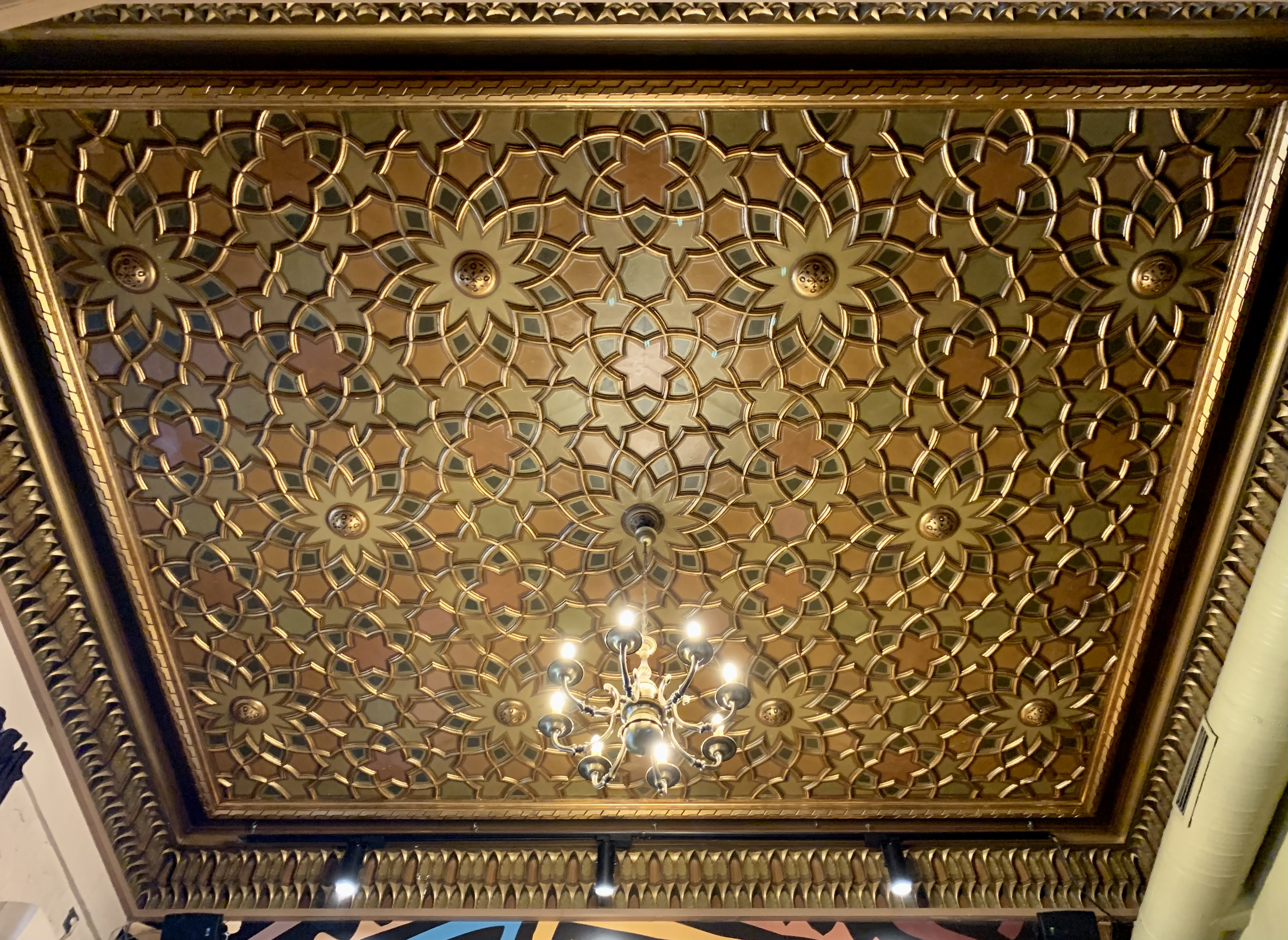
Moorish Revival – Ceiling in the Filitti House (Calea Dorobanților no. 18), Bucharest, by Ernest Doneaus, c. 1910

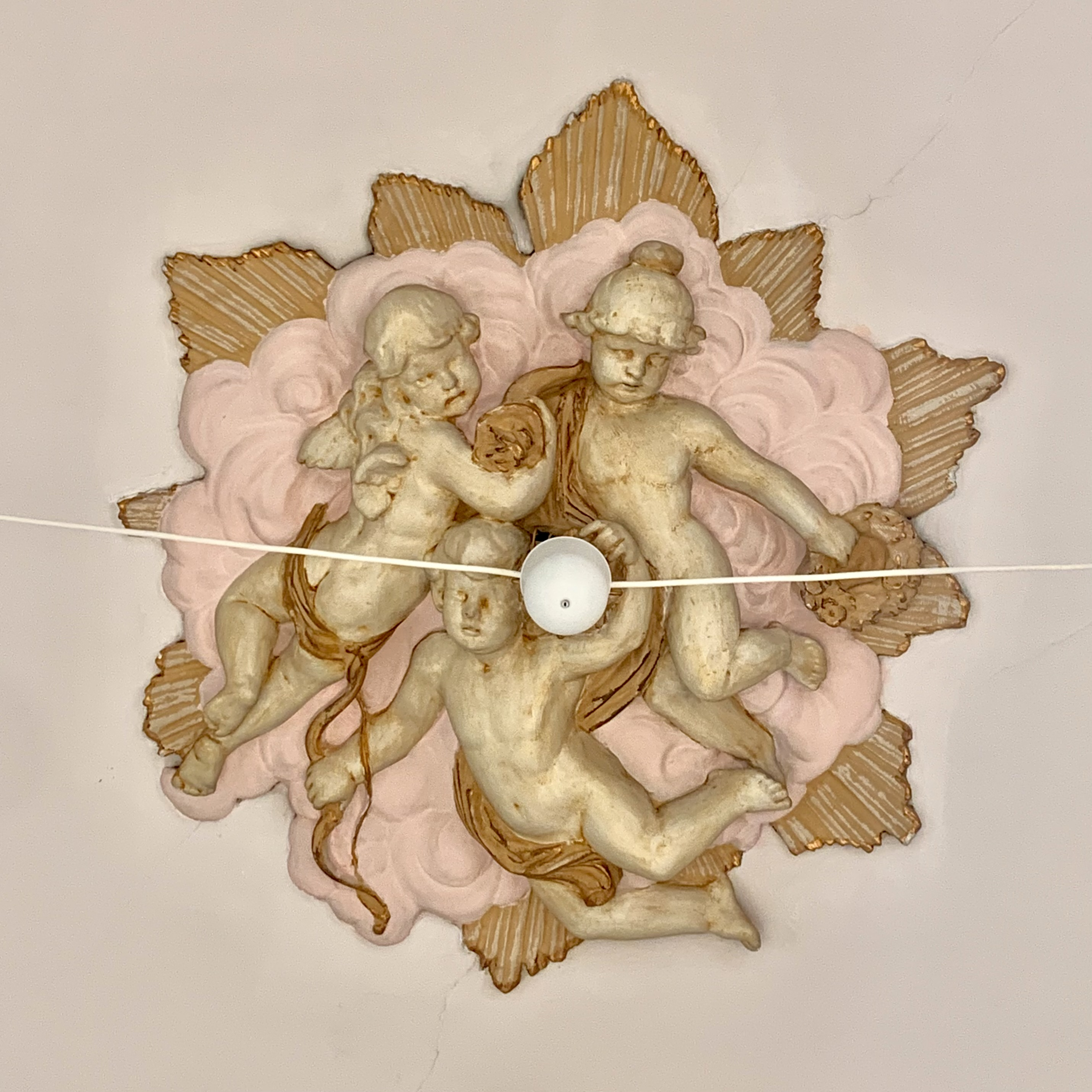
Beaux Arts – Stucco with putti on a ceiling in Piața Romană no. 3, Bucharest, by Siegfired Kofsinski and C. Crețoiu, 1912

=== Modernism ===
During the interwar period and the middle of the 20th century, Modernism was in fashion. To Modernists, form was more important than ornament, so solid blocks of strong colour were often used to emphasize shape and create contrast. Primary colours and black and white were preferred. This is really the case of the Dutch De Stijl movement, which began in 1917. The style involved reducing an object (whether a painting or a design) to its essentials, using only black, white and primary colours, and a simple geometry of straight lines and planes. Gerrit Rietveld's Red and Blue Chair (1917–1918) and Rietveld Schröder House in Utrecht (1924) show this use of colour. Polychromy in Modernist design was not limited to De Stijl. The Unité d'habitation, a residential housing typology developed by Le Corbusier, has some flat colourful parts.

Some Art Deco objects, buildings and interiors stand out through their polychromy and use of intense colours. Fauvism, with its highly saturated colours, like the paintings of Henri Matisse, was an influence for some Art Deco designers. Another influence for polychromy were the Ballets Russes. Leon Bakst's stage designs filled Parisian artistic circles with enthusiasm for bright colours.

Despite their lack of ornamentation, multiple Mid-century modern designs, like Lucienne Day's textiles, Charles and Ray Eames's Hang-It-All coat hanger (1953), or Irving Harper's Marshmallow sofa (1956), are decorated with colours. Aside from individual objects, mid-century modern interiors were also quite colourful. This was also caused by the fact that after WW2, plastics became increasingly popular as a material for kitchenware and kitchen units, light fixtures, electrical appliances and toys, and by the fact that plastic could be produced in a wide range of colours, from jade green to red.

De Stijl – Red and Blue Chair, by Gerrit Rietveld, 1917, lacquered wood, Toledo Museum of Art, Toledo, Ohio, US

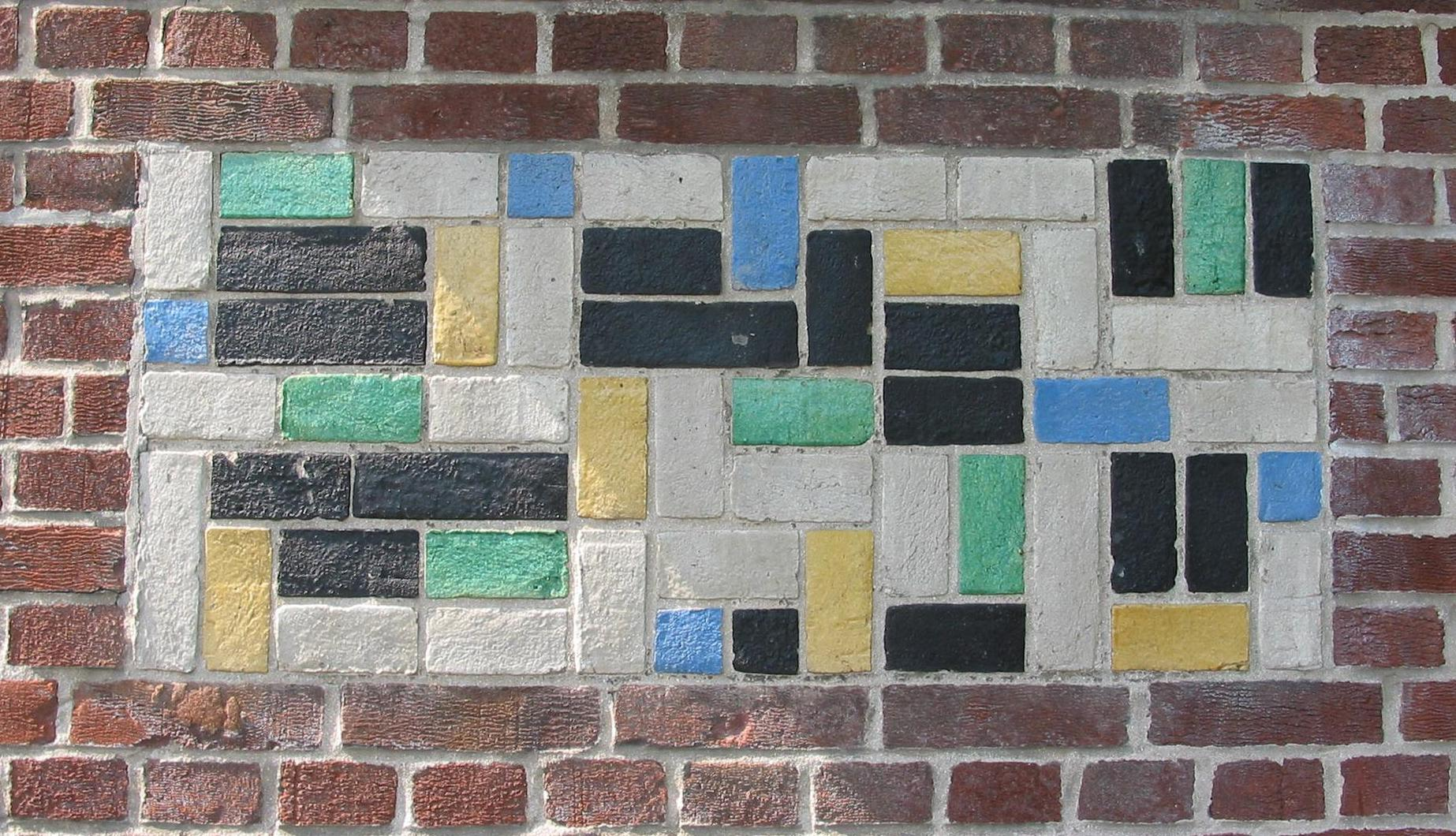
De Stijl – Panel of polychrome bricks on the exterior of the Vakantiehuis De Vonk, a house in Noordwijkerhout, the Netherlands, by Theo van Doesburg, 1917–1919

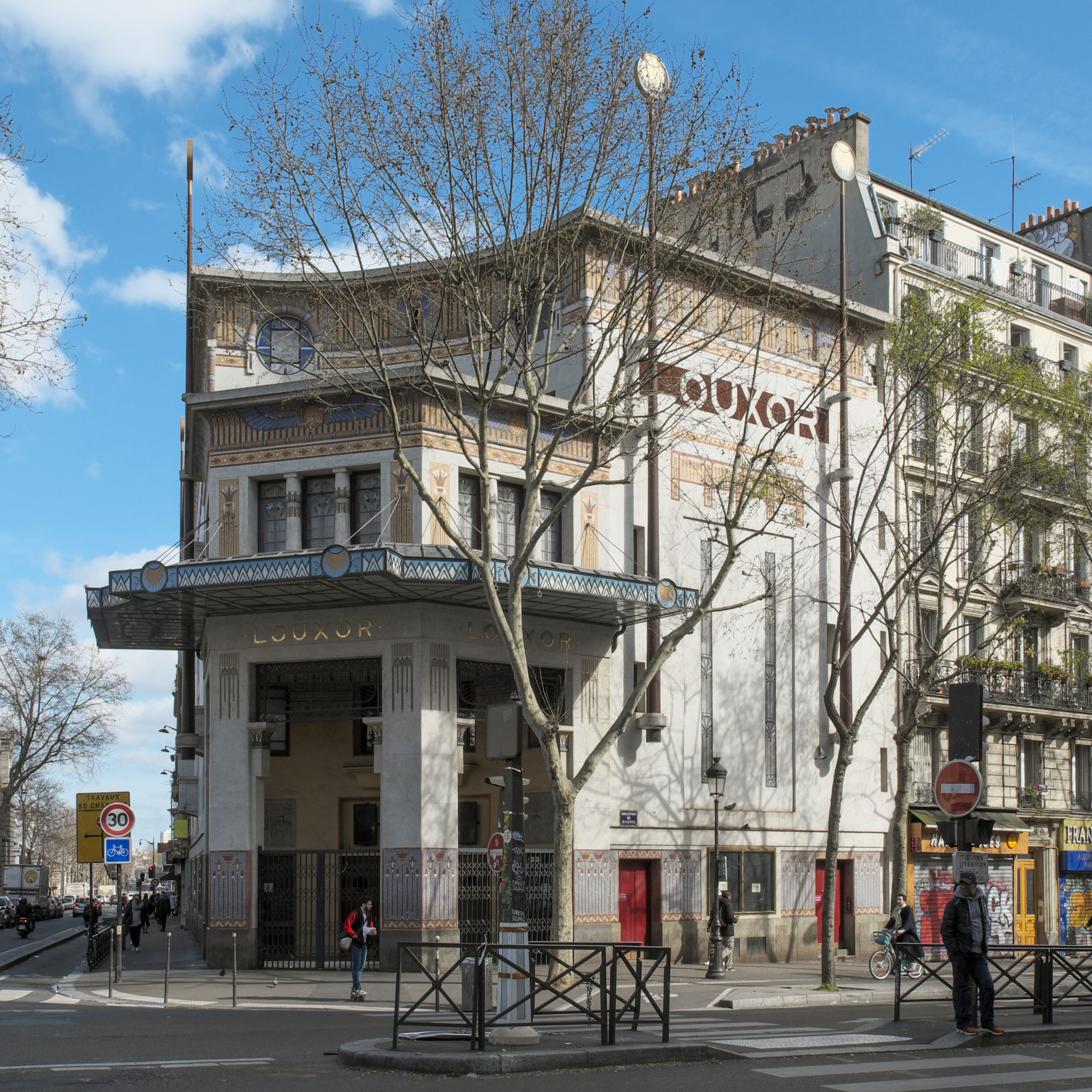
Mix of Egyptian Revival and Art Deco: Le Louxor Cinema, Paris, by Henri Zipcy, 1919–1921

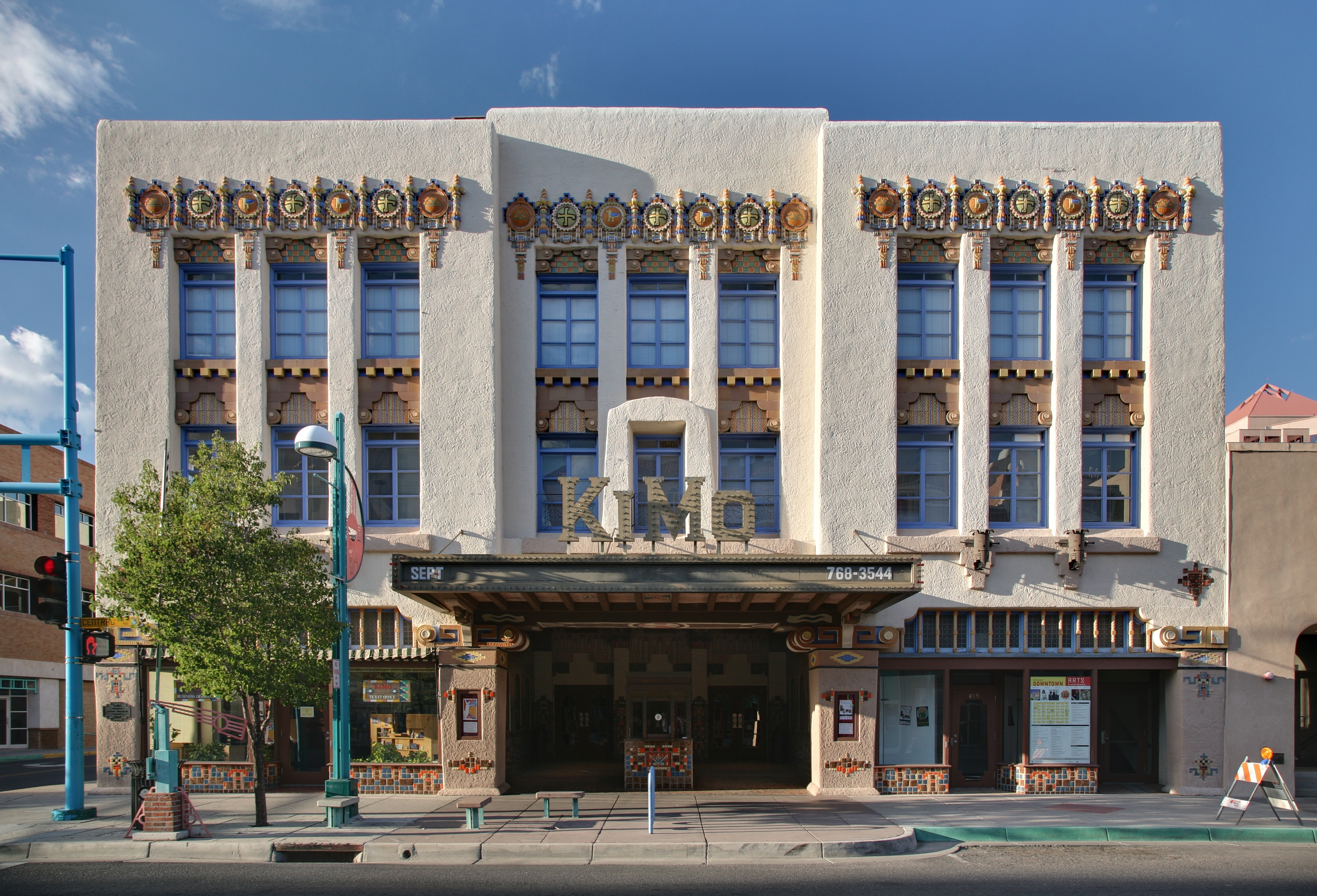
Mix of Pueblo Revival and Art Deco (Pueblo Deco): KiMo Theater, Albuquerque, US, by the Boller Brothers, 1927

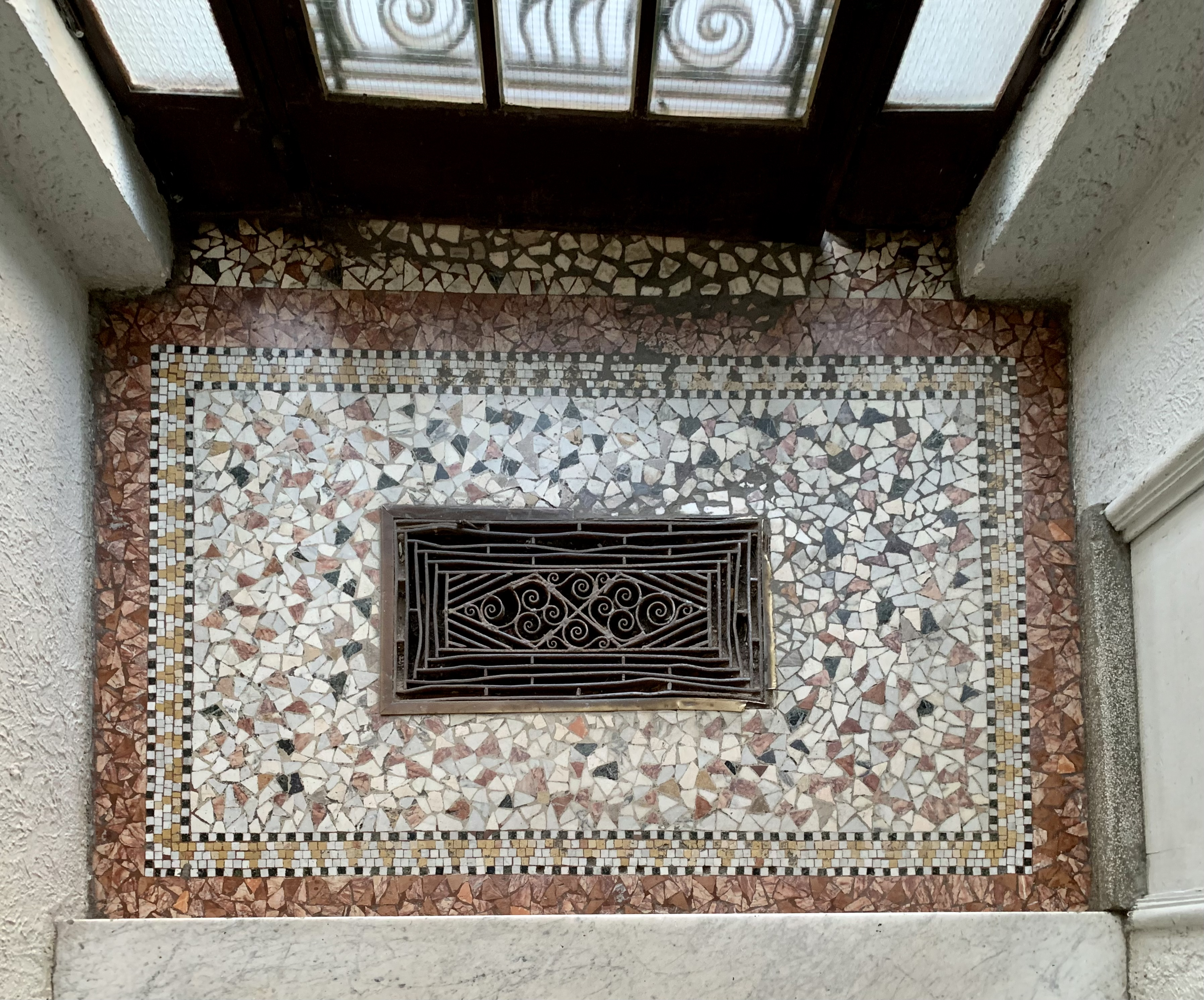
Art Deco – Floor in the entrance hall of Bulevardul Hristo Botev no. 26, Bucharest, unknown architect, 1930s

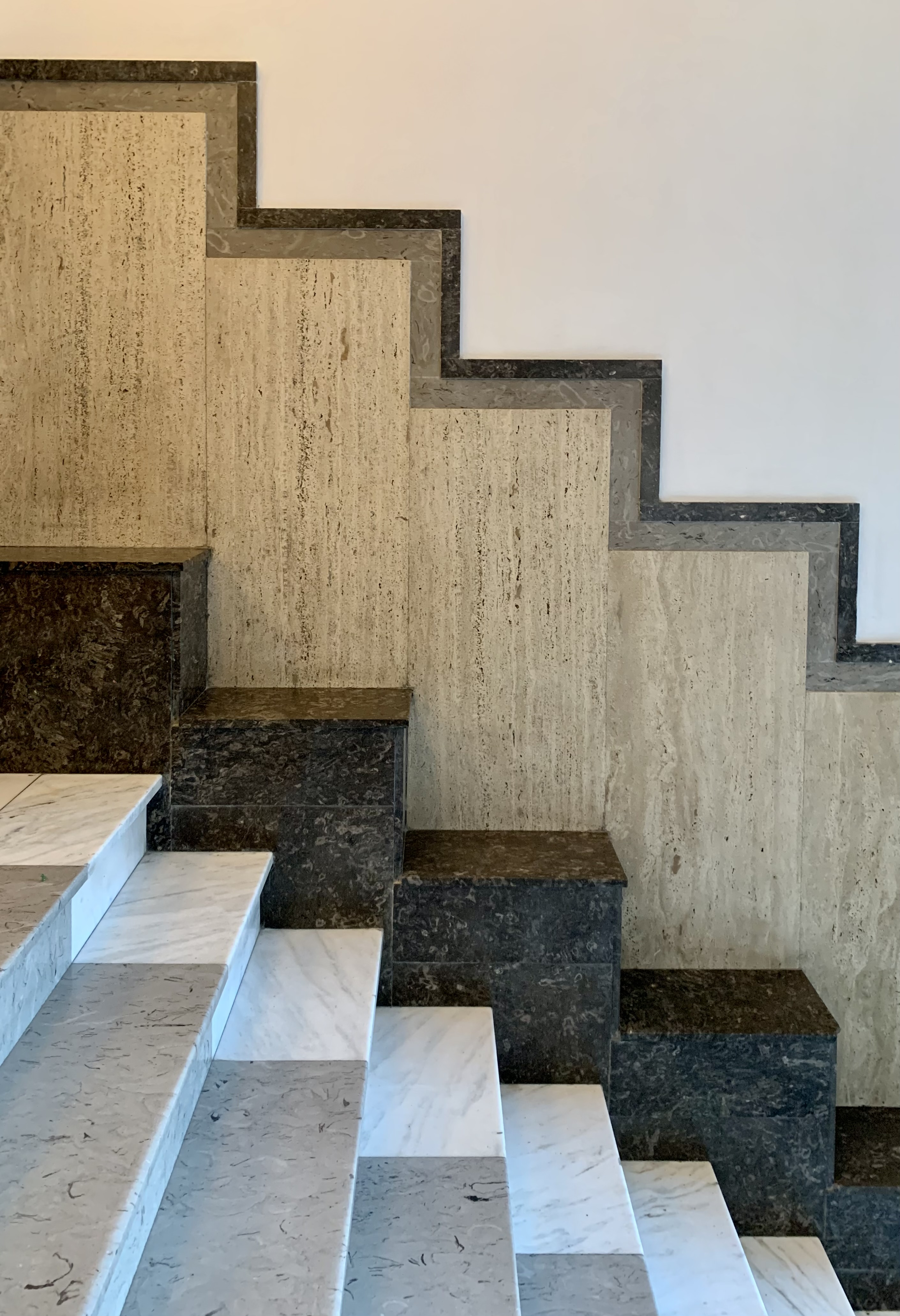
Art Deco – Marble facing in the entrance hall of Strada Pitar Moș no. 27–29, Bucharest, by Sandy Herivan, 1931–1933

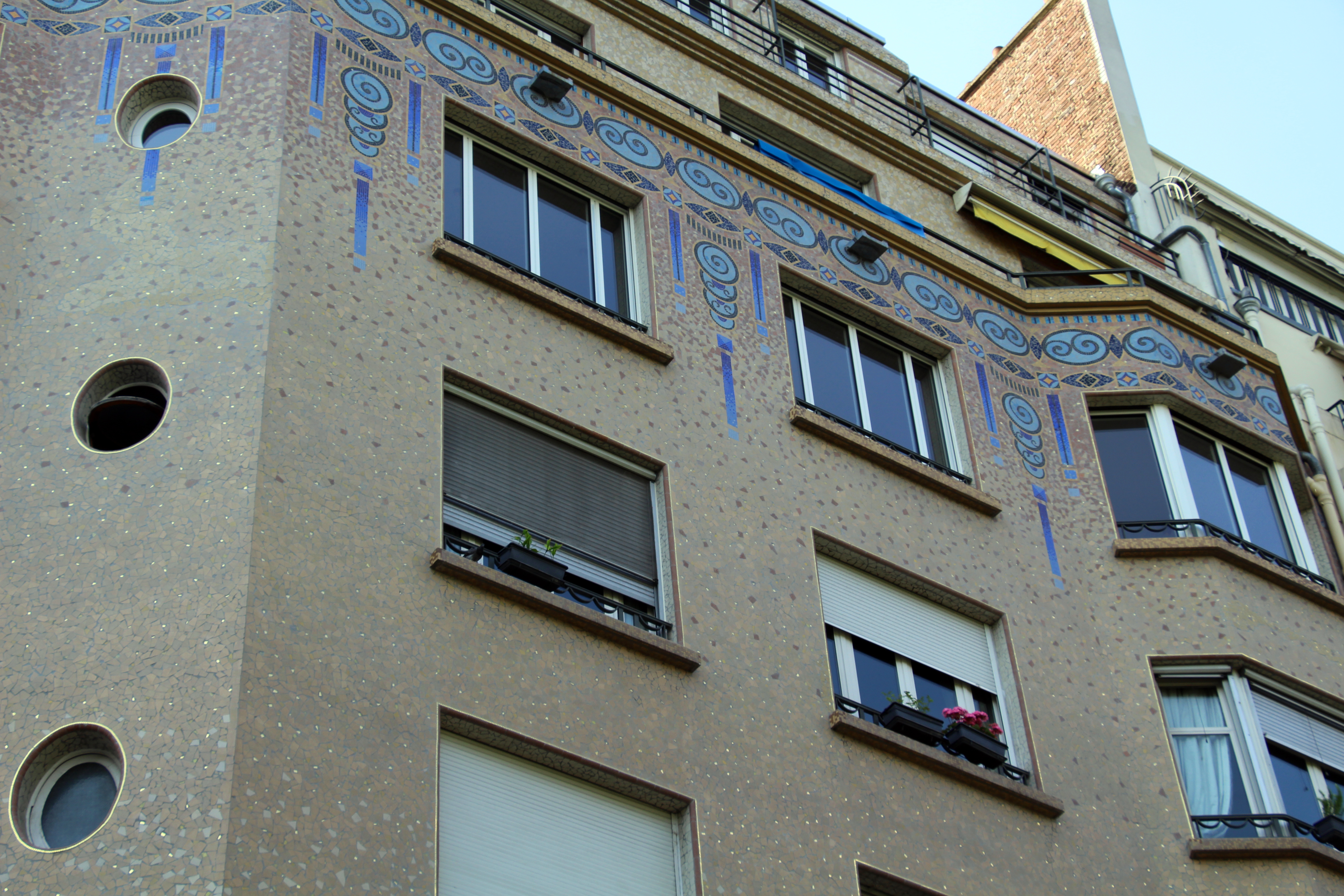
Art Deco – Mosaics on the facade of Quai Louis-Blériot no. 40, Paris, by Marteroy & Bonnel, 1932

International Style – Unité d'habitation, Marseille, France, by Le Corbusier, 1952

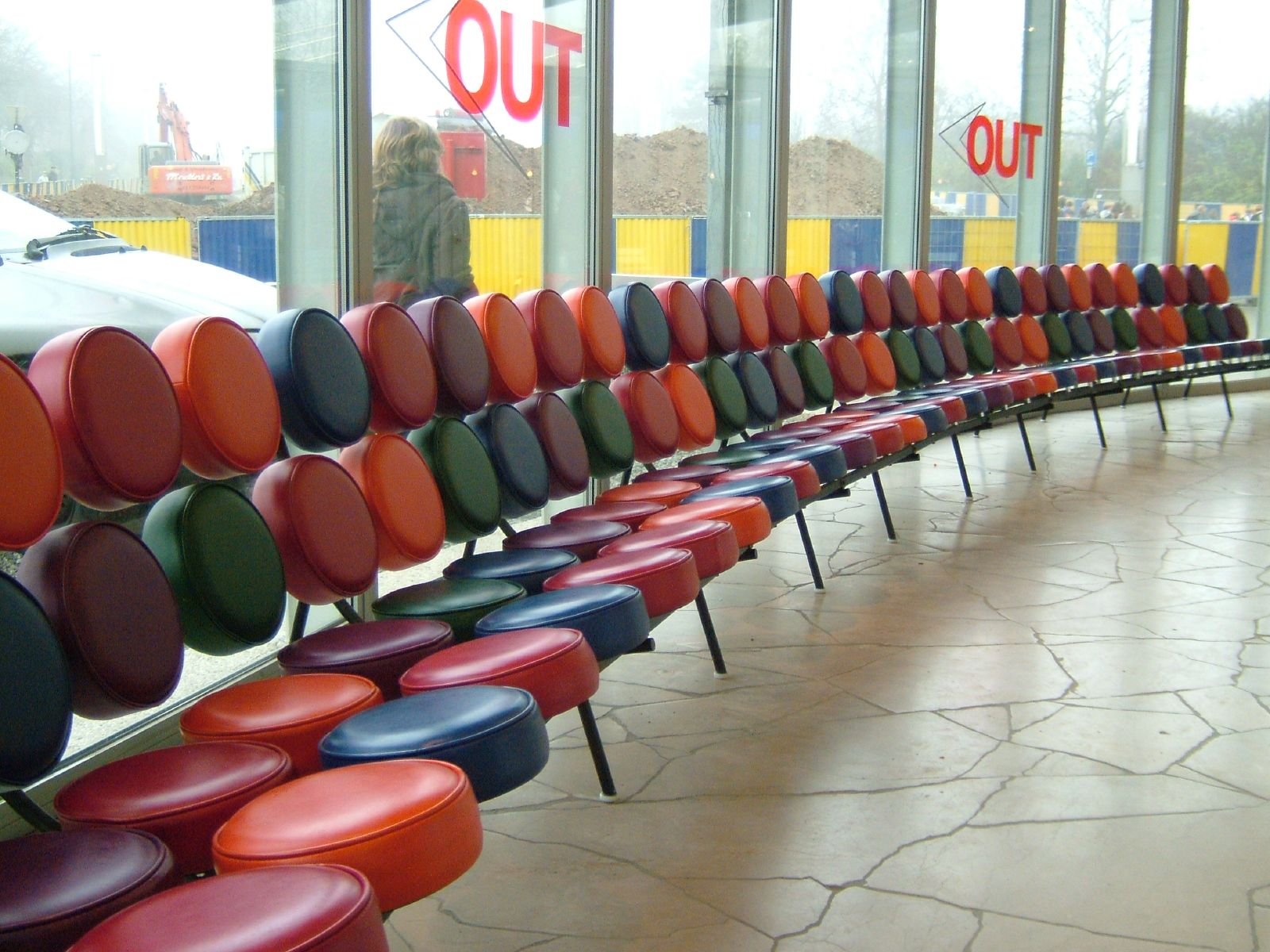
Mid-century modern – Marshmallow sofa, by Irving Harper for George Nelson Associates, 1956, metal frame with round discs of covered foam, unknown location

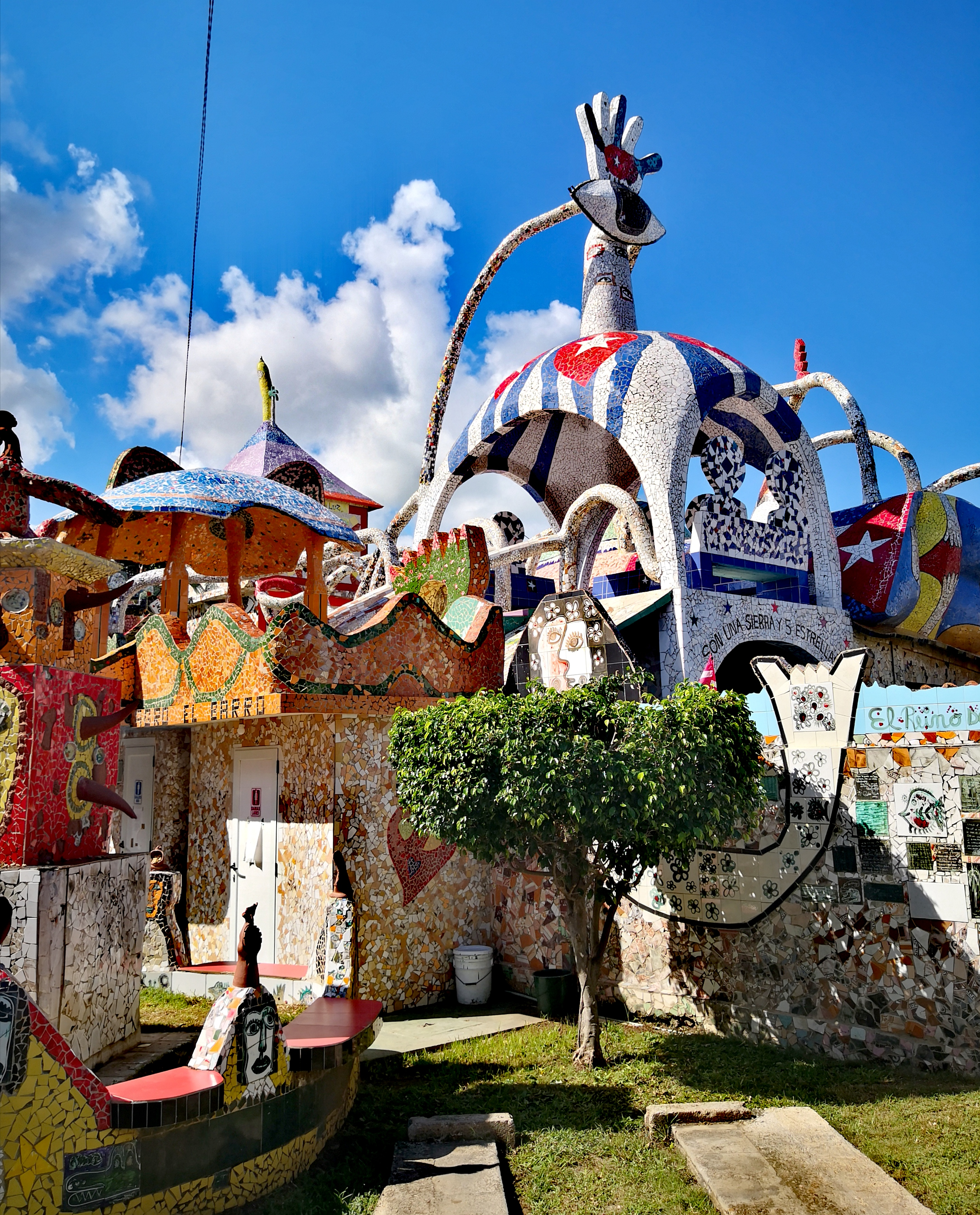
Fusterlandia, Havana, Cuba, by José Rodríguez Fuster, 1975

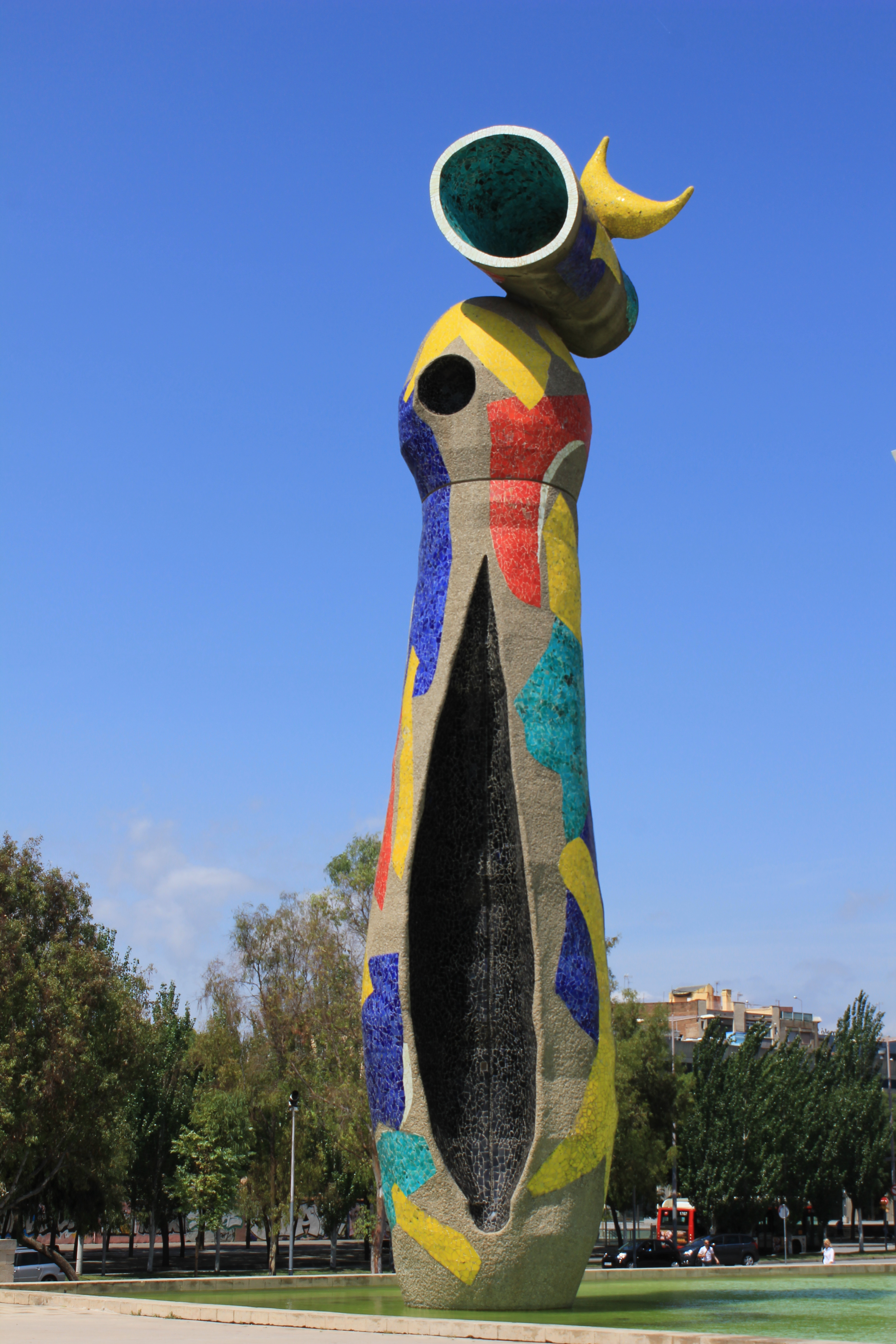
Dona i Ocell, by Joan Miró, 1983, glazed tile mosaic, Barcelona, Spain

=== Postmodernism ===
The use of vivid colours continued with Postmodernism, in the 1970s, 1980s and 1990s. Compared to Mid-century modern objects, which often had intense colours but were monochrome, Postmodern design and architecture stand out through the use of a variety of colours on single objects or buildings. Postmodern architects working with bold colors included Robert Venturi (Allen Memorial Art Museum addition; Best Company Warehouse), Michael Graves (Snyderman House; Humana Building), and James Stirling (Neue Staatsgalerie; Arthur M. Sackler Museum), among others. In the UK, John Outram created numerous bright and colourful buildings throughout the 1980s and 1990s, including the "Temple of Storms" pumping station. Aside from architecture, bright colours were present on everything, from furniture to textiles and posters. Neon greens and yellows were popular in product design, as were fluorescent tones of scarlet, pink, and orange used together. Injection-moulded plastics gave designers new creative freedom, making it possible to mass-produce almost any shape (and colour) quickly and cheaply.

An artist well known for her polychrome artworks is Niki de Saint Phalle, who produced many sculptures painted in bold colours. She devoted the later decades of her life to building a live-in sculpture park in Tuscany, the Tarot Garden, with artworks covered in vibrant colourful mosaics.

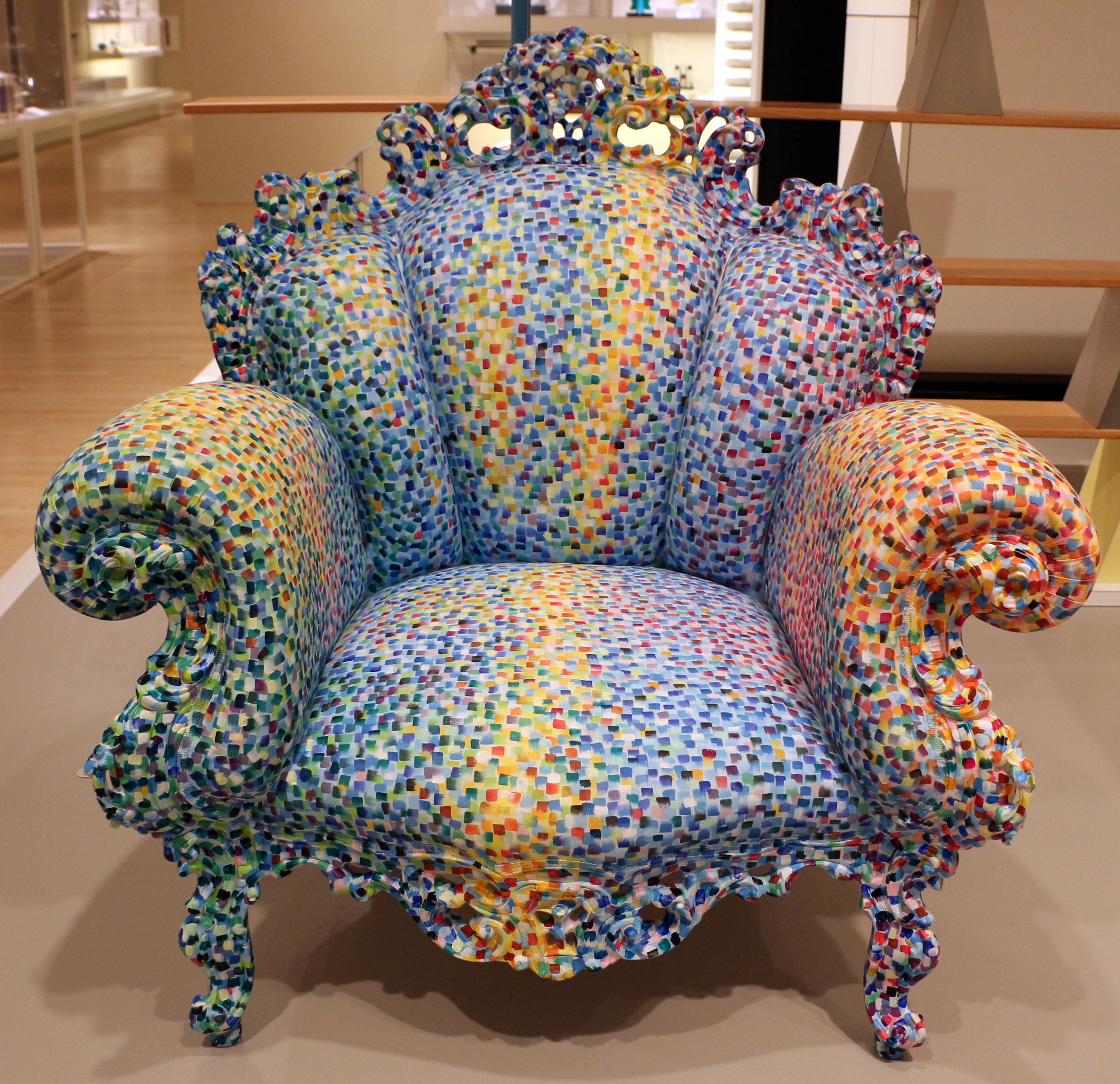
Proust armchair, by Studio Alchimia, 1978, wood and fabric, Indianapolis Museum of Art, Indianapolis, US

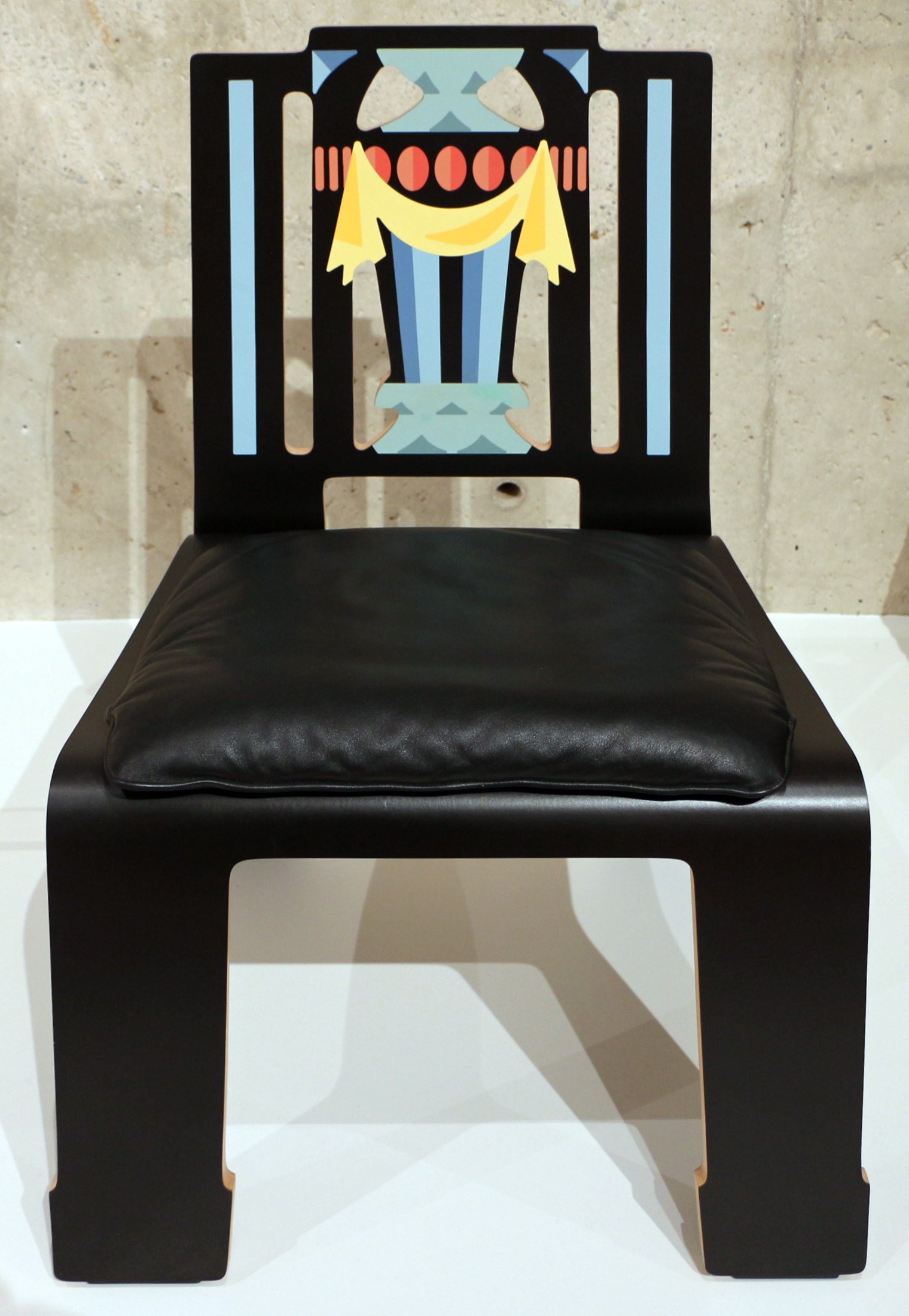
Sheraton chair with applied decoration, by Robert Venturi for Knoll, 1978–1984, bent laminated wood, Milwaukee Art Museum, Milwaukee, US

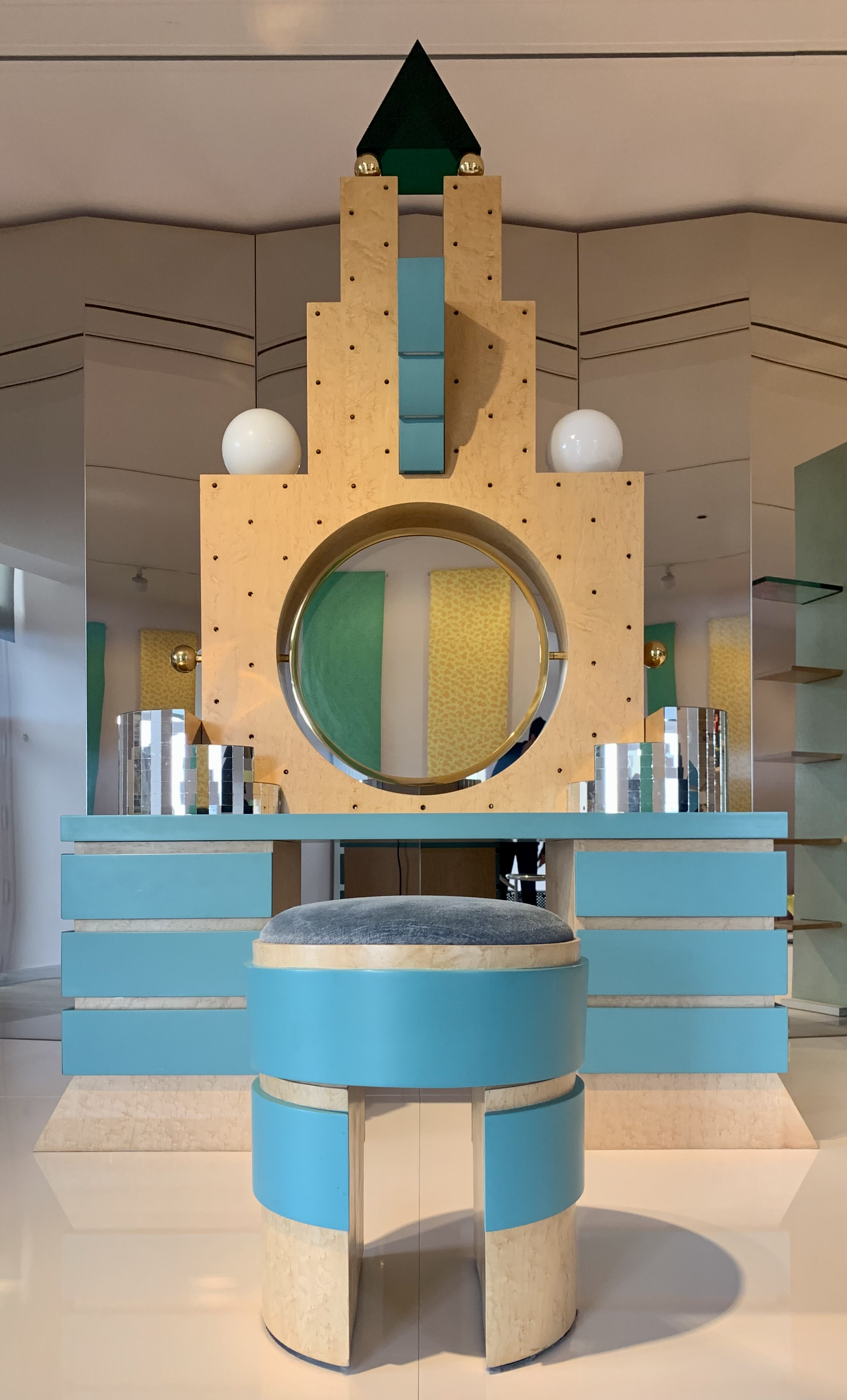
Plaza dressing table and stool, by Michael Graves for the Memphis Group, 1981, painted wood, natural rosehips, mirrors, and bulbs, Museum of Decorative Arts, Paris

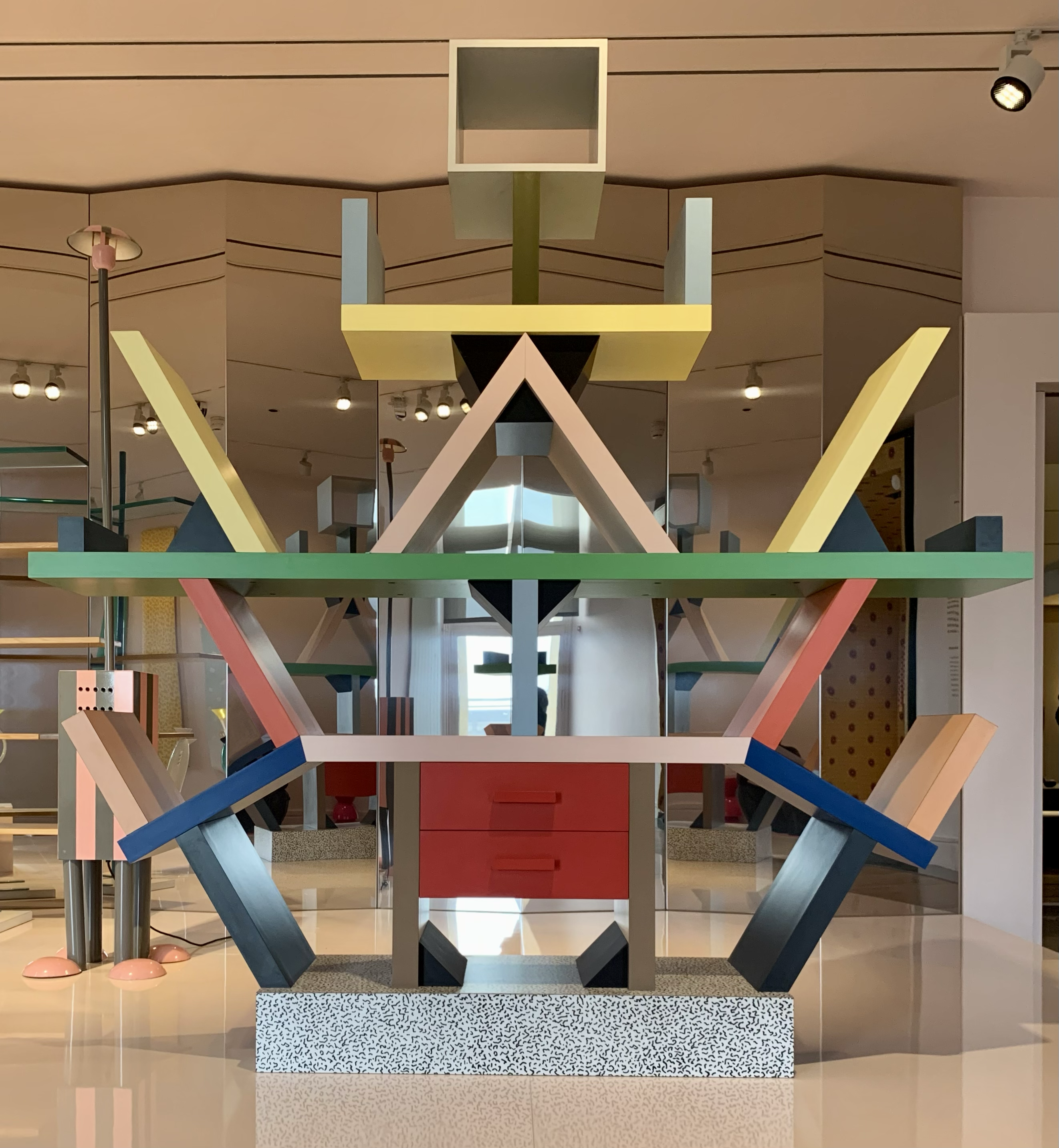
Carlton Bookcase, by Ettore Sottsass for the Memphis Group, 1981, wood veneer and plastic laminate, Museum of Decorative Arts, Paris

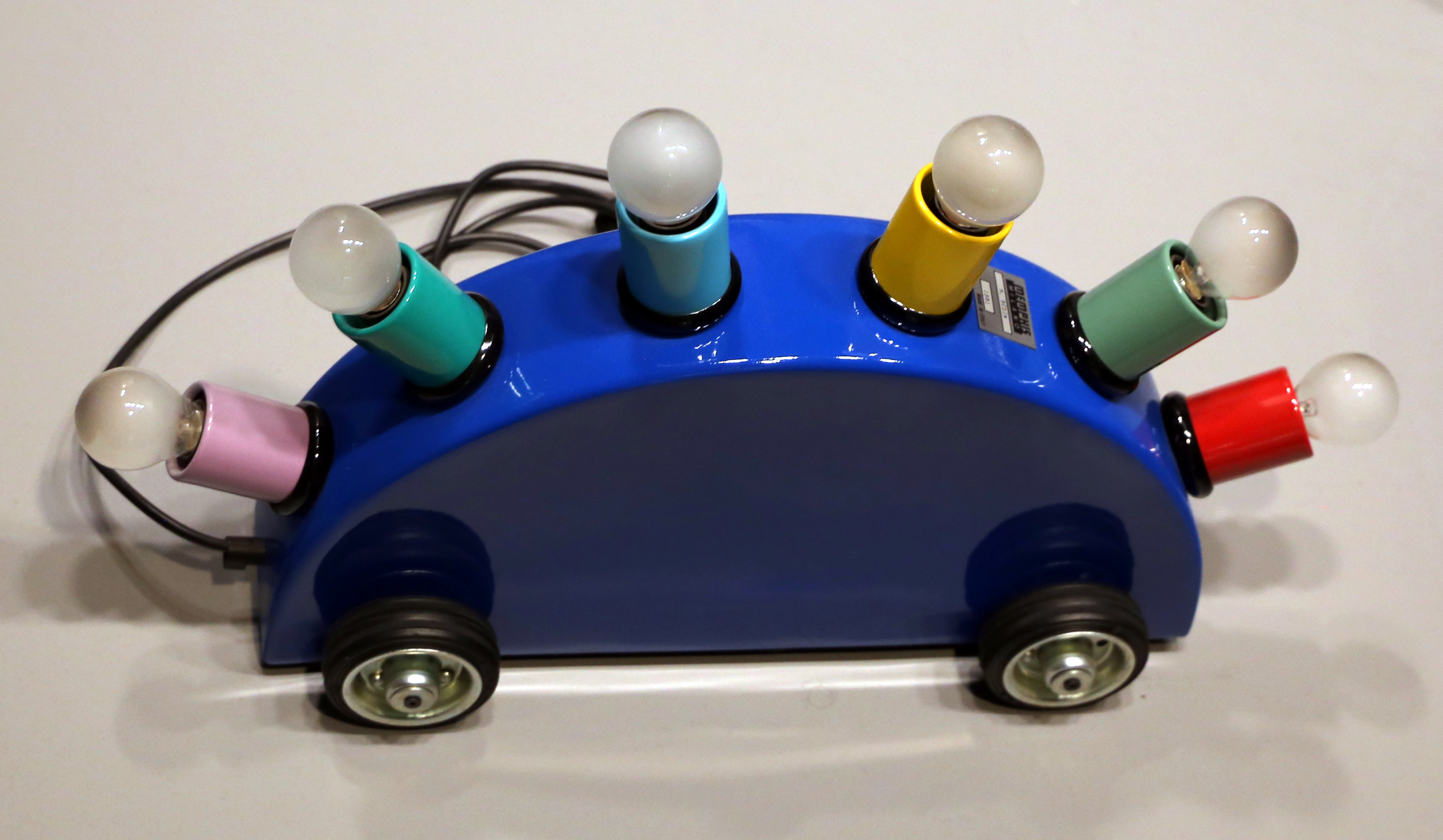
Super Lamp, by Martine Bedin for the Memphis Group, 1981, glazed stoneware, rubber and chrome-plated steel, Museum of Decorative Arts, Berlin, Germany

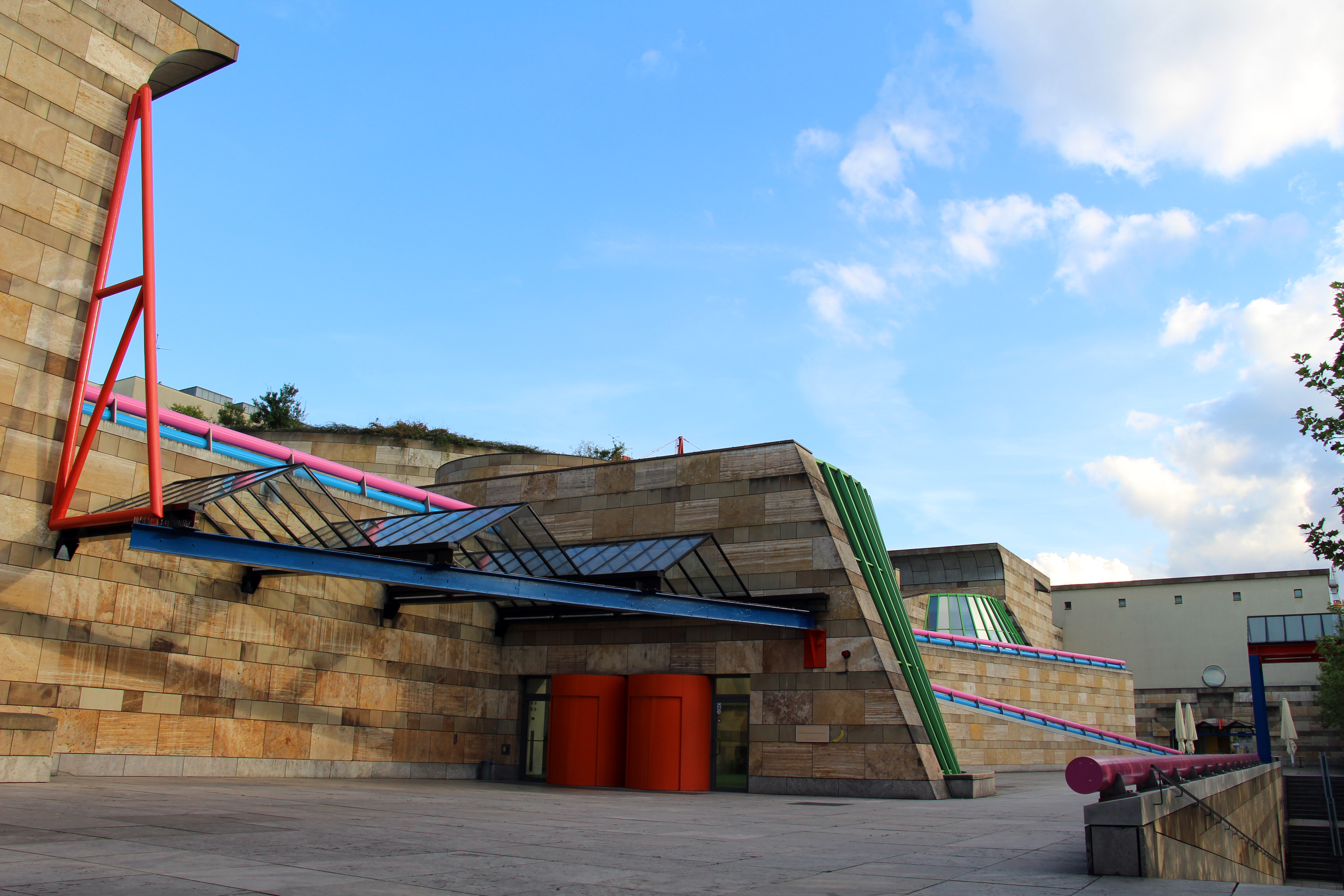
Neue Staatsgalerie, Stuttgart, Germany, by James Stirling, 1984

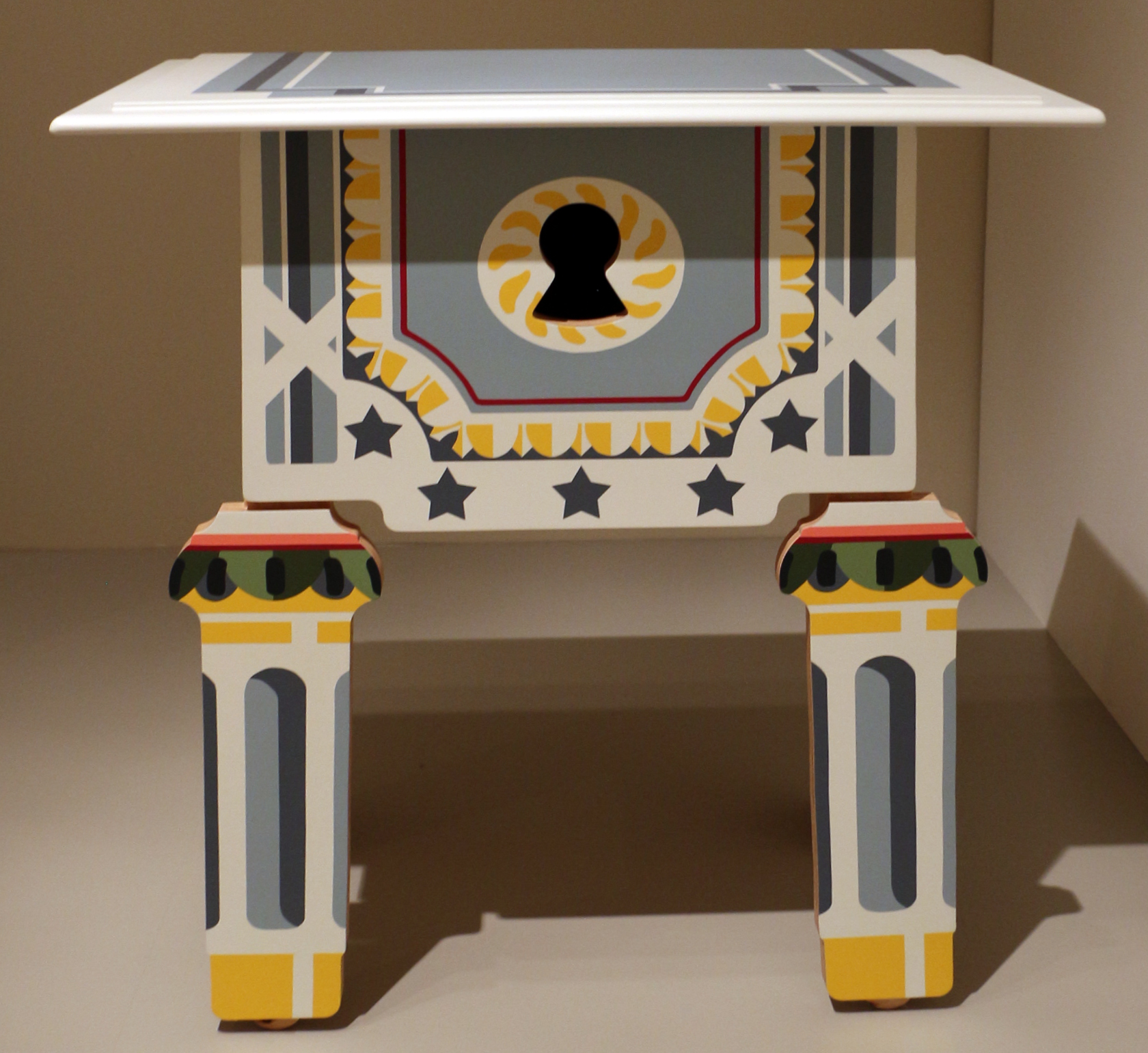
Louis XVI, lowboy, by Robert Venturi for Arc International, c. 1985, laminated wood, Indianapolis Museum of Art

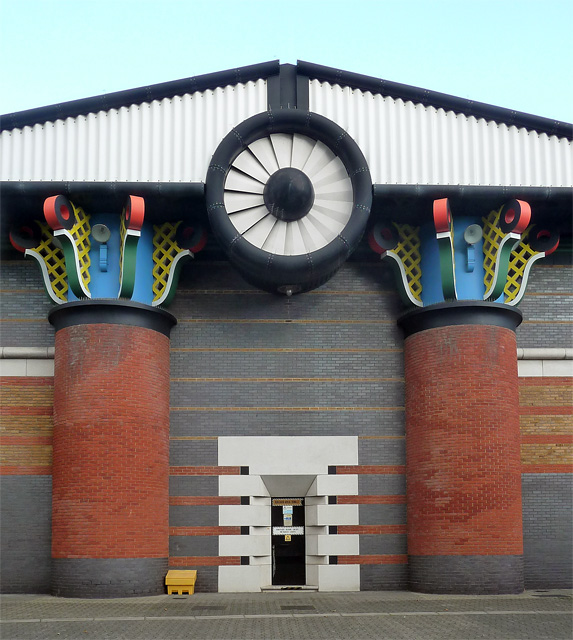
Isle of Dogs Pumping Station, London, John Outram, 1988

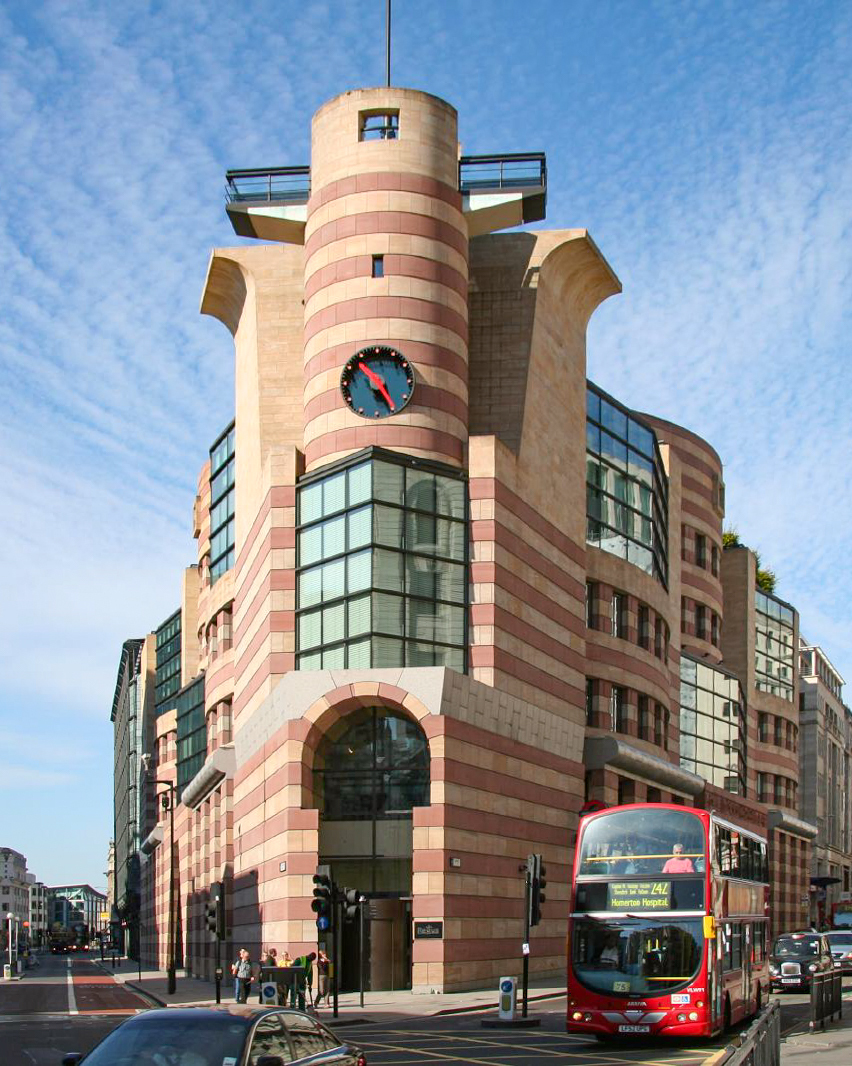
No 1 Poultry, London, by James Stirling, designed in 1988 but built in 1997

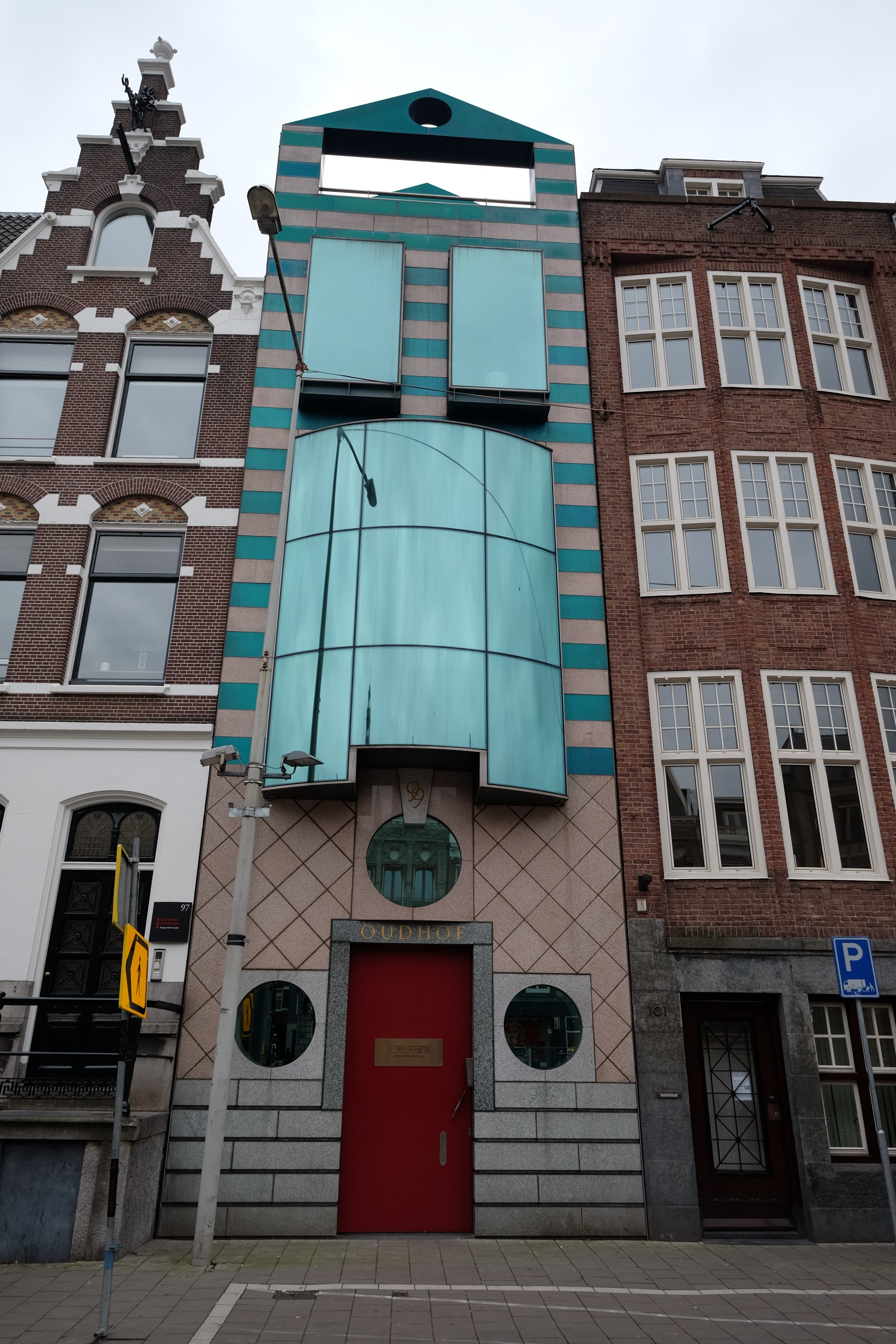
Oudhof (Rokin no. 99), Amsterdam, Netherlands, by Mart van Schijndel, 1988–1990

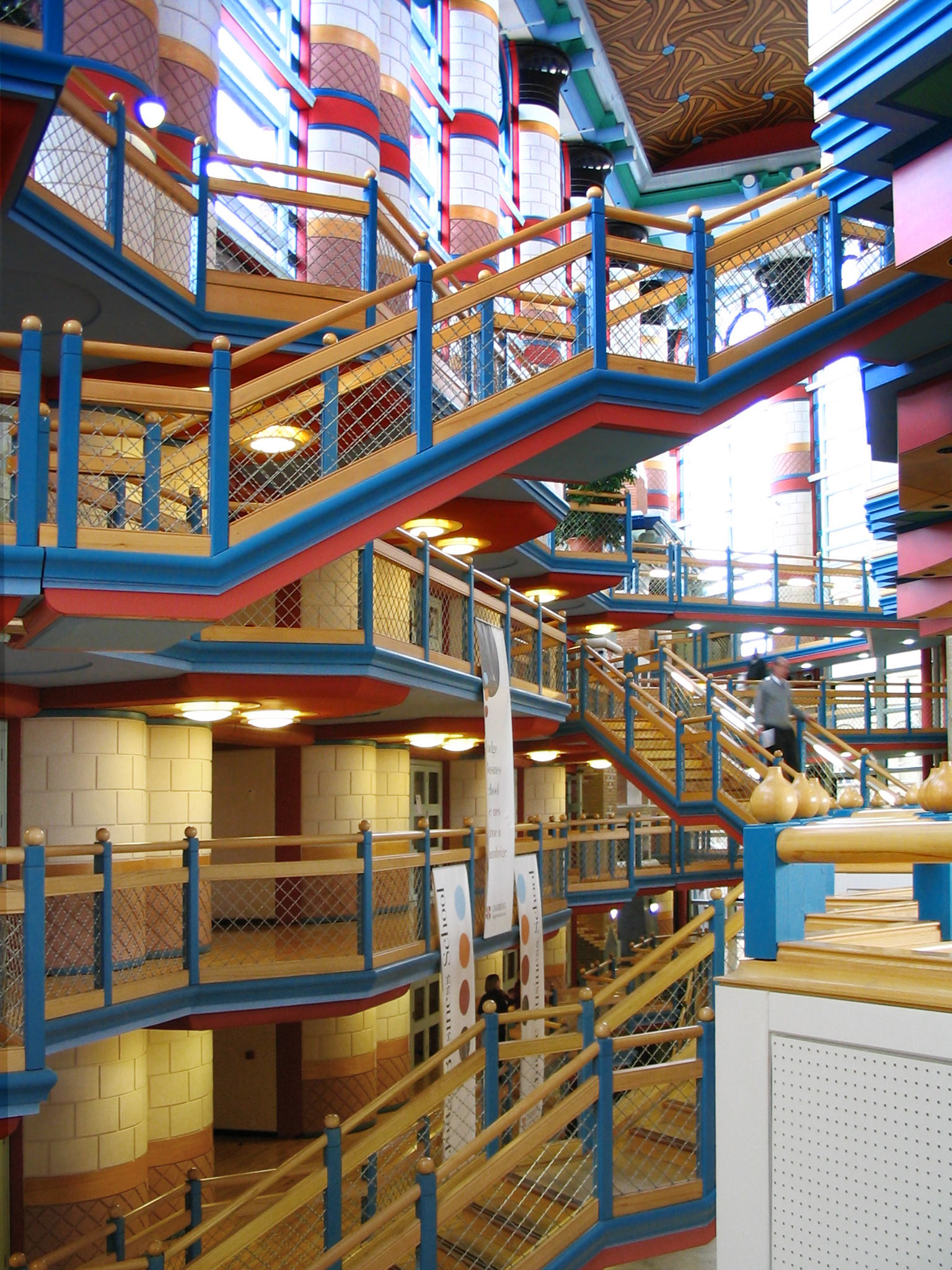
Main hall of the Judge Business School, University of Cambridge, England, by John Outram, 1995

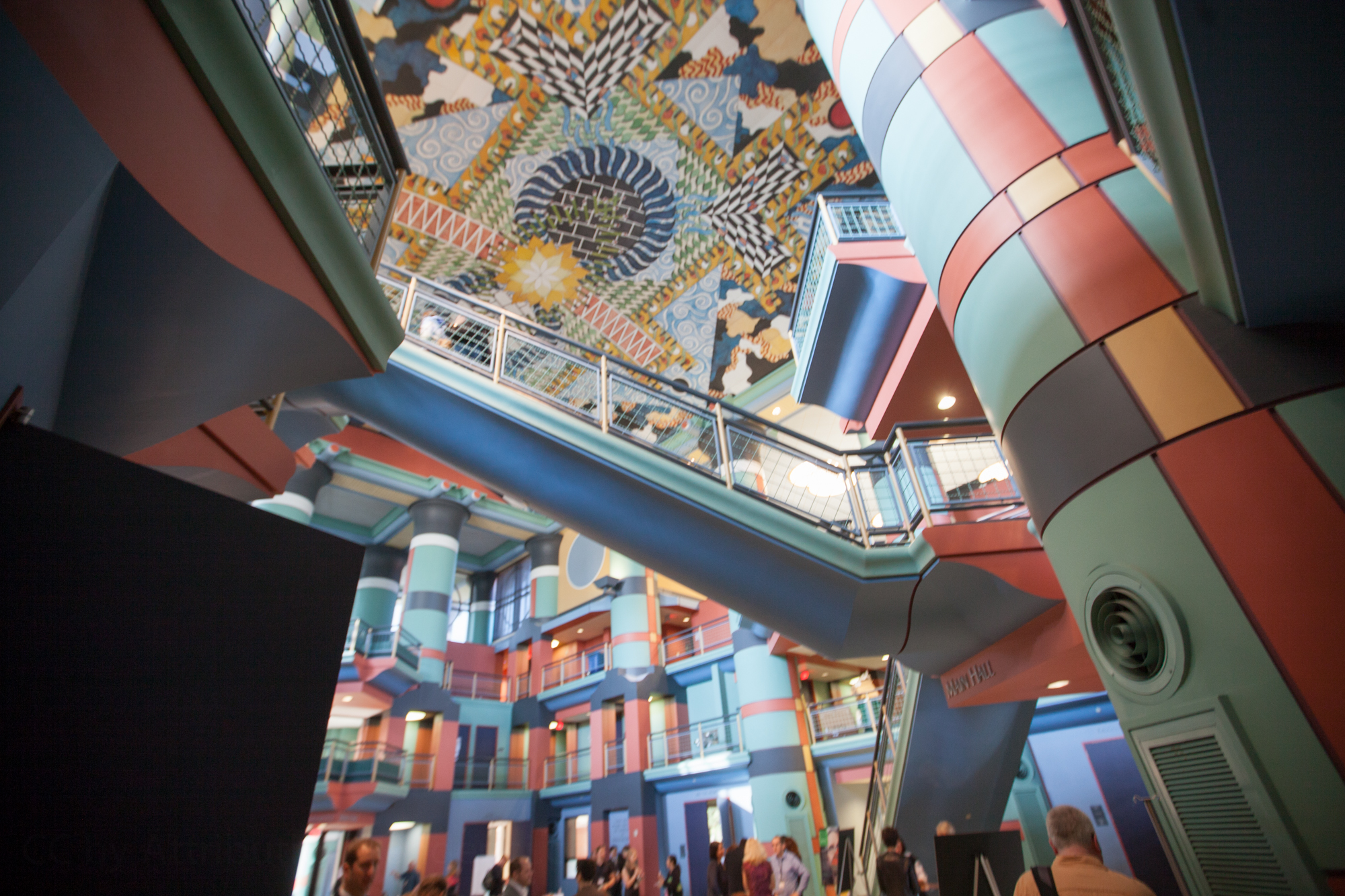
Duncan Hall, Rice University, US, by John Outram, 1996

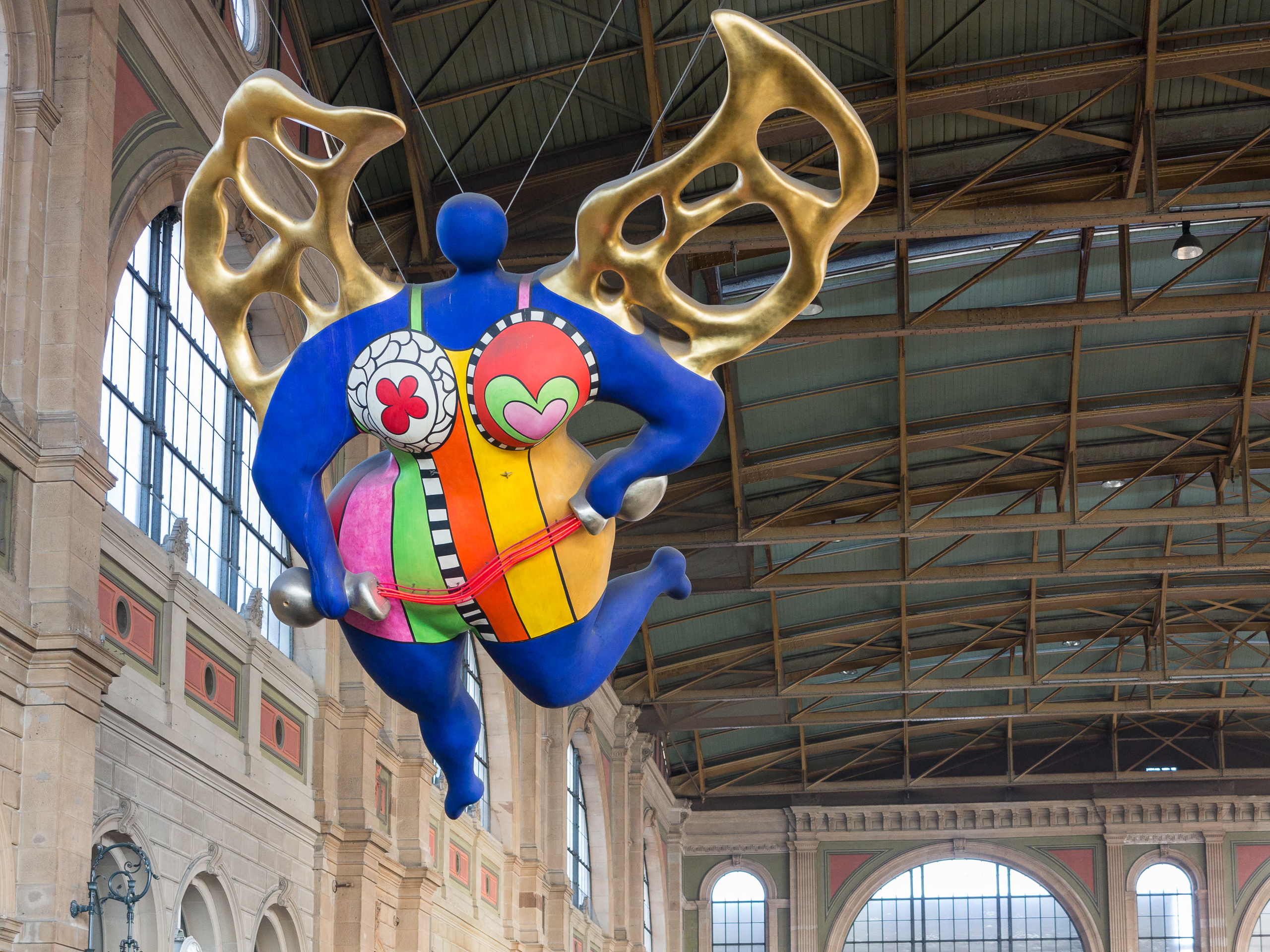
L'Ange Protecteur, by Niki de Saint Phalle, 1997, unknown materials, Zürich Hauptbahnhof, Zürich, Switzerland

=== United States ===
Polychrome building facades later rose in popularity as a way of highlighting certain trim features in Victorian and Queen Anne architecture in the United States. The rise of the modern paint industry following the American Civil War also helped to fuel the (sometimes extravagant) use of multiple colors.

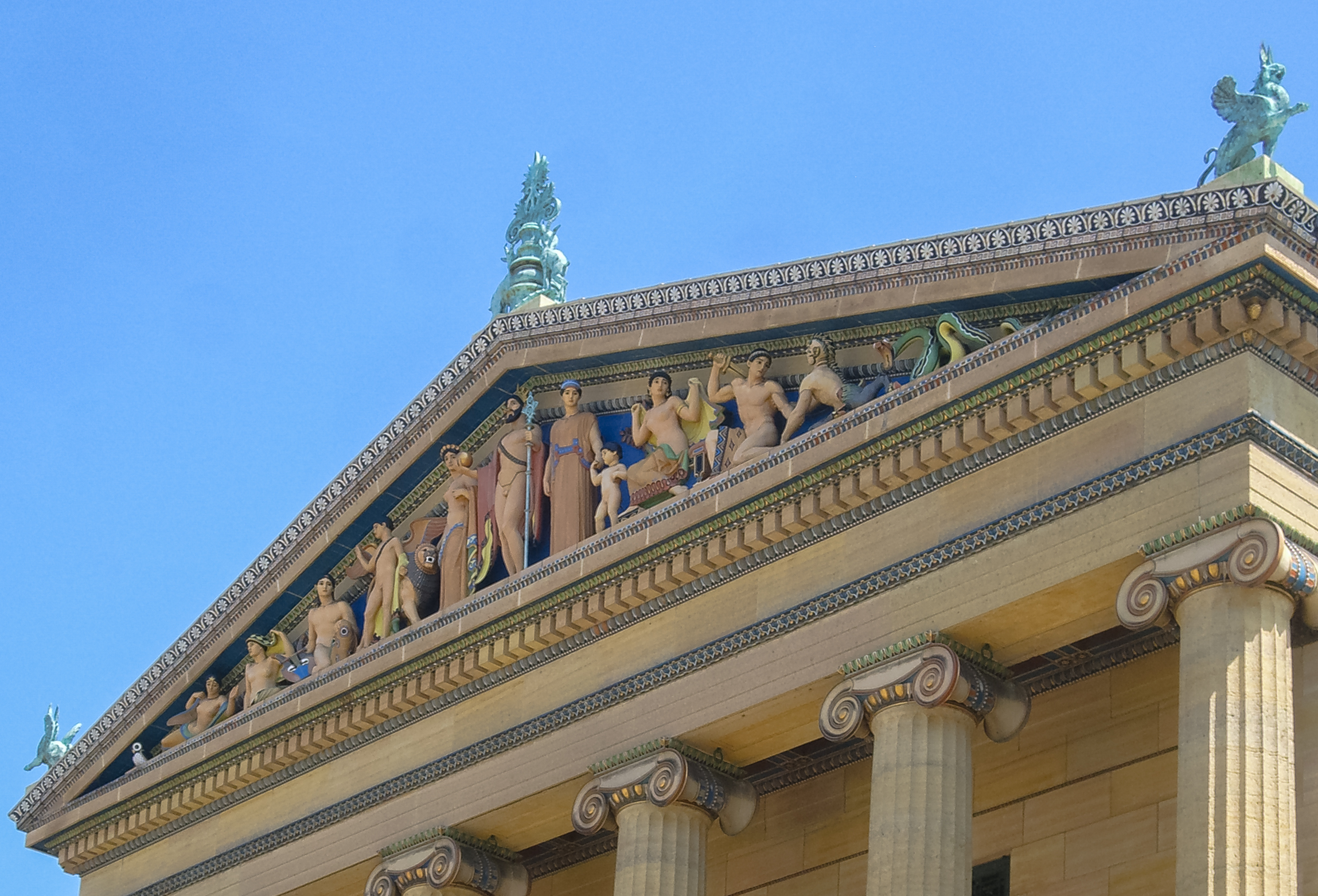
Early 20th Century polychrome pediment, Philadelphia Museum of Art (1928)

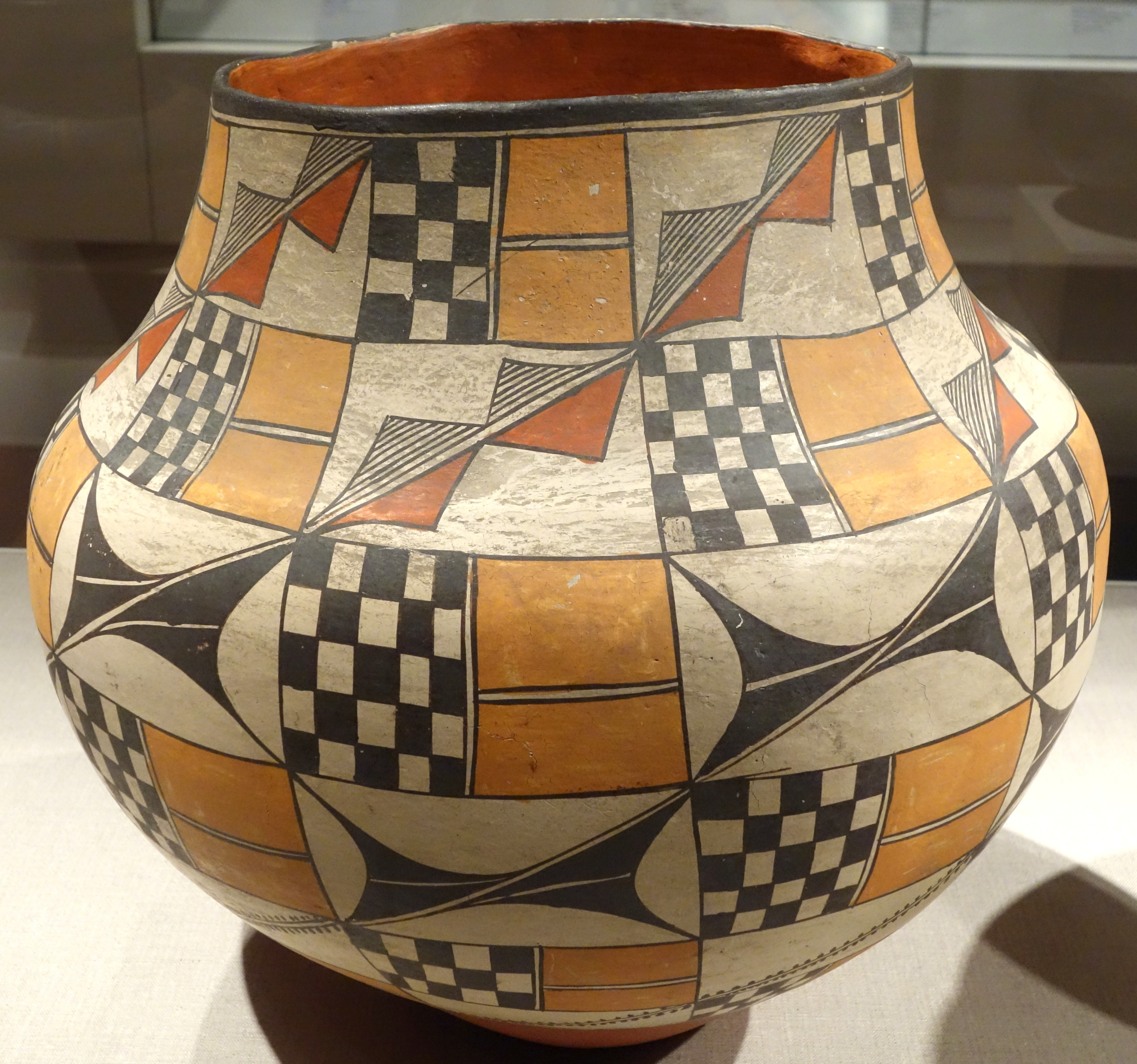
Water pot, Acoma Pueblo, c. 1889 – c. 1903, earthenware decorated with slip – De Young Museum

The polychrome facade style faded with the rise of the 20th century's revival movements, which stressed classical colors applied in restrained fashion and, more importantly, with the birth of modernism, which advocated clean, unornamented facades rendered in white stucco or paint. Polychromy reappeared with the flourishing of the preservation movement and its embrace of (what had previously been seen as) the excesses of the Victorian era and in San Francisco, California in the 1970s to describe its abundant late-nineteenth-century houses. These earned the endearment 'Painted Ladies', a term that in modern times is considered kitsch when it is applied to describe all Victorian houses that have been painted with period colors.

John Joseph Earley (1881–1945) developed a "polychrome" process of concrete slab construction and ornamentation that was admired across America. In the Washington, D.C. metropolitan area, his products graced a variety of buildings – all formed by the staff of the Earley Studio in Rosslyn, Virginia. Earley's Polychrome Historic District houses in Silver Spring, Maryland were built in the mid-1930s. The concrete panels were pre-cast with colorful stones and shipped to the lot for on-site assembly. Earley wanted to develop a higher standard of affordable housing after the Depression, but only a handful of the houses were built before he died; written records of his concrete casting techniques were destroyed in a fire. Less well-known, but just as impressive, is the Dr. Fealy Polychrome House that Earley built atop a hill in Southeast Washington, D.C. overlooking the city. His uniquely designed polychrome houses were outstanding among prefabricated houses in the country, appreciated for their Art Deco ornament and superb craftsmanship.

Native American ceramic artists, in particular those in the Southwest, produced polychrome pottery from the time of the Mogollon cultures and Mimbres peoples to contemporary times.

== 21st century ==
In the 2000s, the art of designing art toys was taking off. Multiple monochrome or polychrome vinyl figurines were produced during this period, and are still produced during the 2020s. A few artists who designed vinyl toys include Joe Ledbetter, Takashi Murakami, Flying Förtress, and CoonOne1.

During the 2010s and the early 2020s, a new interest for Postmodern architecture and design appeared. One of the causes were memorial exhibitions that presented the style, the most comprehensive and influential one being held at the Victoria & Albert Museum in London in 2011, called Postmodernism: Style and Subversion 1970–1990. The Salone del Mobile in Milan since 2014 showcased revivals, reinterpretations, and new postmodern-influenced designs. Because of this, multiple funky polychrome buildings were erected, like the House for Essex, Wrabness, Essex, the UK, by FAT and Grayson Perry, 2014 or the Miami Museum Garage, Miami, US, by WORKac, 2018.

Besides revivals of Postmodernism, another key design movement of the early 2020s is Maximalism. Since its philosophy can be summarized as "more is more", contrasting with the minimalist motto "less is more", it is characterized by a wide use of intense colours and patterns.

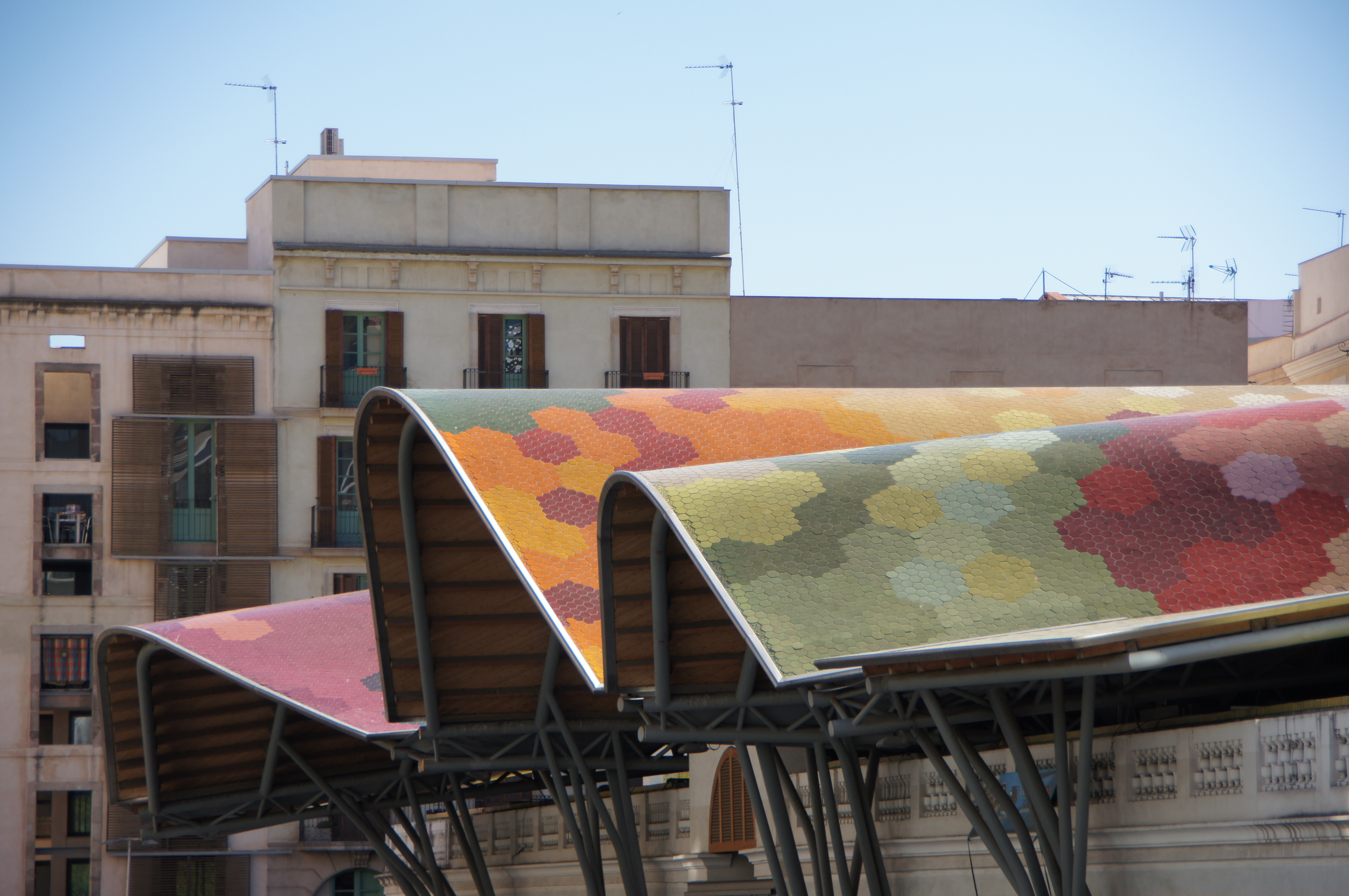
Roof of the Santa Caterina Market, Barcelona, Spain, by Benedetta Tagliabue and Enric Miralles, 2004

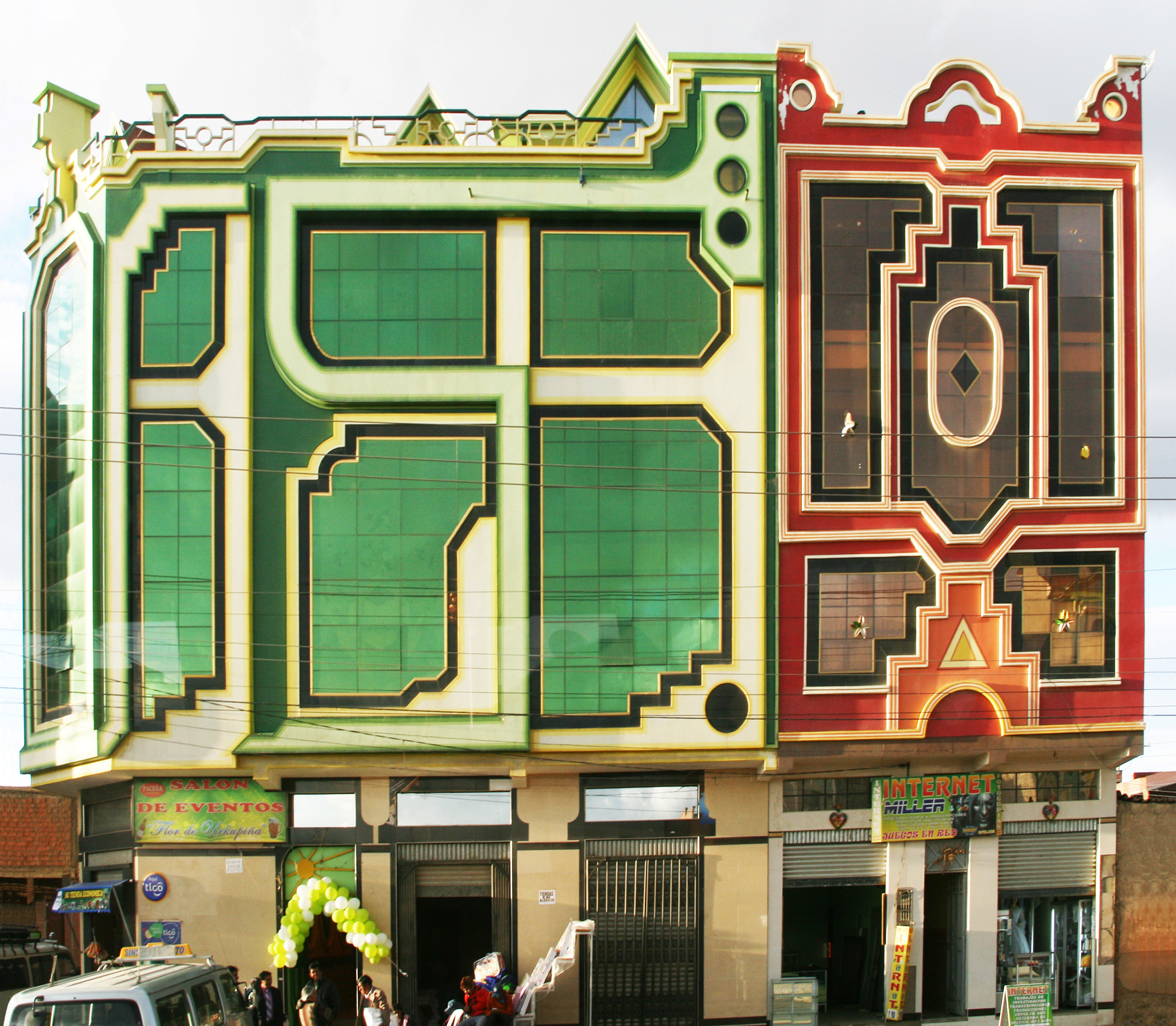
Buildings in El Alto, Bolivia, by Freddy Mamani (architect), after 2005

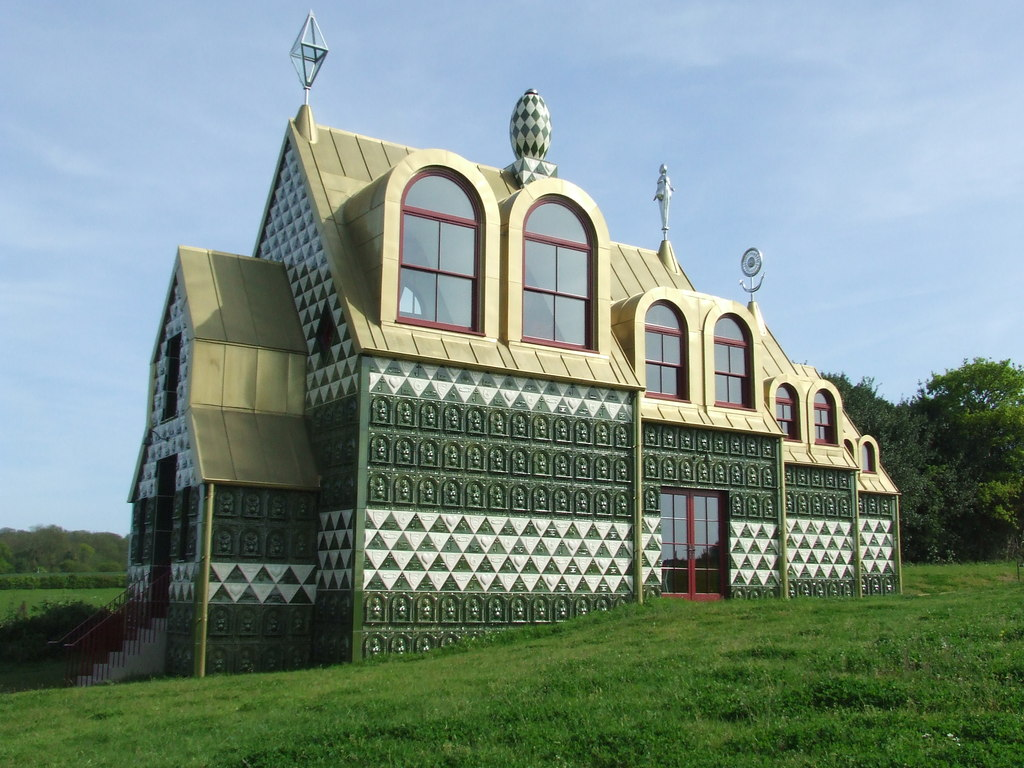
House for Essex, Wrabness, Essex, the UK, by FAT and Grayson Perry, 2014

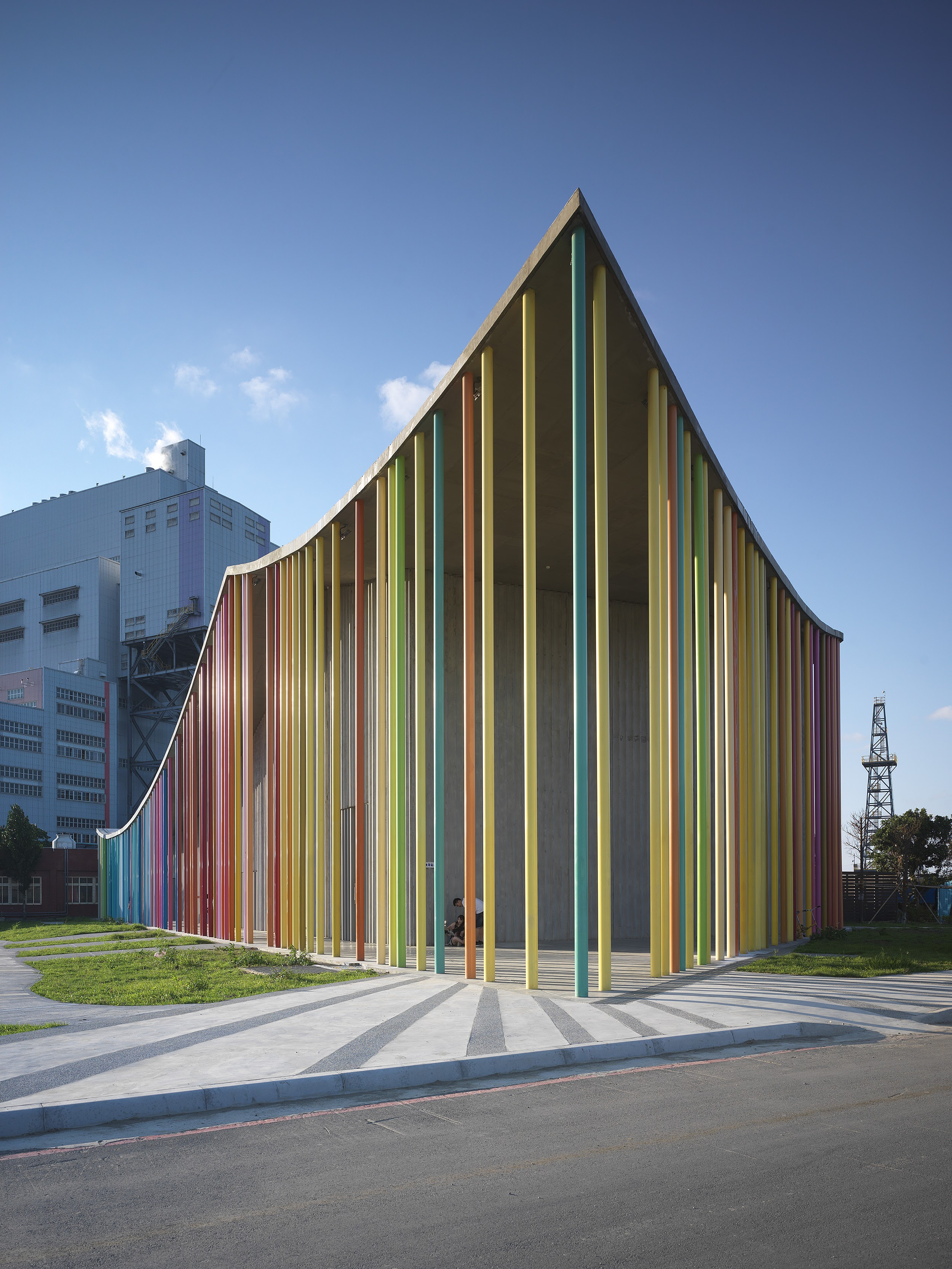
Xiafu Activity Center, Xiafu, Taiwan, by IMO Architecture + Design and JC Cheng & Associates, Architects & Planners, 2017

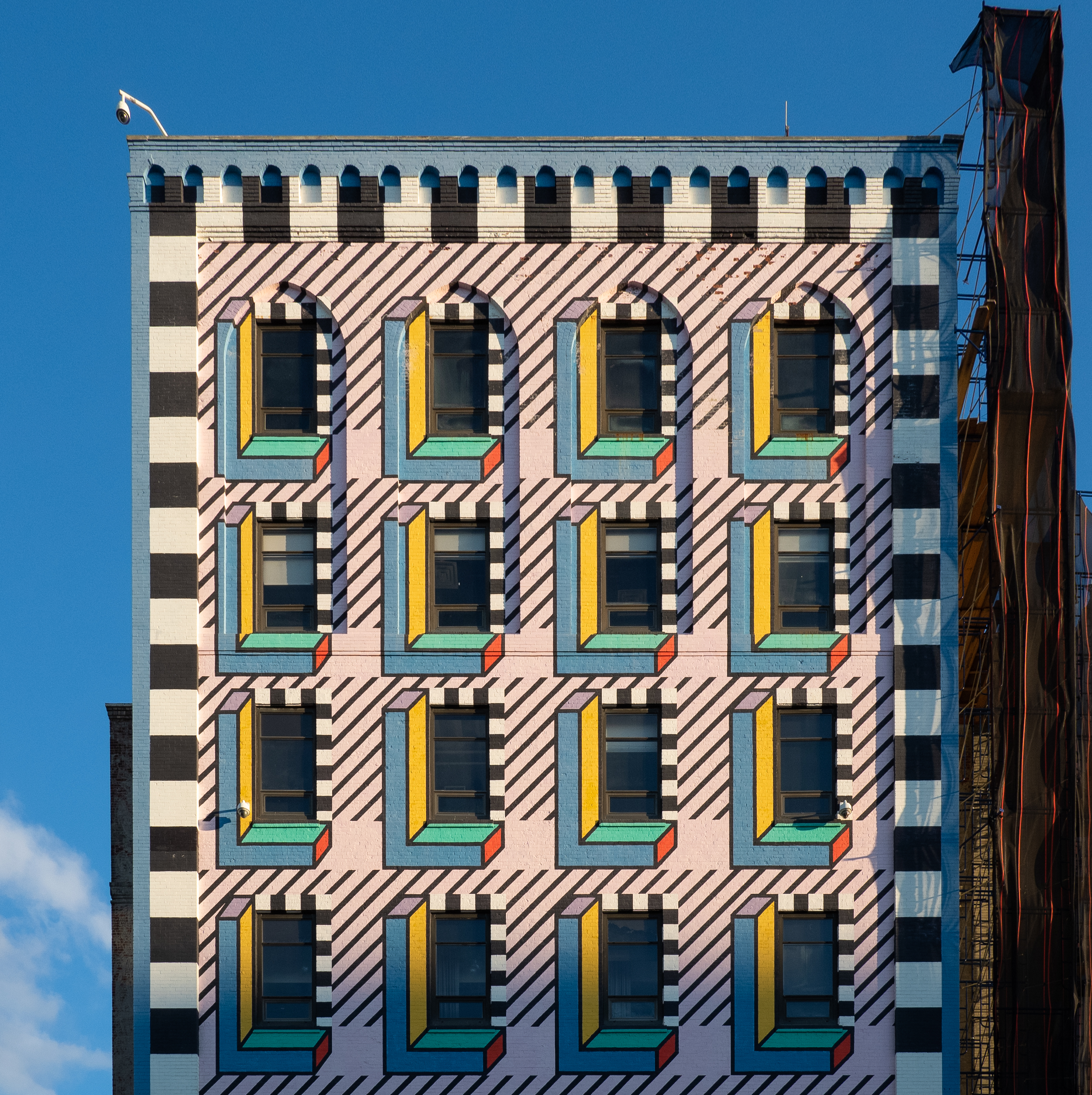
Memphis Group-inspired mural on a 7-storey building, Brooklyn, NYC, by Camille Walala, probably 2018, mural on a brick wall

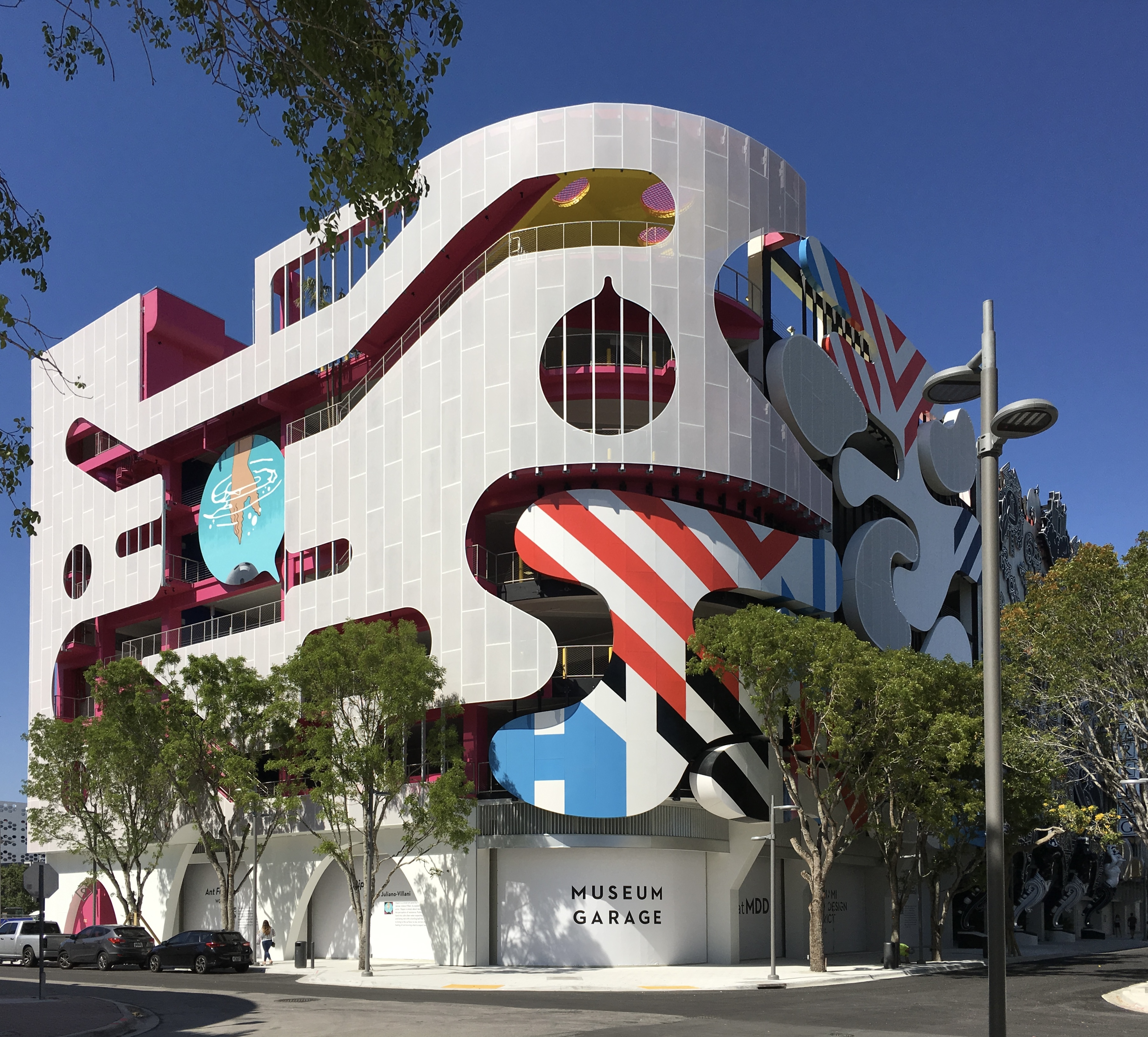
Miami Museum Garage, Miami, US, by WORKac, 2018

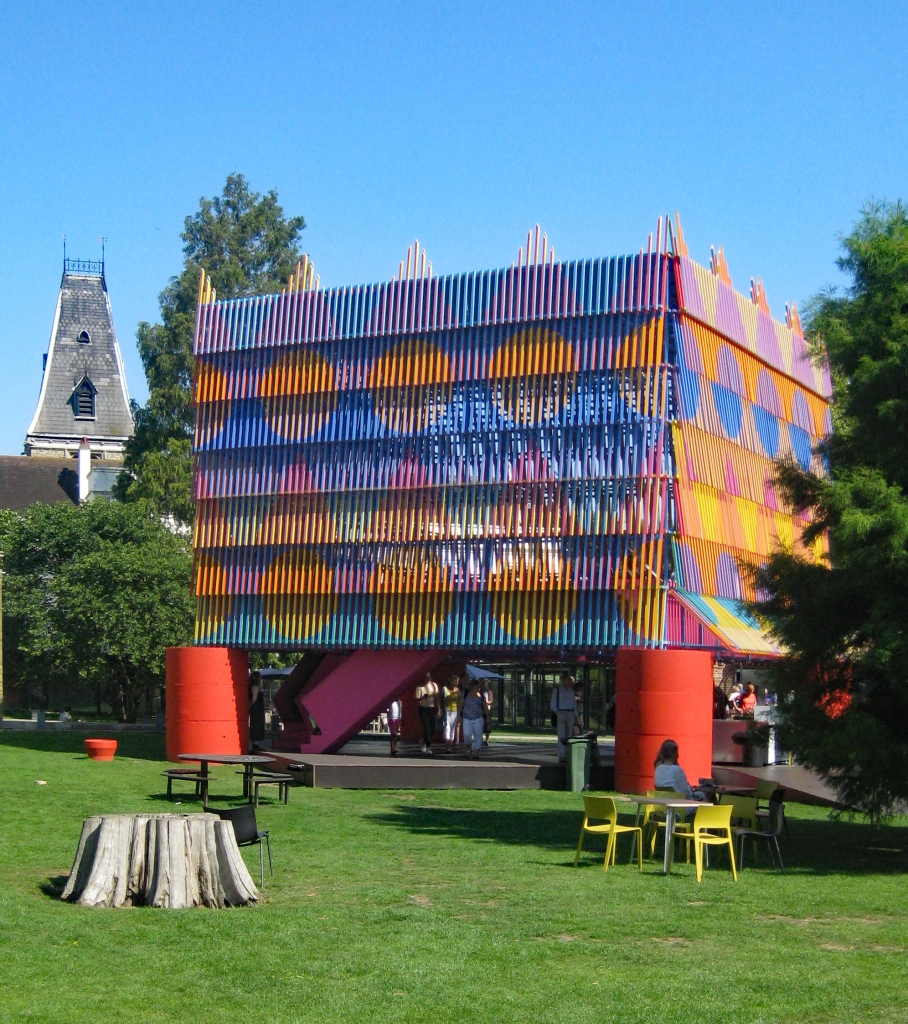
The Colour Palace, Dulwich Picture Gallery, London, by Pricegore and Yinka Ilori, 2019

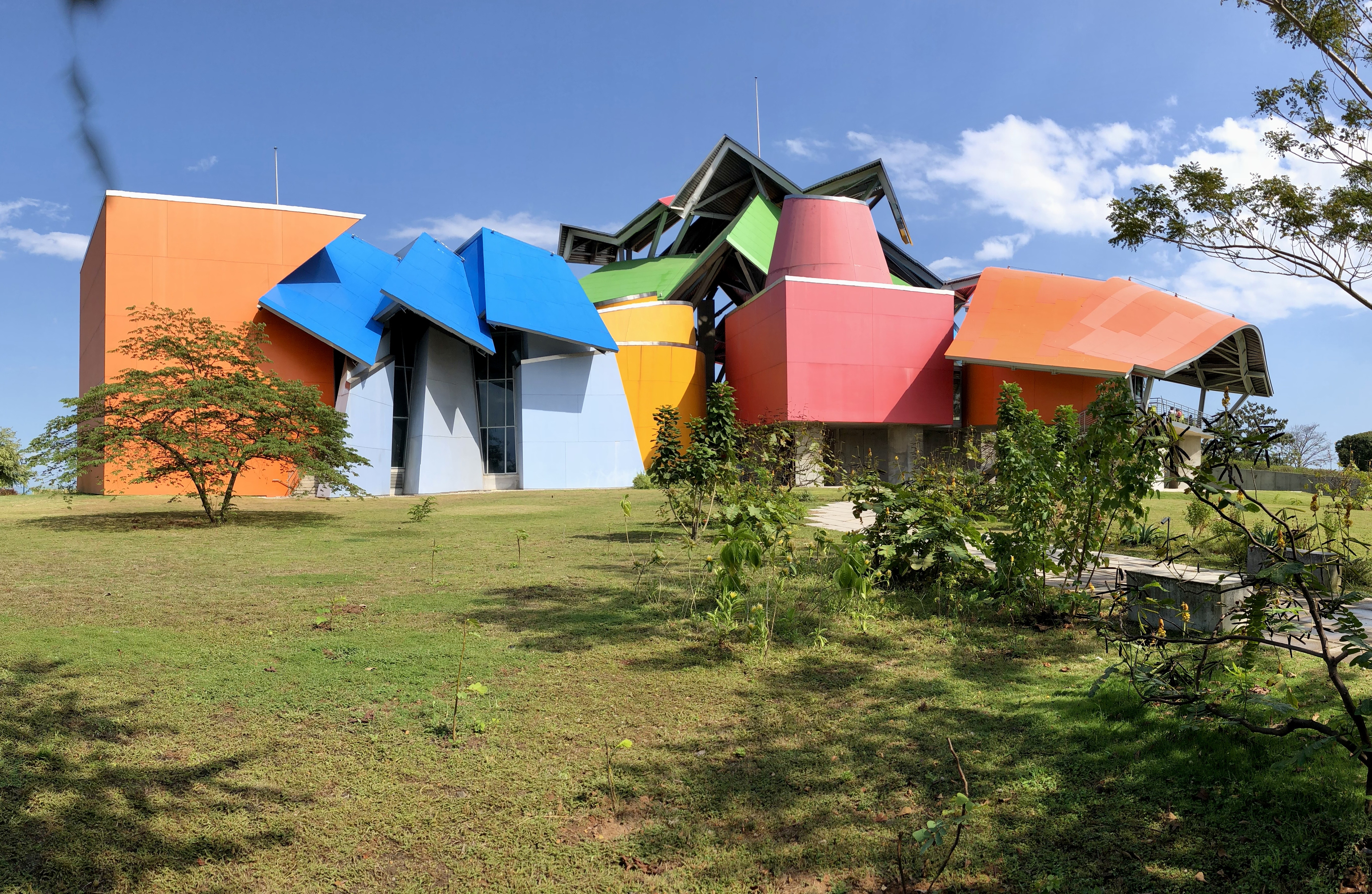
Biomuseo, Panama City, Panama, by Frank Gehry, partially opened in 2014, completed in 2019

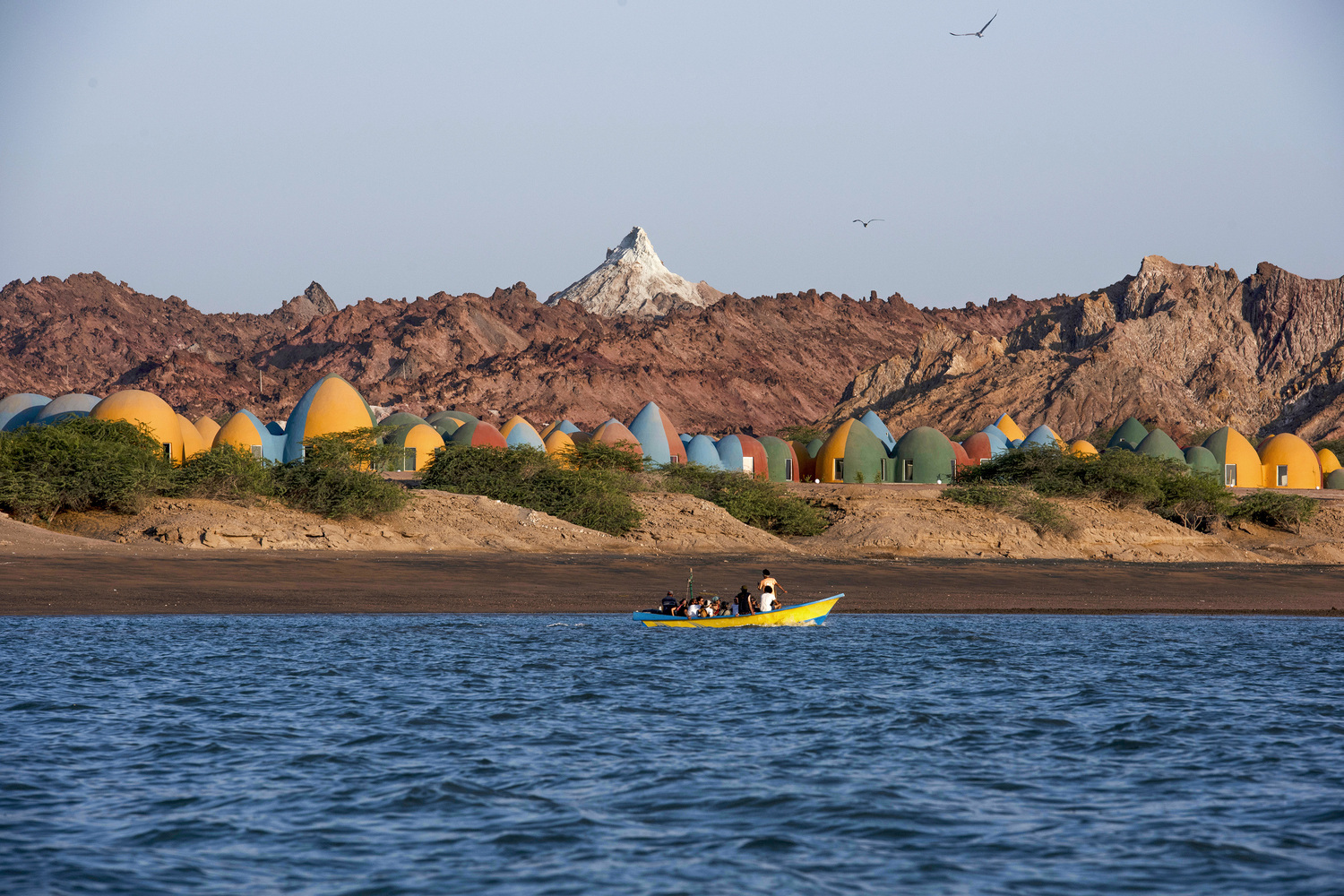
Presence in Hormoz 02, Hormoz Island, Hormozgan, Iran, by ZAV Architects, 2020

== Polychromatic light ==
The term polychromatic means having several colors. It is used to describe light that exhibits more than one color, which also means that it contains radiation of more than one wavelength. The study of polychromatics is particularly useful in the production of diffraction gratings.

== See also ==
- Encarnación Spanish form of polychrome sculpture
- Monochrome (opposite of polychrome)
