= D. aurea =

D. aurea may refer to:

- Dalbergia aurea, a legume species found only in Madagascar
- Diplommatina aurea, a land snail species endemic to Palau

== See also ==
- Aurea (disambiguation)
