= Ebano =

Ebano may refer to:

- Dalbergia funera, a species of legume found in El Salvador and Guatemala
- Ébano, San Luis Potosí, a town and municipality in Mexico
