= Dalbergia velutina =

Scientific classification
- Kingdom: Plantae
- Clade: Embryophytes
- Clade: Tracheophytes
- Clade: Angiosperms
- Clade: Eudicots
- Clade: Rosids
- Order: Fabales
- Family: Fabaceae
- Subfamily: Faboideae
- Genus: Dalbergia
- Species: D. velutina

Binomial name
- Dalbergia velutina Benth.

Synonyms
- Amerimnon stipulatum Kuntze; Dalbergia abbreviata Craib; Dalbergia pierreana Prain; Dalbergia velutina var. annamensis Niyomdham; Dalbergia velutina f. burmanica Thoth.

Species of legume

Dalbergia velutina (synonym D. pierreana) is a species of liana. The genus Dalbergia is placed in the subfamily Faboideae and tribe Dalbergieae.

The recorded range of this species is from Assam to southern China, Indochina and Peninsular Malaysia. In Vietnam it may be known under its synonym Dalbergia pierreana or trắc Pierre.

== Varieties ==
Plants of the World Online currently includes:

- Dalbergia velutina var. succirubra (Gagnep. & Craib) Niyomdham
- Dalbergia velutina var. verrucosa (Craib) Niyomdham (Thailand)
