= Dalbergia glaucocarpa =

Conservation status
- Vulnerable (IUCN 3.1)

Scientific classification
- Kingdom: Plantae
- Clade: Tracheophytes
- Clade: Angiosperms
- Clade: Eudicots
- Clade: Rosids
- Order: Fabales
- Family: Fabaceae
- Subfamily: Faboideae
- Genus: Dalbergia
- Species: D. glaucocarpa

Binomial name
- Dalbergia glaucocarpa Bosser & R.Rabev.

Species of legume

Dalbergia glaucocarpa is a species of legume in the family Fabaceae. It is a tree found only in Madagascar. It is threatened by habitat loss.
