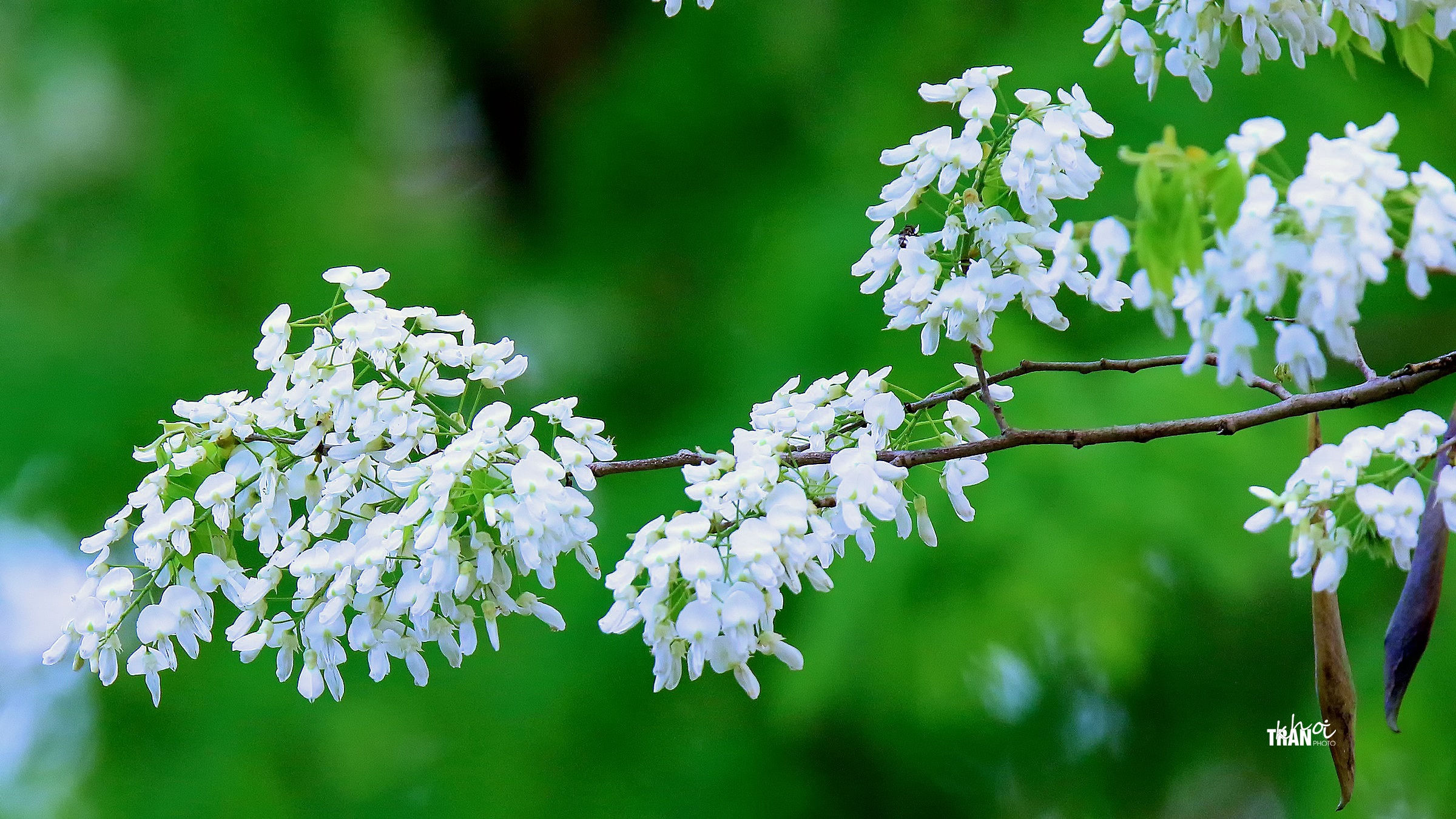

Conservation status
- Data Deficient (IUCN 2.3)

Scientific classification
- Kingdom: Plantae
- Clade: Embryophytes
- Clade: Tracheophytes
- Clade: Spermatophytes
- Clade: Angiosperms
- Clade: Eudicots
- Clade: Rosids
- Order: Fabales
- Family: Fabaceae
- Subfamily: Faboideae
- Genus: Dalbergia
- Species: D. boniana

Binomial name
- Dalbergia boniana Gagnep.

= Dalbergia boniana =

Species of legume

Dalbergia boniana is a species of legume in the family Fabaceae. It is found only in Vietnam.
