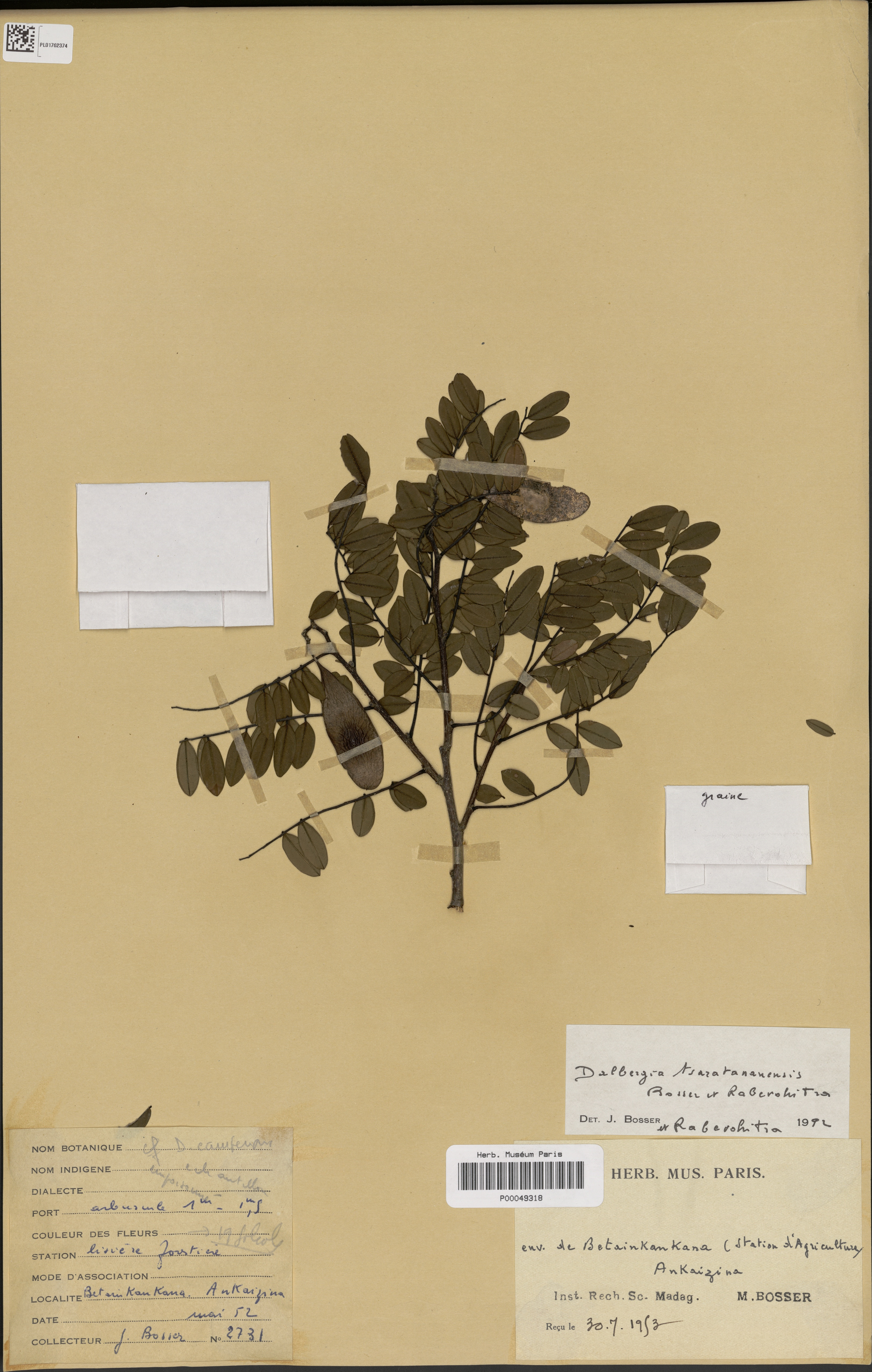

Conservation status
- Endangered (IUCN 3.1)

Scientific classification
- Kingdom: Plantae
- Clade: Tracheophytes
- Clade: Angiosperms
- Clade: Eudicots
- Clade: Rosids
- Order: Fabales
- Family: Fabaceae
- Subfamily: Faboideae
- Genus: Dalbergia
- Species: D. tsaratananensis

Binomial name
- Dalbergia tsaratananensis Bosser & R.Rabev.

= Dalbergia tsaratananensis =

Species of legume

Dalbergia tsaratananensis is a species of legume in the family Fabaceae. It is a shrub or tree native to north-central Madagascar. It is threatened by habitat loss.
