= Dalbergia setifera =

Conservation status
- Endangered (IUCN 2.3)

Scientific classification
- Kingdom: Plantae
- Clade: Tracheophytes
- Clade: Angiosperms
- Clade: Eudicots
- Clade: Rosids
- Order: Fabales
- Family: Fabaceae
- Subfamily: Faboideae
- Genus: Dalbergia
- Species: D. setifera

Binomial name
- Dalbergia setifera Hutch. & Dalziel

Species of legume

Dalbergia setifera is a low growing shrub in the family Fabaceae. It is found only in Ghana. It is threatened by habitat loss.
