= Dalbergia tsiandalana =

Conservation status
- Endangered (IUCN 3.1)

Scientific classification
- Kingdom: Plantae
- Clade: Tracheophytes
- Clade: Angiosperms
- Clade: Eudicots
- Clade: Rosids
- Order: Fabales
- Family: Fabaceae
- Subfamily: Faboideae
- Genus: Dalbergia
- Species: D. tsiandalana

Binomial name
- Dalbergia tsiandalana R.Vig.

Species of legume

Dalbergia tsiandalana is a species of legume in the family Fabaceae. It is a shrub endemic to Boeny in western Madagascar. It is threatened by habitat loss.

The species was described by René Viguier in 1952.
