= Dalbergia urschii =

Conservation status
- Endangered (IUCN 3.1)

Scientific classification
- Kingdom: Plantae
- Clade: Tracheophytes
- Clade: Angiosperms
- Clade: Eudicots
- Clade: Rosids
- Order: Fabales
- Family: Fabaceae
- Subfamily: Faboideae
- Genus: Dalbergia
- Species: D. urschii

Binomial name
- Dalbergia urschii Bosser & Rabevohitra.

Species of legume

Dalbergia urschii is a species of legume in the family Fabaceae. It is found only in Madagascar. Trees of dalbergia urschii are often harvested for lumber, due to the high quality and unique color of its wood.

The ICUN labels this species as threatened by habitat loss.

== Sources ==
- Du Puy, D. (1998). "Dalbergia urschii". IUCN Red List of Threatened Species. 1998 e.T38307A10109622. doi:10.2305/IUCN.UK.1998.RLTS.T38307A10109622.en.
