= Dalbergia hancei =

- In Hong Kong

Conservation status
- Least Concern (IUCN 3.1)

Scientific classification
- Kingdom: Plantae
- Clade: Tracheophytes
- Clade: Angiosperms
- Clade: Eudicots
- Clade: Rosids
- Order: Fabales
- Family: Fabaceae
- Subfamily: Faboideae
- Genus: Dalbergia
- Species: D. hancei

Binomial name
- Dalbergia hancei Benth.

Species of legume

Dalbergia hancei is a species of liana, with the Vietnamese name (dây) trắc Hance. The genus Dalbergia is placed in the subfamily Faboideae and tribe Dalbergieae; no subspecies are listed in the Catalogue of Life. The species is native to China and Vietnam.
