= Dalbergia junghuhnii =

Conservation status
- Least Concern (IUCN 3.1)

Scientific classification
- Kingdom: Plantae
- Clade: Tracheophytes
- Clade: Angiosperms
- Clade: Eudicots
- Clade: Rosids
- Order: Fabales
- Family: Fabaceae
- Subfamily: Faboideae
- Genus: Dalbergia
- Species: D. junghuhnii

Binomial name
- Dalbergia junghuhnii Benth.

Synonyms
- Amerimnon junghuhnii (Benth.) Kuntze; Dalbergia curtisii Prain; Dalbergia sennoides Blume ex Miq.; Dalbergia stercoracea Maingay ex Prain; Dalbergia subsympathetica Prain

Species of legume

Dalbergia junghuhnii (synonym D. curtisii), known locally as Akar Koompas, is a species of shrub placed in the subfamily Faboideae and tribe Dalbergieae; no subspecies are listed in the Catalogue of Life.

D. junghuhnii has a native range from Indochina to Malesia; the Vietnamese name (as its synonym D. curtisii) is ni rinh or trắc Curtis.
