= Dalbergia glomerata =

Conservation status
- Critically Endangered (IUCN 3.1)

Scientific classification
- Kingdom: Plantae
- Clade: Tracheophytes
- Clade: Angiosperms
- Clade: Eudicots
- Clade: Rosids
- Order: Fabales
- Family: Fabaceae
- Subfamily: Faboideae
- Genus: Dalbergia
- Species: D. glomerata

Binomial name
- Dalbergia glomerata Hemsl.

Synonyms
- Amerimnon glomeratum (Hemsl.) Standl.

Species of legume

Dalbergia glomerata is a species of legume in the family Fabaceae. It is found only in Mexico.
