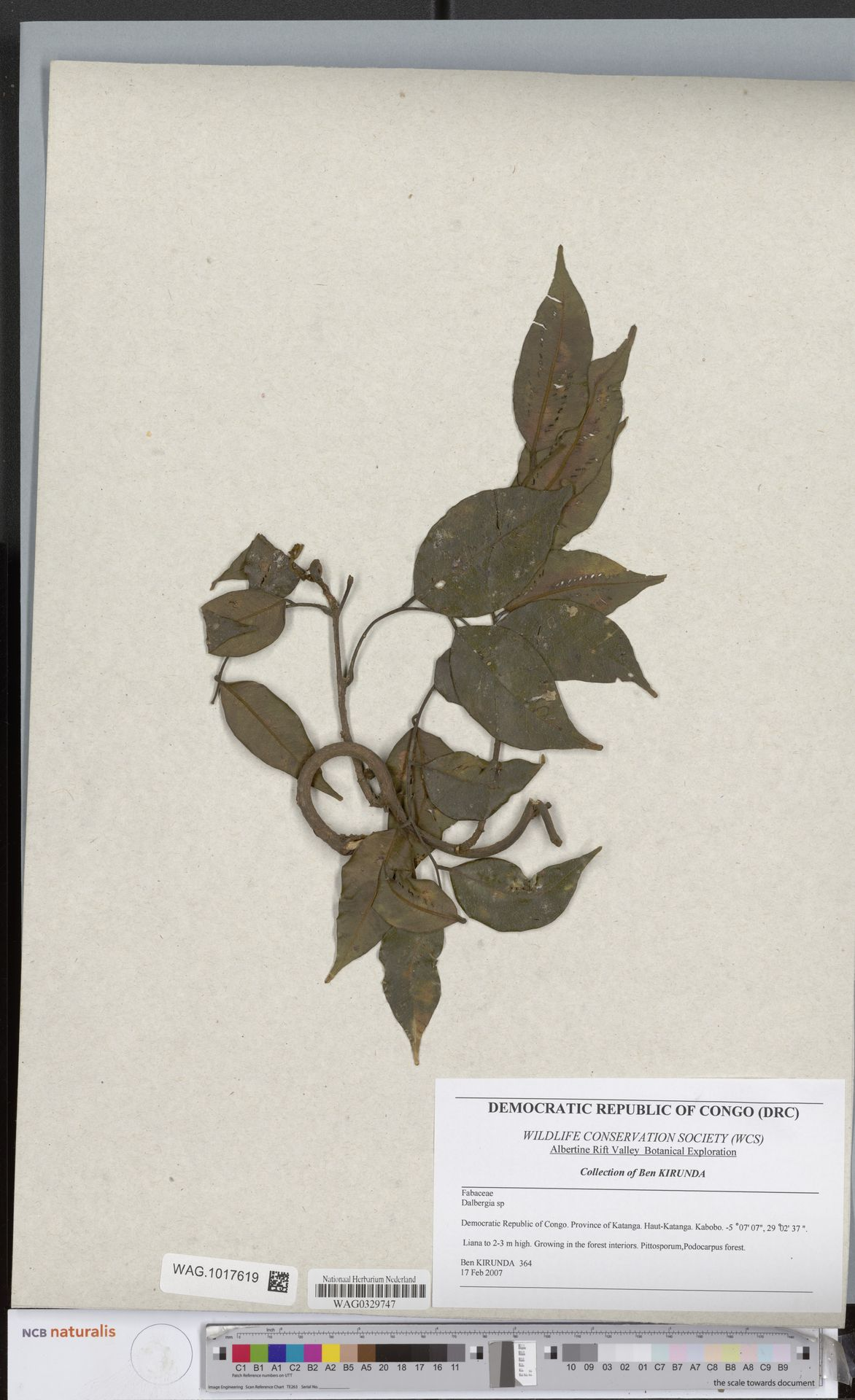

Conservation status
- Least Concern (IUCN 3.1)

Scientific classification
- Kingdom: Plantae
- Clade: Tracheophytes
- Clade: Angiosperms
- Clade: Eudicots
- Clade: Rosids
- Order: Fabales
- Family: Fabaceae
- Subfamily: Faboideae
- Genus: Dalbergia
- Species: D. oligophylla

Binomial name
- Dalbergia oligophylla Baker ex Hutch. & Dalziel

= Dalbergia oligophylla =

Species of plant

Dalbergia oligophylla is a species of legume in the family Fabaceae. It is a shrub native to Guinea and Sierra Leone in West Africa, and to Nigeria, Cameroon, Bioko, and Gabon in west-central Africa. It is naturalized in parts of the Caroline Islands.

In Bioko, Cameroon, and Nigeria the species grows at submontane and montane forest edges from (900–) 1,500–2,000 metres elevation. Elsewhere the species grows in more diverse habitats from mangrove forest edges to riverine, montane, and degraded forests as low as 80 metres elevation.
