= Dalbergia greveana =

Conservation status
- Vulnerable (IUCN 3.1)

Scientific classification
- Kingdom: Plantae
- Clade: Tracheophytes
- Clade: Angiosperms
- Clade: Eudicots
- Clade: Rosids
- Order: Fabales
- Family: Fabaceae
- Subfamily: Faboideae
- Genus: Dalbergia
- Species: D. greveana

Binomial name
- Dalbergia greveana Baill.

Synonyms
- Dalbergia ambongoensis Baill.; Dalbergia eurybothrya Drake; Dalbergia ikopensis Jum.; Dalbergia isaloensis R.Vig.; Dalbergia myriabotrys Baker; Dalbergia perrieri Jum.

Species of legume

Dalbergia greveana is a species of legume in the family Fabaceae.

It is found only in Madagascar and is threatened by habitat loss.
