= Dalbergia humbertii =

Conservation status
- Vulnerable (IUCN 3.1)

Scientific classification
- Kingdom: Plantae
- Clade: Tracheophytes
- Clade: Angiosperms
- Clade: Eudicots
- Clade: Rosids
- Order: Fabales
- Family: Fabaceae
- Subfamily: Faboideae
- Genus: Dalbergia
- Species: D. humbertii

Binomial name
- Dalbergia humbertii R.Vig.

Species of legume

Dalbergia humbertii is a species of legume in the family Fabaceae. It is a tree native to northern Madagascar, including the Bemaraha Massif.
