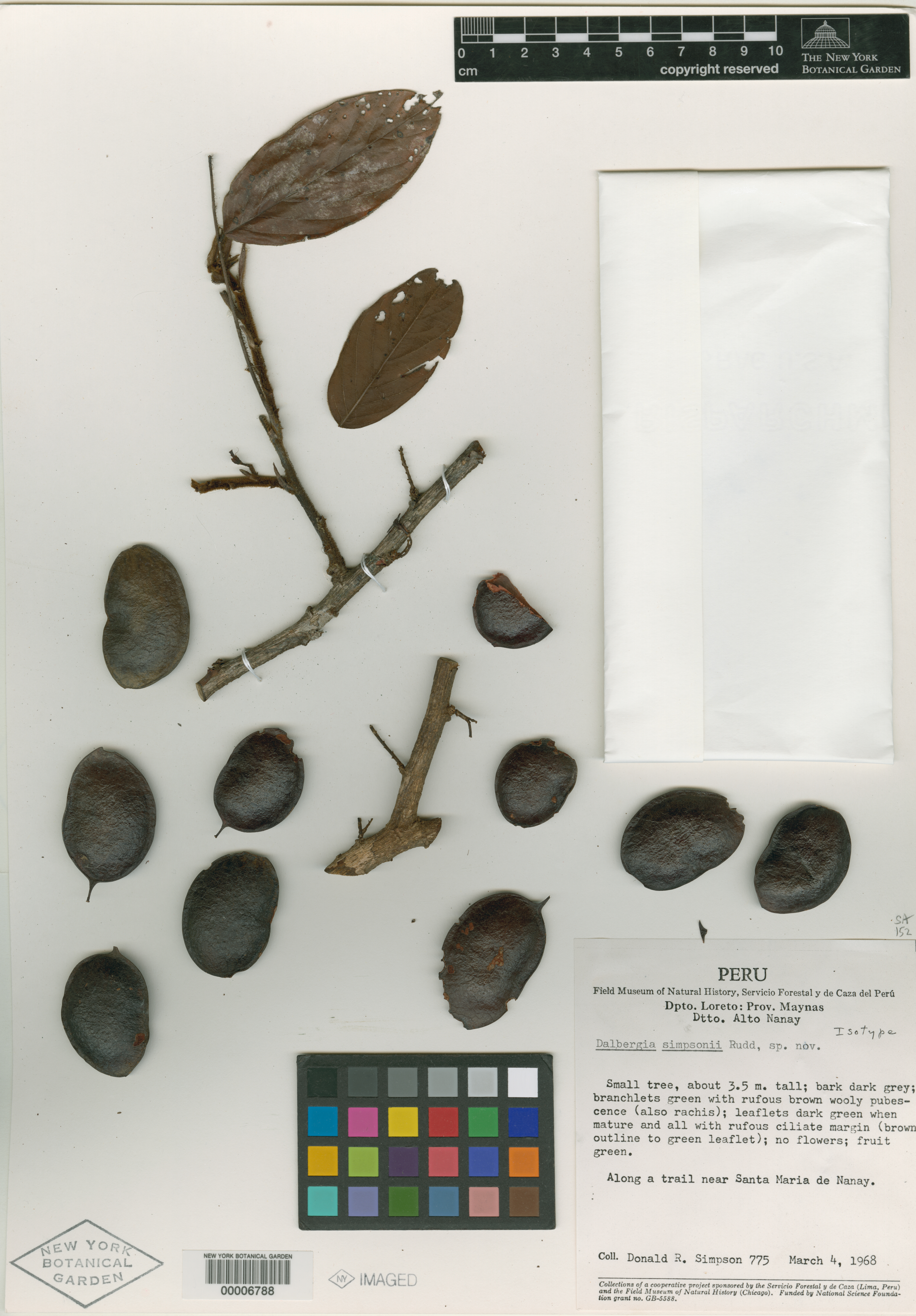

Conservation status
- Vulnerable (IUCN 2.3)

Scientific classification
- Kingdom: Plantae
- Clade: Tracheophytes
- Clade: Angiosperms
- Clade: Eudicots
- Clade: Rosids
- Order: Fabales
- Family: Fabaceae
- Subfamily: Faboideae
- Genus: Dalbergia
- Species: D. simpsonii

Binomial name
- Dalbergia simpsonii Rudd

= Dalbergia simpsonii =

Species of plant

Dalbergia simpsonii is a species of legume in the family Fabaceae. It is found only in Peru.
