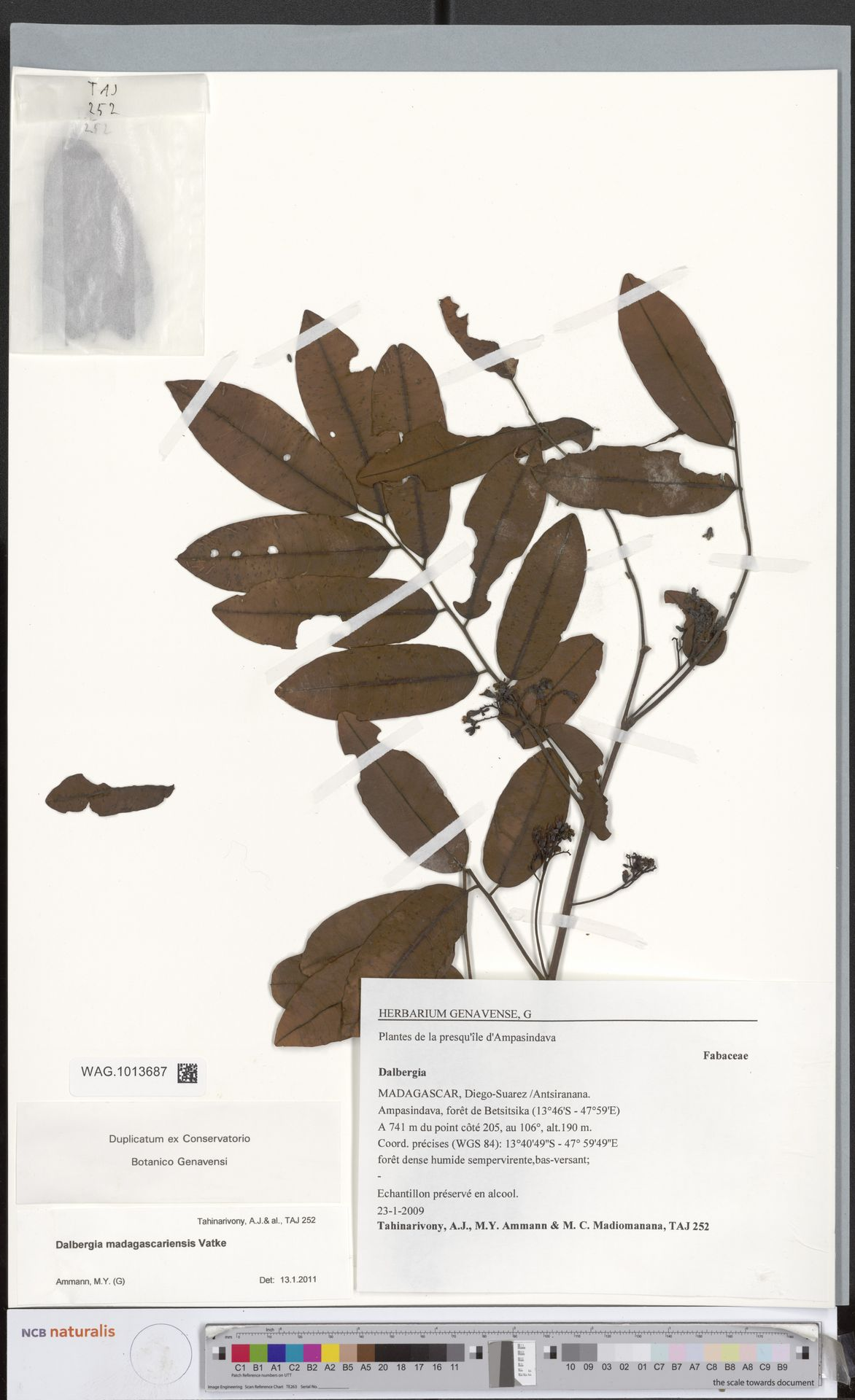

Conservation status
- Vulnerable (IUCN 3.1)

Scientific classification
- Kingdom: Plantae
- Clade: Tracheophytes
- Clade: Angiosperms
- Clade: Eudicots
- Clade: Rosids
- Order: Fabales
- Family: Fabaceae
- Subfamily: Faboideae
- Genus: Dalbergia
- Species: D. madagascariensis

Binomial name
- Dalbergia madagascariensis Vatke.

= Dalbergia madagascariensis =

Species of legume

Dalbergia madagascariensis is a species of legume in the family Fabaceae. It is found only in Madagascar. It is threatened by habitat loss.
