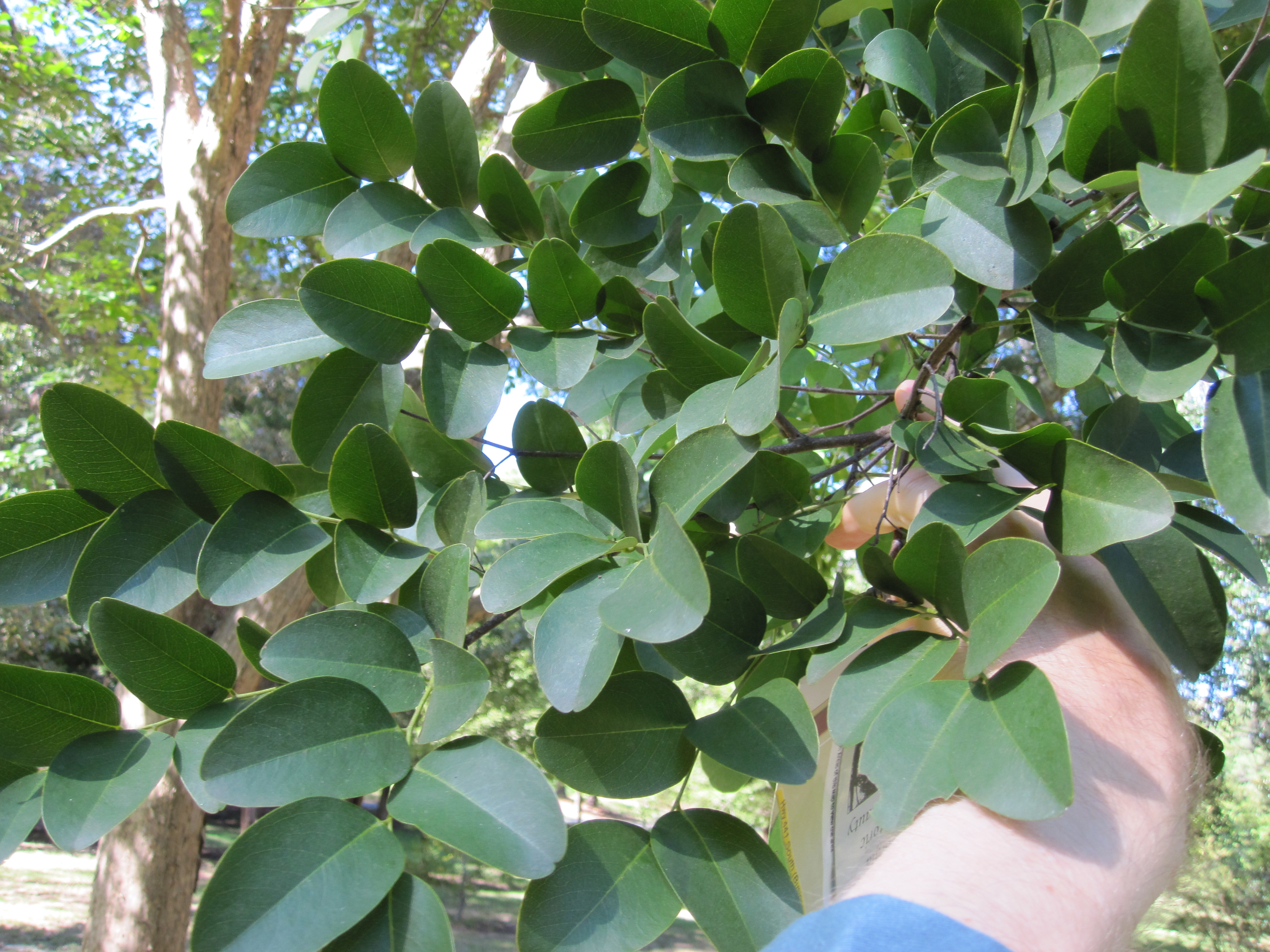
- Leaves
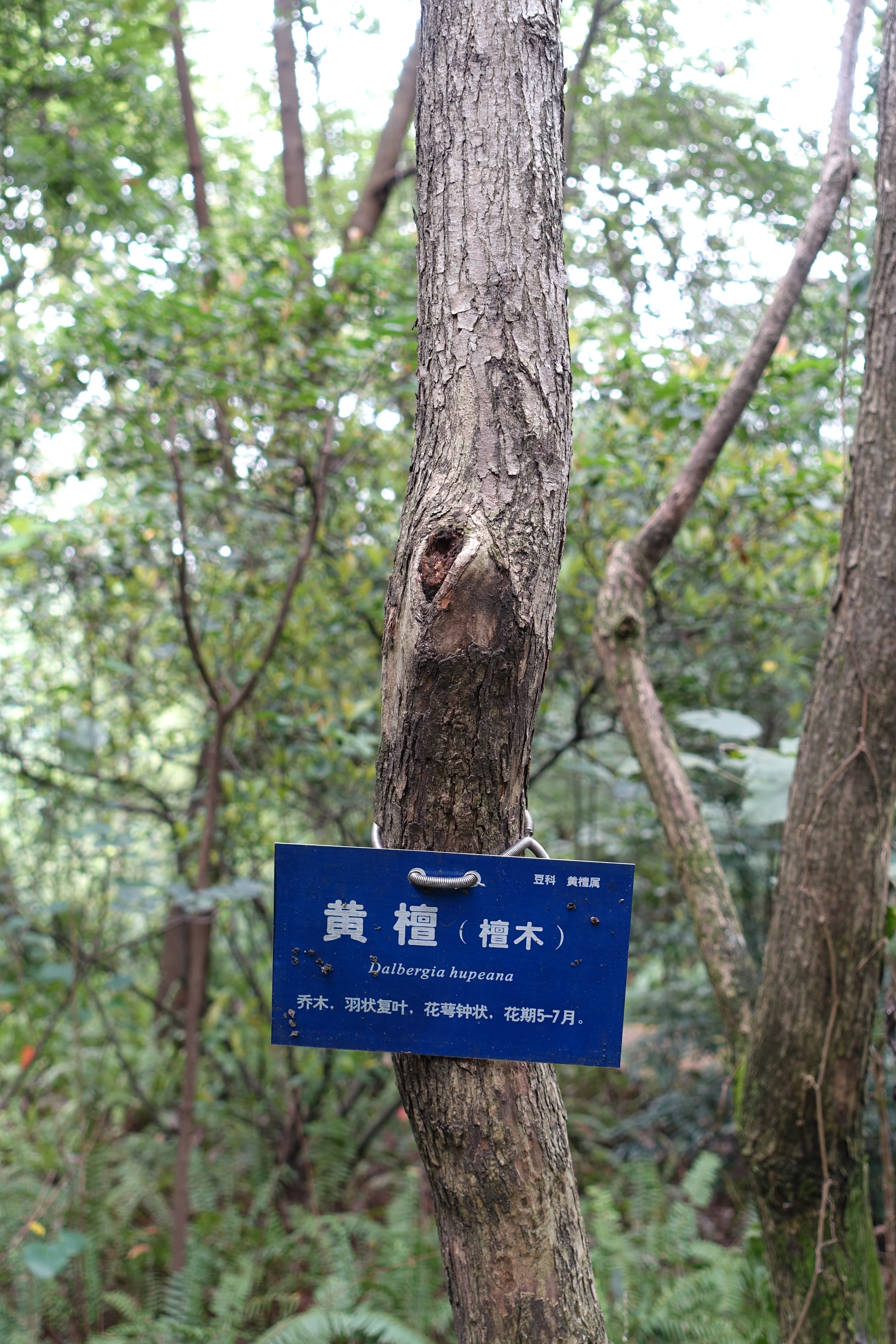
- Bark

Conservation status
- Least Concern (IUCN 3.1)

Scientific classification
- Kingdom: Plantae
- Clade: Tracheophytes
- Clade: Angiosperms
- Clade: Eudicots
- Clade: Rosids
- Order: Fabales
- Family: Fabaceae
- Subfamily: Faboideae
- Genus: Dalbergia
- Species: D. hupeana

Binomial name
- Dalbergia hupeana Hance

Synonyms
- Dalbergia hupeana var. bauhiniifolia Pamp.; Dalbergia sacerdotum Prain

= Dalbergia hupeana =

Species of plant in the legume family

Dalbergia hupeana, the hardy rosewood, is a species of flowering plant in the family Fabaceae, native to subtropical areas of Laos, Vietnam, southern and central China, and southwestern South Korea. In the wild it prefers to grow on forested or scrubby slopes.

A tree reaching 20 m (66 ft) with high heterozygosity, it is of economic significance as its wood is considered precious. It is used as a street tree in a number of southern Chinese cities.
