= Dalbergia suaresensis =

Conservation status
- Endangered (IUCN 3.1)

Scientific classification
- Kingdom: Plantae
- Clade: Tracheophytes
- Clade: Angiosperms
- Clade: Eudicots
- Clade: Rosids
- Order: Fabales
- Family: Fabaceae
- Subfamily: Faboideae
- Genus: Dalbergia
- Species: D. suaresensis

Binomial name
- Dalbergia suaresensis Baill.

Synonyms
- Dalbergia bernieri Baill.

Species of legume

Dalbergia suaresensis is a species of legume in the family Fabaceae. It is a tree endemic to Madagascar. The IUCN Red List assesses the plant's conservation status as Endangered, and its continued existence on this planet is threatened by habitat loss.

The species was described by Henri Ernest Baillon in 1884.
