= Dalbergia intibucana =

Conservation status
- Vulnerable (IUCN 3.1)

Scientific classification
- Kingdom: Plantae
- Clade: Tracheophytes
- Clade: Angiosperms
- Clade: Eudicots
- Clade: Rosids
- Order: Fabales
- Family: Fabaceae
- Subfamily: Faboideae
- Genus: Dalbergia
- Species: D. intibucana

Binomial name
- Dalbergia intibucana Standley & L.O. Williams

Species of legume

Dalbergia intibucana is a species of legume in the family Fabaceae. It is found only in Honduras.

== Sources ==
- Nelson, C. (1998). "Dalbergia intibucana". The IUCN Red List of Threatened Species. 1998. IUCN: e.T30701A9571426. doi:10.2305/IUCN.UK.1998.RLTS.T30701A9571426.en.
