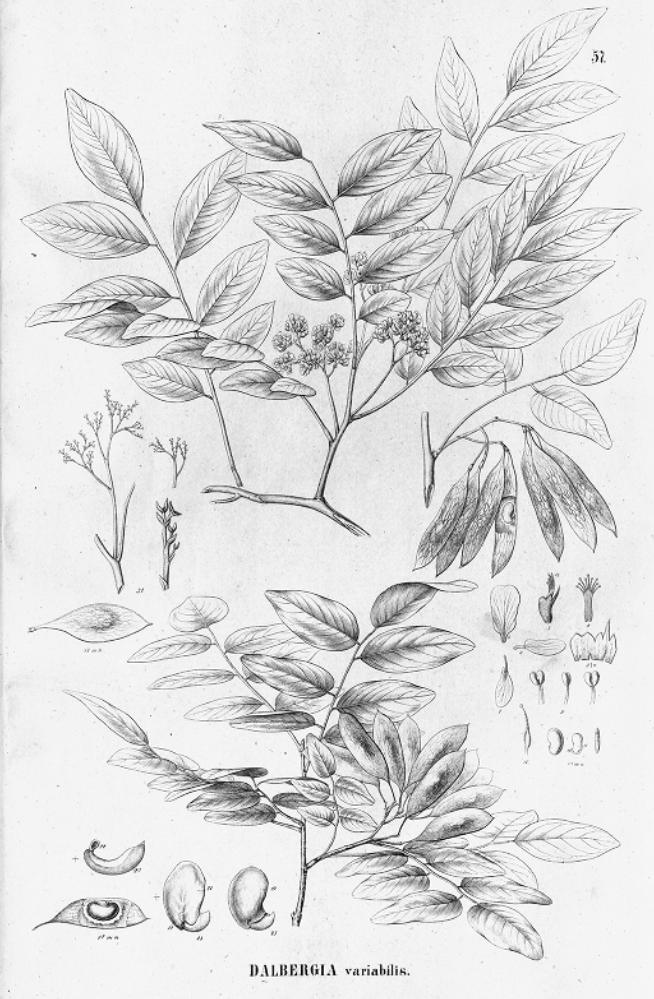

Conservation status
- Least Concern (IUCN 3.1)

Scientific classification
- Kingdom: Plantae
- Clade: Tracheophytes
- Clade: Angiosperms
- Clade: Eudicots
- Clade: Rosids
- Order: Fabales
- Family: Fabaceae
- Subfamily: Faboideae
- Genus: Dalbergia
- Species: D. frutescens

Binomial name
- Dalbergia frutescens (Vell.) Britton

Synonyms
- Dalbergia variabilis Vogel; Pterocarpus frutescens Vell.; Triptolemea glabra Benth.; Triptolemea latifolia Benth.; Triptolemea montana Benth.; Triptolemea montana Mart.; Triptolemea ovata Benth.; Triptolemea pauciflora Benth.; Triptolemea platycarpa Benth.

= Dalbergia frutescens =

Species of legume

Dalbergia frutescens is a species of shrub distributed along the Atlantic coast of South America. Its habit is variable, usually being a liana.

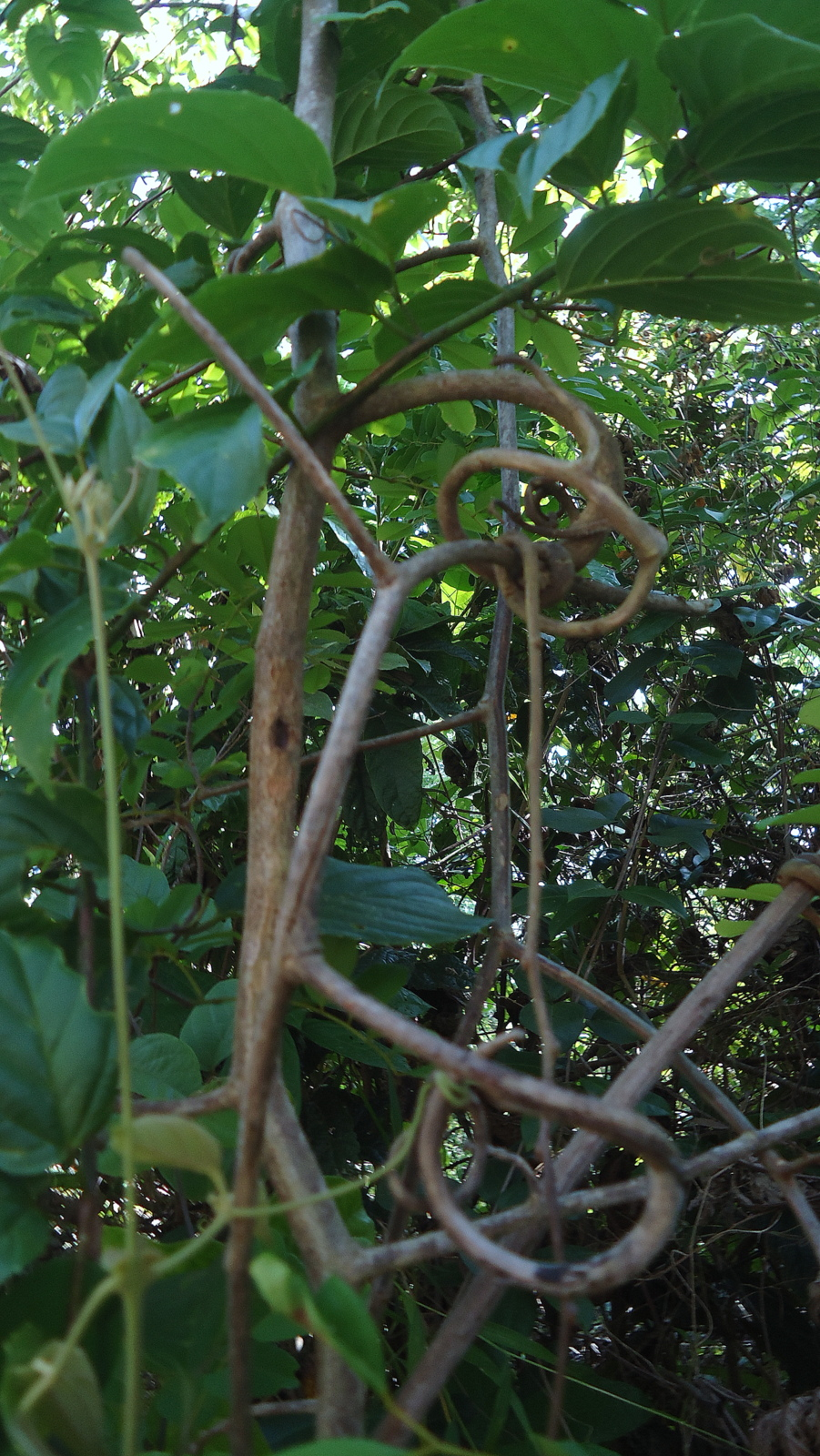

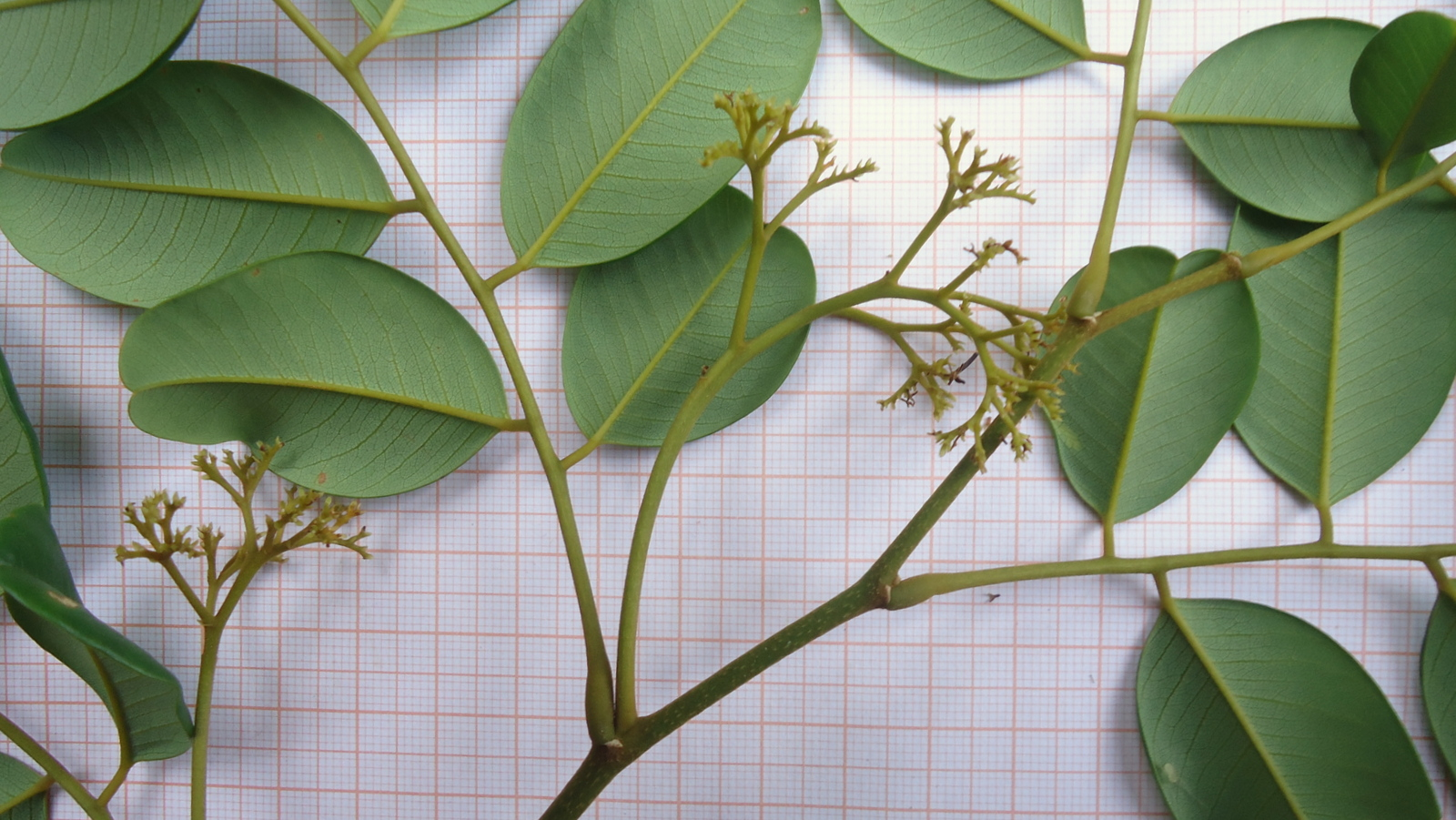
