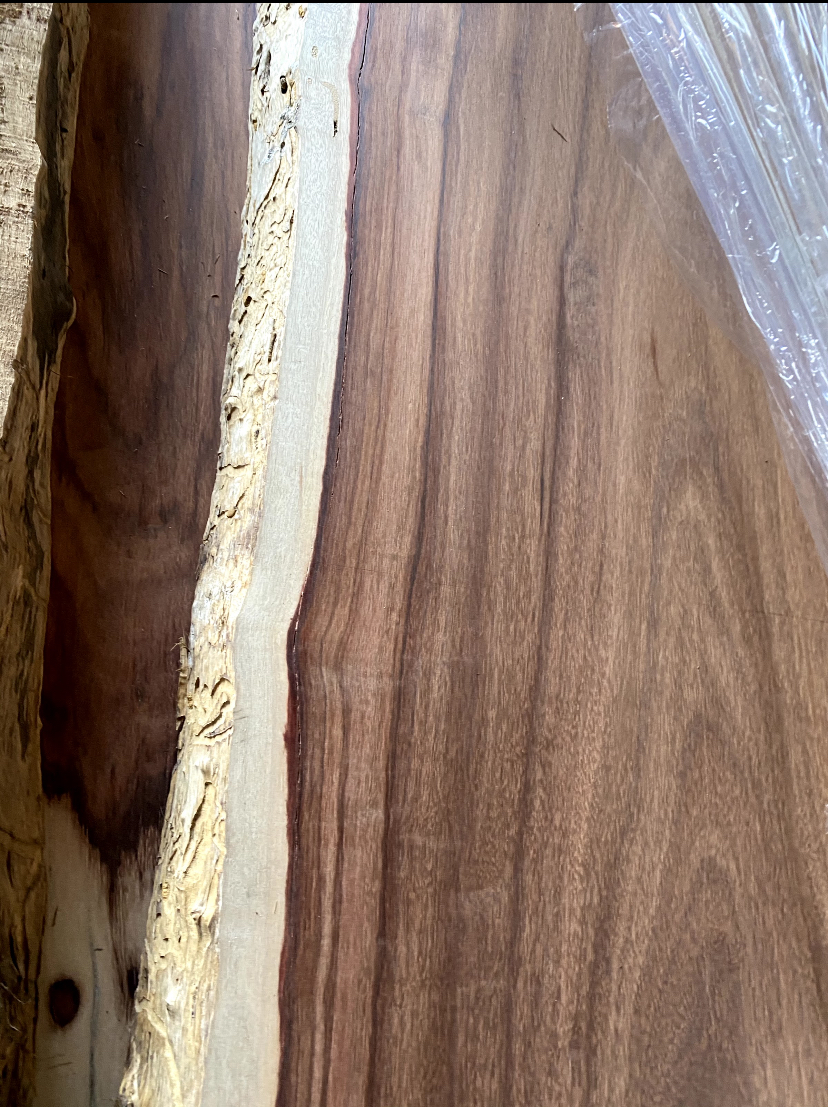
- The heartwood, a high value rosewood, with a light gray strip of sapwood

Conservation status
- Critically Endangered (IUCN 3.1)

Scientific classification
- Kingdom: Plantae
- Clade: Tracheophytes
- Clade: Angiosperms
- Clade: Eudicots
- Clade: Rosids
- Order: Fabales
- Family: Fabaceae
- Subfamily: Faboideae
- Genus: Dalbergia
- Species: D. granadillo

Binomial name
- Dalbergia granadillo Pittier

Synonyms
- Amerimnon granadillo (Pittier) Standl.

= Dalbergia granadillo =

Species of plant in the legume family

Dalbergia granadillo, the granadillo (a name it shares with a number of other plants) or zangalicua, is a species of flowering plant in the family Fabaceae, native to central and southern Mexico, and El Salvador. A slow-growing tree reaching 20 m (66 ft), it is listed as Critically Endangered due to illegal logging of mature individuals.
