= Dalbergia eremicola =

Conservation status
- Near Threatened (IUCN 3.1)

Scientific classification
- Kingdom: Plantae
- Clade: Tracheophytes
- Clade: Angiosperms
- Clade: Eudicots
- Clade: Rosids
- Order: Fabales
- Family: Fabaceae
- Subfamily: Faboideae
- Genus: Dalbergia
- Species: D. eremicola

Binomial name
- Dalbergia eremicola Polh.

Species of legume

Dalbergia eremicola is a species of legume in the family Fabaceae. It is found in Kenya and Somalia.
