= Dalbergia entadoides =

Conservation status
- Data Deficient (IUCN 2.3)

Scientific classification
- Kingdom: Plantae
- Clade: Embryophytes
- Clade: Tracheophytes
- Clade: Spermatophytes
- Clade: Angiosperms
- Clade: Eudicots
- Clade: Rosids
- Order: Fabales
- Family: Fabaceae
- Subfamily: Faboideae
- Genus: Dalbergia
- Species: D. entadoides

Binomial name
- Dalbergia entadoides Pierre ex Gagnep.

Species of legume

Dalbergia entadoides is a species of liana (sometimes self-supporting), found in Cambodia, Laos, Thailand and Vietnam: with the Vietnamese name trắc bàm. The genus Dalbergia is placed in the subfamily Faboideae and tribe Dalbergieae; no subspecies are listed in the Catalogue of Life.
