= Dalbergia bracteolata =

Conservation status
- Least Concern (IUCN 3.1)

Scientific classification
- Kingdom: Plantae
- Clade: Tracheophytes
- Clade: Angiosperms
- Clade: Eudicots
- Clade: Rosids
- Order: Fabales
- Family: Fabaceae
- Subfamily: Faboideae
- Genus: Dalbergia
- Species: D. bracteolata

Binomial name
- Dalbergia bracteolata Bak.

Synonyms
- Dalbergia goetzei Harms; Dalbergia grandidieri Baill.; Dalbergia richardii Baill.

Species of legume

Dalbergia bracteolata is a species of legume in the family Fabaceae. It is found in Kenya, Madagascar, Mozambique, and Tanzania. It is threatened by habitat loss.
