= Dalbergia yunnanensis =

Scientific classification
- Kingdom: Plantae
- Clade: Tracheophytes
- Clade: Angiosperms
- Clade: Eudicots
- Clade: Rosids
- Order: Fabales
- Family: Fabaceae
- Subfamily: Faboideae
- Genus: Dalbergia
- Species: D. yunnanensis

Binomial name
- Dalbergia yunnanensis Franch.

Species of legume

Dalbergia yunnanensis is a plant species of the genus Dalbergia: which is placed in the subfamily Faboideae and tribe Dalbergieae.

== Subspecies ==
The Catalogue of Life lists:

- D. yunnanensis var. collettii (Prain) Thoth.
- D. yunnanensis var. yunnanensis Franch.
