= Dalbergia spinosa =

Scientific classification
- Kingdom: Plantae
- Clade: Embryophytes
- Clade: Tracheophytes
- Clade: Spermatophytes
- Clade: Angiosperms
- Clade: Eudicots
- Clade: Rosids
- Order: Fabales
- Family: Fabaceae
- Subfamily: Faboideae
- Genus: Dalbergia
- Species: D. spinosa

Binomial name
- Dalbergia spinosa Roxb.

Synonyms
- Dalbergia horrida Graham; Dalbergia vietnamensis P.H.Hô & Niyomdham; Drepanocarpus spinosus (Roxb.)Kurz; Amerimnum spinosum (Roxb.)Kuntze; Amerimnum horsidum Dennst. Amerimnon spinosum (Roxb.)Kuntze

Species of legume

Dalbergia spinosa is a species of thorny liana (or self-supporting tree to 15 m), with the Vietnamese name trắc gai. The genus Dalbergia is placed in the subfamily Faboideae and tribe Dalbergieae; no subspecies are listed in the Catalogue of Life.
