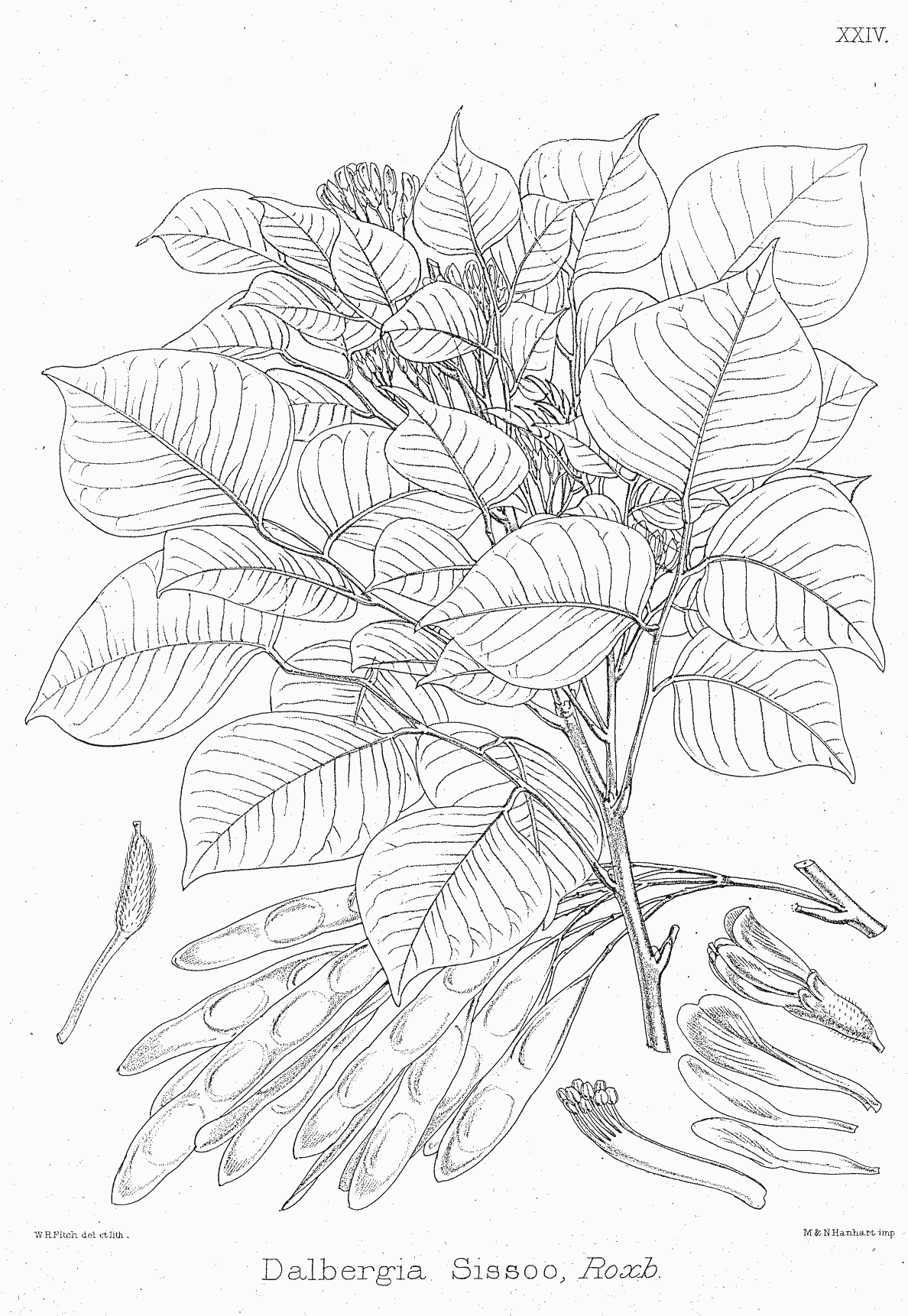
- Sissoo or Indian rosewood (Dalbergia sissoo)

Scientific classification
- Kingdom: Plantae
- Clade: Tracheophytes
- Clade: Angiosperms
- Clade: Eudicots
- Clade: Rosids
- Order: Fabales
- Family: Fabaceae
- Subfamily: Faboideae
- Tribe: Dalbergieae
- Genus: Dalbergia; L.f.

Species
- 275; see text.

Synonyms
- Acouba Aubl.; Amerimnon P.Browne; Coroya Pierre; Ecastaphyllum P.Browne; Miscolobium Vogel; Triptolemea Mart.

= Dalbergia =

Genus of legumes

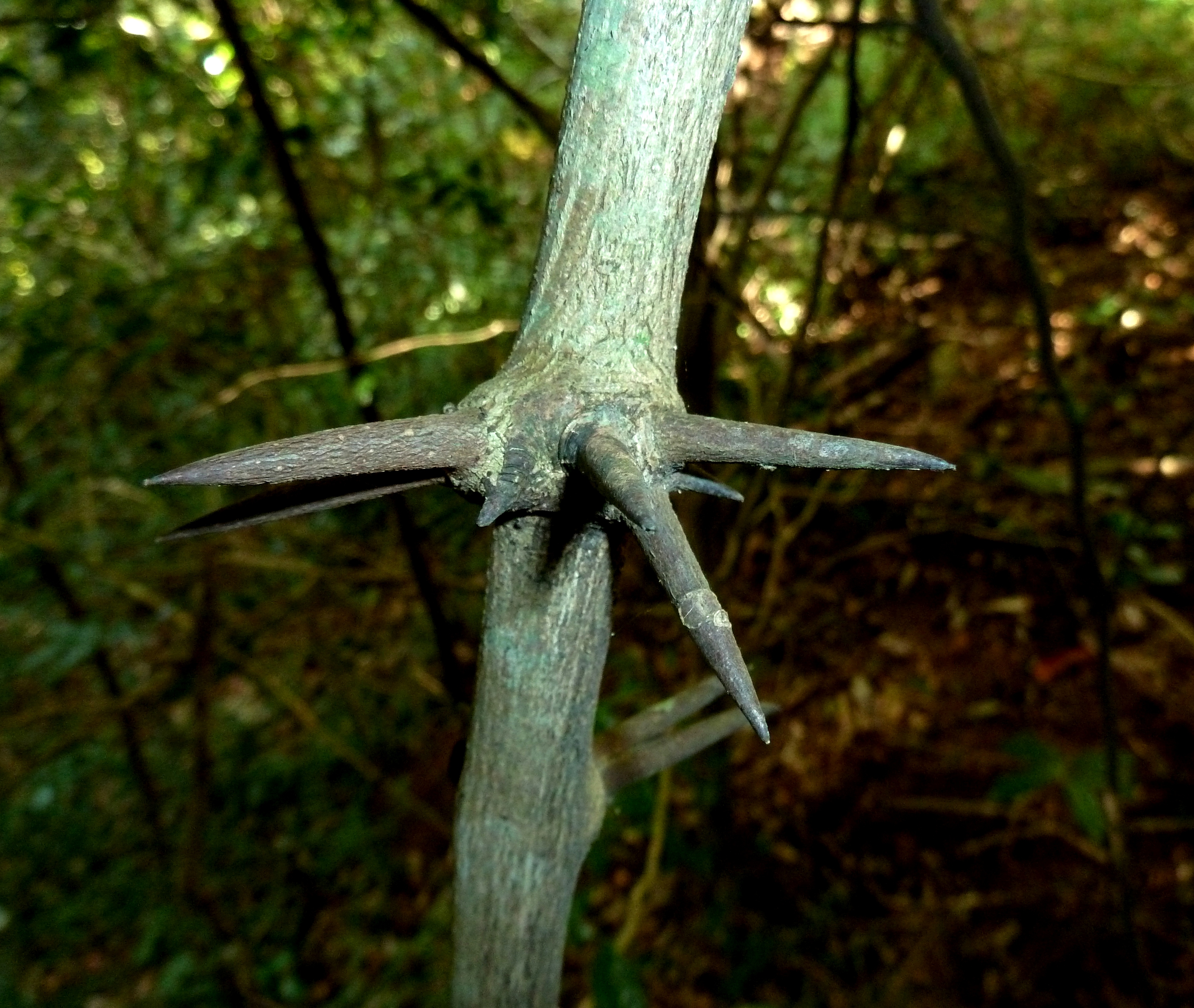
Spines of D. armata

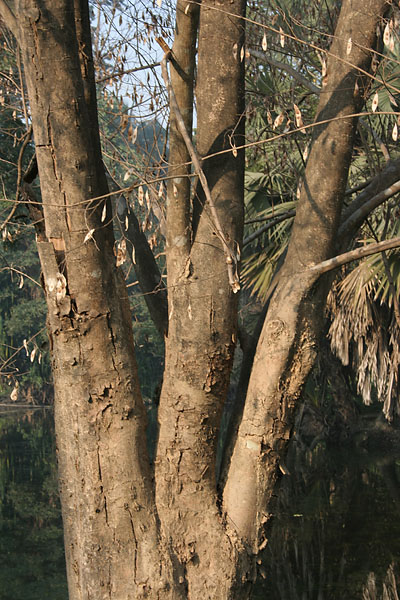
Trunk of D. lanceolaria

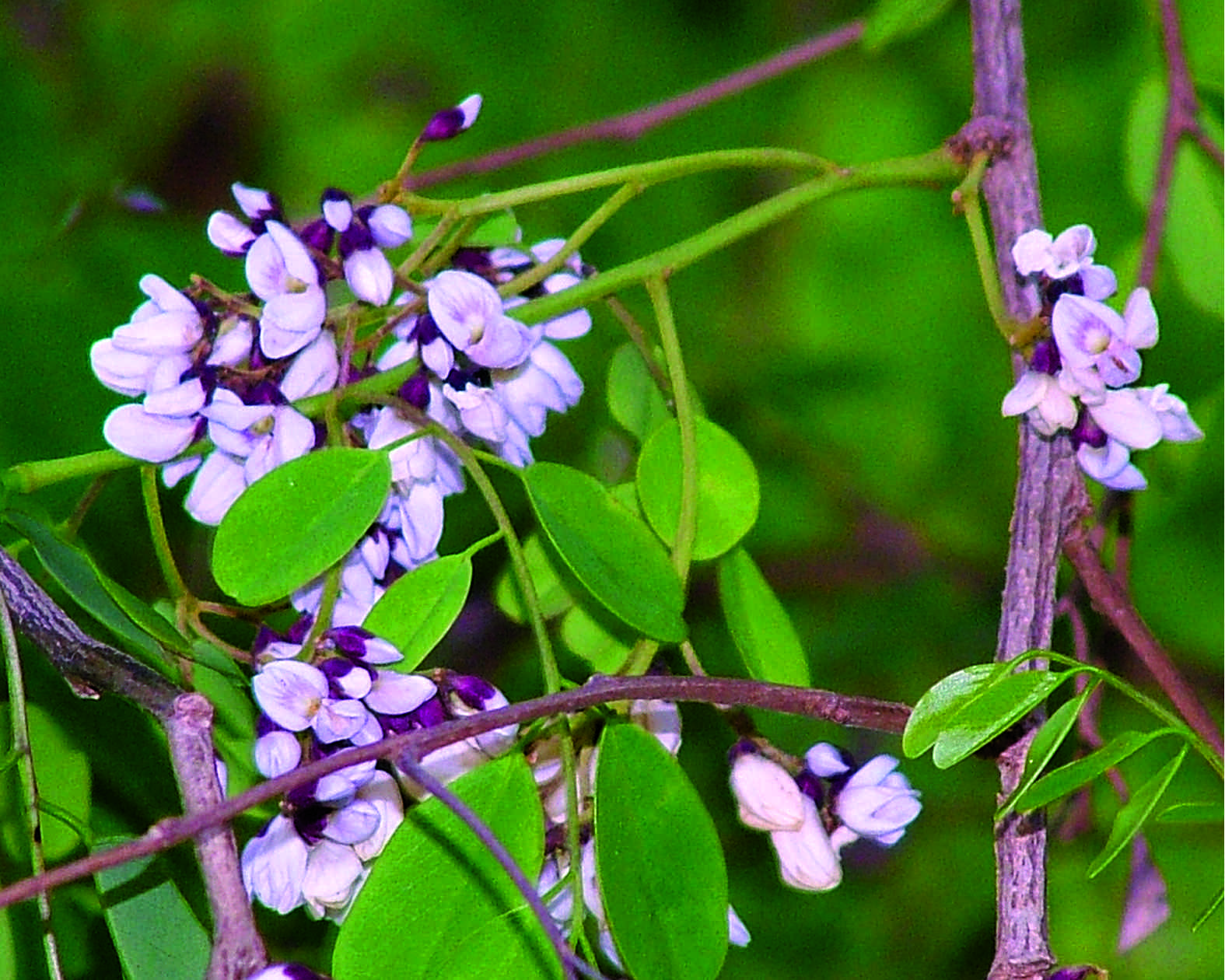
Flowers of D. lanceolaria

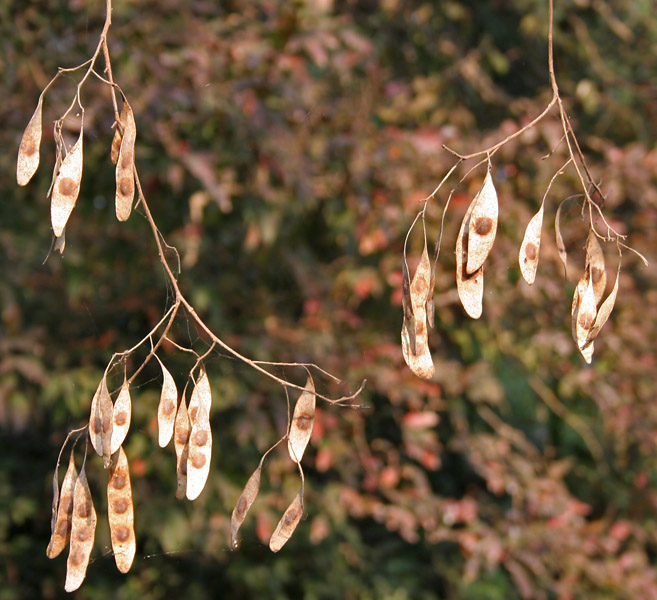
Pods of D. lanceolaria

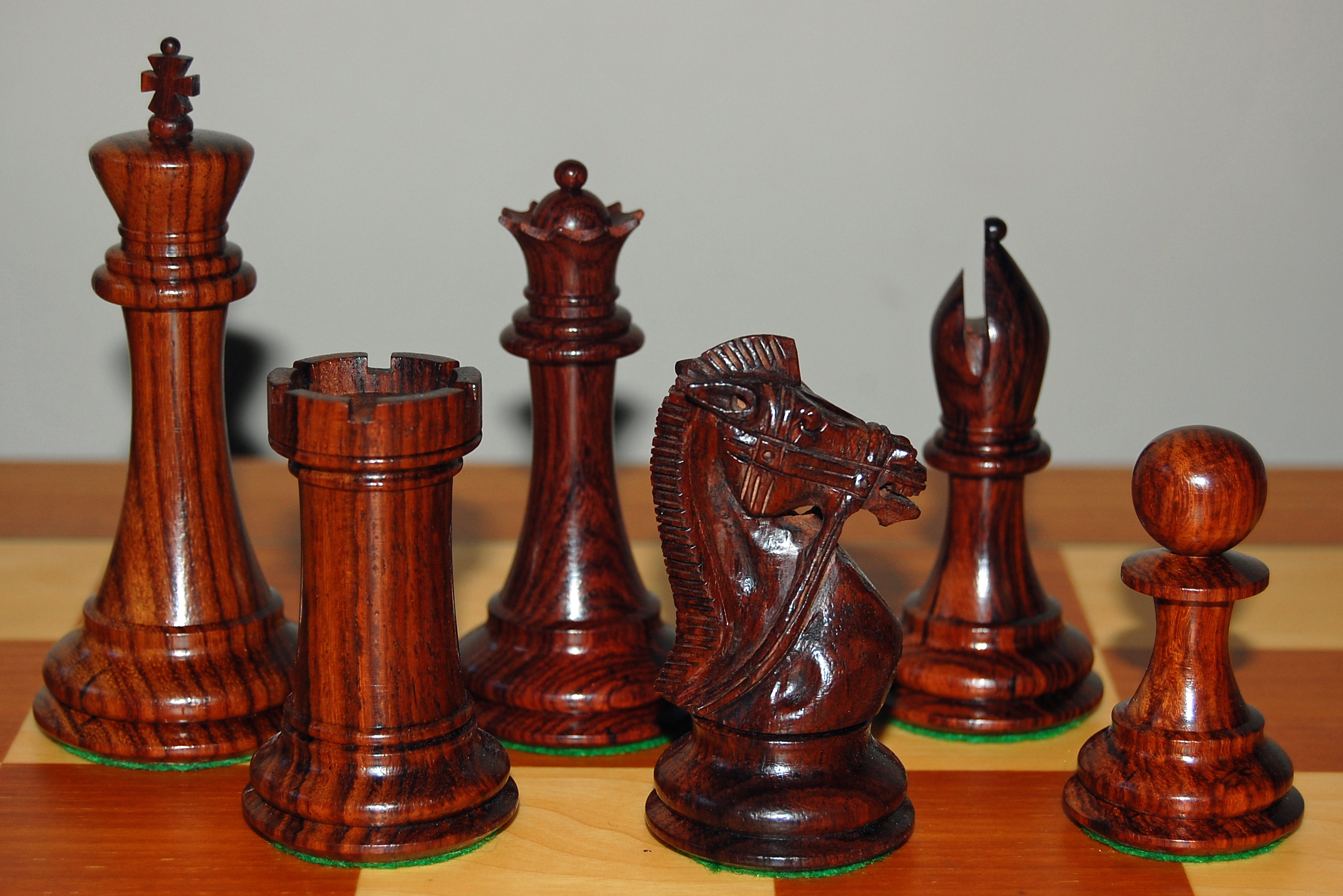
Chess pieces in D. latifolia rosewood

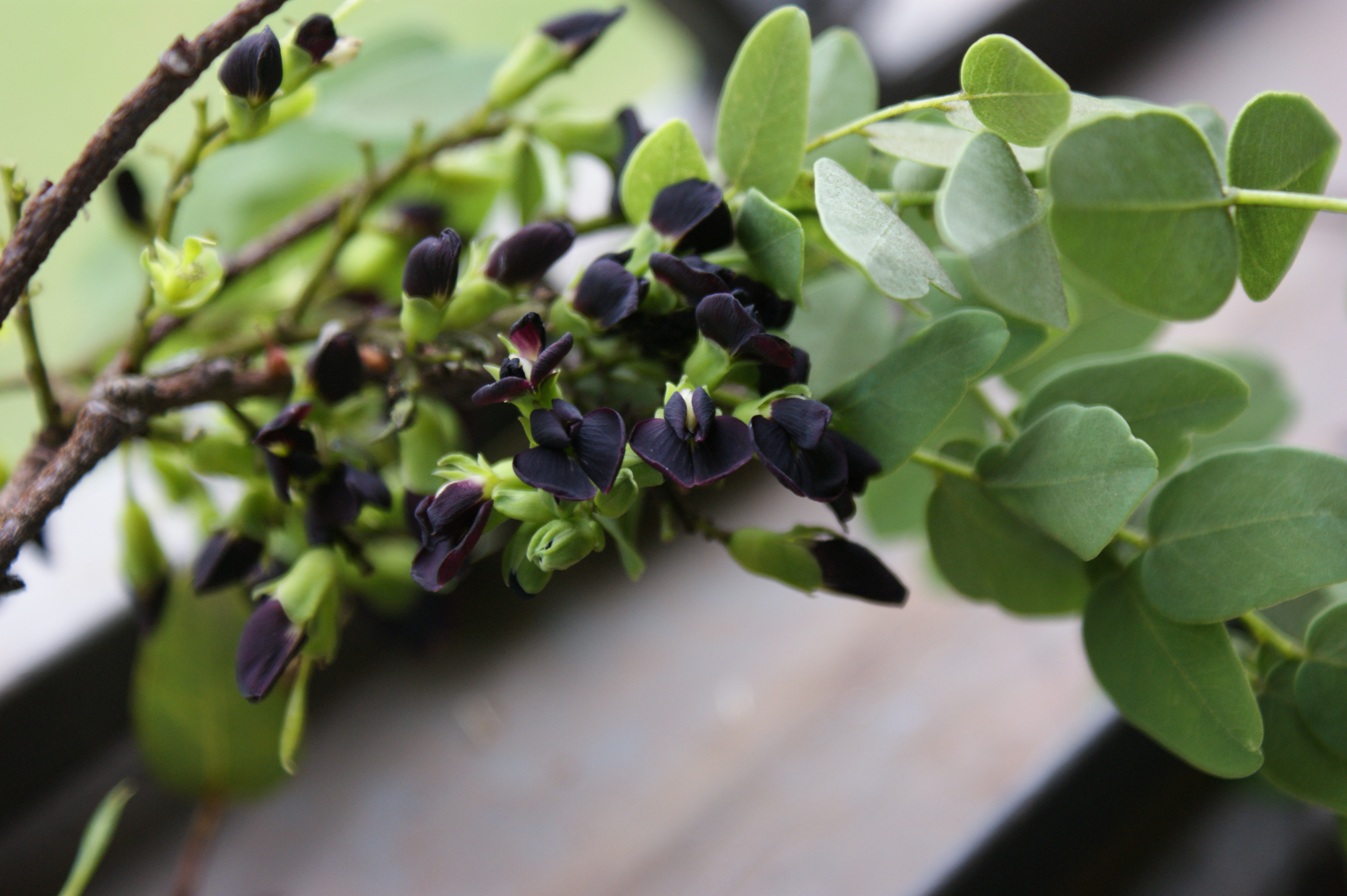
Flowers of D. miscolobium

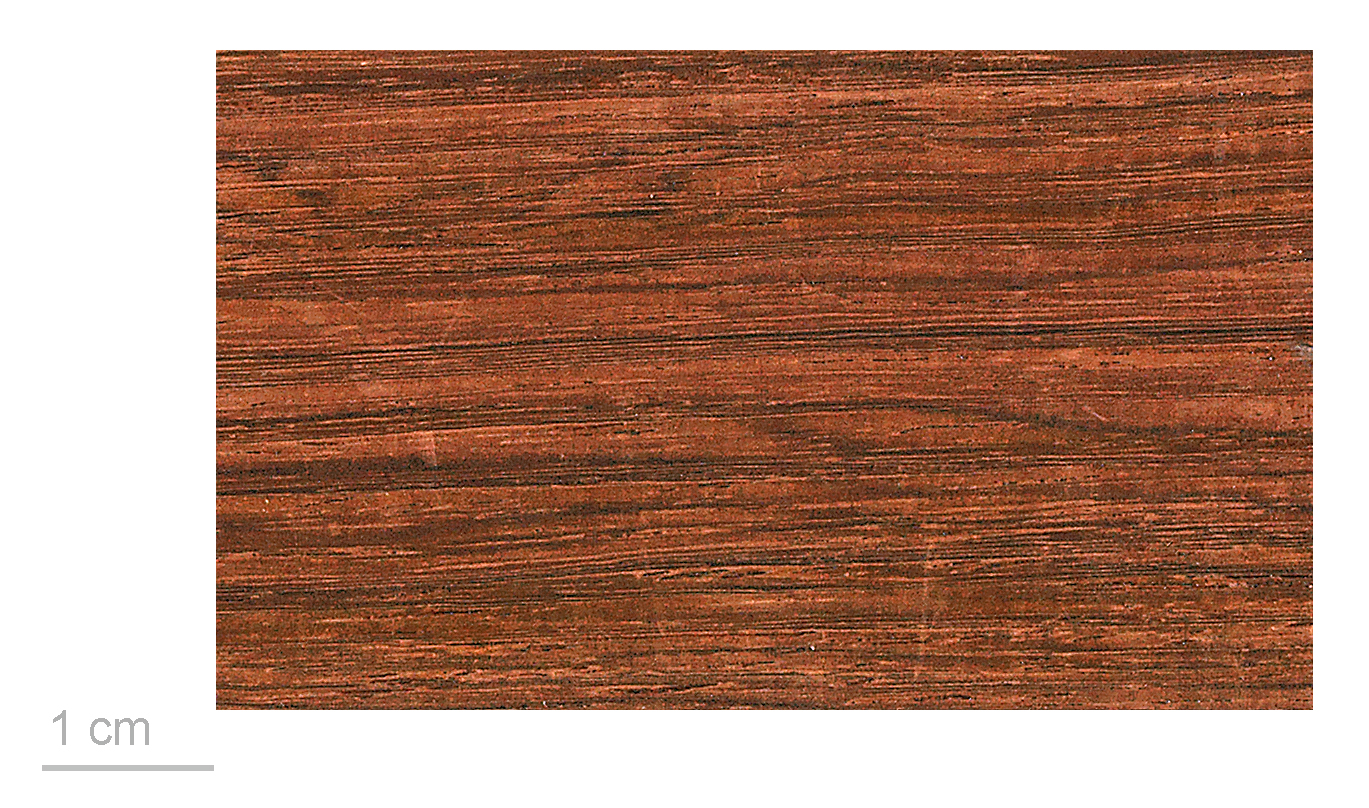
Wood from a Dalbergia sp. - MHNT

Dalbergia is a large genus of small to medium-size trees, shrubs and lianas in the pea family, Fabaceae, subfamily Faboideae. It was recently assigned to the informal monophyletic Dalbergia clade (or tribe): the Dalbergieae. The genus has a wide distribution, native to the tropical regions of Central and South America, Africa, Madagascar and Southern Asia.

== Fossil record ==
A fossil †Dalbergia phleboptera seed pod has been found in a Chattian deposit, in the municipality of Aix-en-Provence in France. Fossils of †Dalbergia nostratum have been found in rhyodacite tuff of Lower Miocene age in Southern Slovakia near the town of Lučenec. Fossil seed pods of †Dalbergia mecsekense have been found in a Sarmatian deposit in Hungary. †Dalbergia lucida fossils have been described from the Xiaolongtan Formation of late Miocene age in Kaiyuan County, Yunnan Province, China.

== Uses ==
Many species of Dalbergia are important timber trees, valued for their decorative and often fragrant wood, rich in aromatic oils. The most famous of these are the rosewoods, so-named because of the smell of the timber when cut, but several other valuable woods are yielded by the genus.

Species such as Dalbergia nigra known as Rio, Bahia, Brazilian rosewood, palisander de Rio Grande, or jacaranda and Dalbergia latifolia known as (East) Indian Rosewood or Sonokeling have been heavily used in furniture and musical instruments, given their colour and grain. Several East Asian species are important materials in traditional Chinese furniture.

The (Brazilian) tulipwood (D. decipularis) is cream coloured with red or salmon stripes. It is most often used in crossbanding and other veneers; it should not be confused with the "tulipwood" of the American tulip tree Liriodendron tulipifera, used in inexpensive cabinetwork.

The similarly used (but purple with darker stripes), and also Brazilian, kingwood is yielded by D. cearensis. Both are smallish to medium-sized trees, to 10 m. Another notable timber is cocobolo, mainly from D. retusa, a Central American timber with spectacular decorative orange red figure on freshly cut surfaces which slowly fades in air to more subdued tones and hues.

Dalbergia sissoo (Indian rosewood) is primarily used for furniture in northern India. Its export is highly regulated due to recent high rates of tree death due to unknown causes. Dalbergia sissoo has historically been the primary rosewood species of northern India. This wood is strong and tough, with color golden to dark brown. It is extremely durable and handsome, and it maintains its shape well. It can be easily seasoned. It is difficult to work, but it takes a fine polish. It is used for high quality furniture, plywoods, bridge piles, sporting goods, and railway sleepers. It is a very good material for decorative work and carvings. Its density is 770 kg/m^{3}.

African blackwood (D. melanoxylon) is an intensely black wood in demand for making woodwind musical instruments.

Dalbergia species are used as food plants by the larvae of some Lepidoptera species including Bucculatrix mendax which feeds exclusively on Dalbergia sissoo.

The Dalbergia species are notorious for causing allergic reactions due to the presence of sensitizing quinones in the wood.

== Conservation ==
All Dalbergia species are protected under the Convention on International Trade in Endangered Species of Wild Fauna and Flora (CITES). All but Dalbergia nigra are listed in Appendix II, with D.nigra listed in Appendix I.

== Species ==
Dalbergia comprises the following species:

- Dalbergia abbreviata Craib
- Dalbergia abrahamii Bosser & R. Rabev.
- Dalbergia acariiantha Harms
- Dalbergia acuta Benth.
- Dalbergia acutifoliolata Mendonca & Sousa
- Dalbergia adami Berhaut
- Dalbergia afzeliana G. Don
- Dalbergia ajudana Harms
- Dalbergia albertisii Prain
- Dalbergia albiflora Hutch. & Dalziel
  - subsp. albiflora Hutch. & Dalziel
  - subsp. echinocarpa Hepper
- Dalbergia altissima Baker f.
- Dalbergia altissima Pittier
- Dalbergia amazonica (Radlk.) Ducke
- Dalbergia andapensis Bosser & R. Rabev.
- Dalbergia antsirananae Phillipson, Crameri & N.Wilding
- Dalbergia arbutifolia Baker
- Dalbergia armata E. Mey. — Hluhluwe creeper
- Dalbergia assamica Benth.
- Dalbergia aurea Bosser & R. Rabev.
- Dalbergia bakeri Baker
- Dalbergia balansae Prain
- Dalbergia baronii Baker — Madagascar rosewood, Palisander rosewood, Palissandre voamboana
- Dalbergia bathiei R. Vig.
- Dalbergia beccarii Prain
- Dalbergia beddomei Thoth.
- Dalbergia benthamii Prain
- Dalbergia bignonae Berhaut
- Dalbergia bintuluensis Sunarno & Ohashi
- Dalbergia boehmii Taub.
- Dalbergia bojeri Drake
- Dalbergia boniana Gagnep.
- Dalbergia borneensis Prain
- Dalbergia brachystachya Bosser & R. Rabev.
- Dalbergia bracteolata Baker
- Dalbergia brasiliensis Vogel
- Dalbergia brownei (Jacq.) Urb. — Coin vine
- Dalbergia burmanica Prain
- Dalbergia calderonii Standl.
  - subsp. calderonii Standl.
  - subsp. molinae Rudd
- Dalbergia calycina Benth.
- Dalbergia campenonii Drake
- Dalbergia cana Kurz
- Dalbergia candenatensis (Dennst.) Prain
- Dalbergia canescens (Elmer) Merr.
- Dalbergia capuronii Bosser & R. Rabev.
- Dalbergia carringtoniana Sousa
- Dalbergia catingicola Harms
- Dalbergia caudata G. Don
- Dalbergia cearensis Ducke — Kingwood
- Dalbergia chapelieri Baill.
- Dalbergia chlorocarpa R. Vig.
- Dalbergia chontalensis Standl. & L.O. Williams
- Dalbergia clarkei Thoth.
- Dalbergia cochinchinensis Pierre ex Laness. — Siamese rosewood, Thailand rosewood, Tracwood (synonym Dalbergia cambodiana Pierre)
- Dalbergia commiphoroides Baker f.
- Dalbergia confertiflora Benth.
- Dalbergia congensis Baker f.
- Dalbergia congesta Wight & Arn.
- Dalbergia congestiflora Pittier
- Dalbergia coromandeliana Prain
- Dalbergia crispa Hepper
- Dalbergia cubilquitzensis (Donn. Sm.) Pittier
- Dalbergia cucullata Pittier
- Dalbergia cuiabensis Benth.
- Dalbergia cultrata Benth.
- Dalbergia cumingiana Benth.
- Dalbergia curtisii Prain
- Dalbergia cuscatlanica (Standl.) Standl.
- Dalbergia dalzielii Hutch. & Dalziel
- Dalbergia darienensis Rudd
- Dalbergia davidii Bosser & R. Rabev.
- Dalbergia debilis J.F. Macbr.
- Dalbergia decipularis Rizzini & A. Mattos — Tulipwood
- Dalbergia delphinensis Bosser & R. Rabev.
- Dalbergia densa Benth.
- Dalbergia densiflora (Benth.) Benth.
- Dalbergia discolor Blume
- Dalbergia duarensis Thoth.
- Dalbergia dyeriana Harms
- Dalbergia ealaensis De Wild.
- Dalbergia ecastaphyllum (L.) Taub. — Coin vine
- Dalbergia elegans A.M. Carvalho
- Dalbergia emirnensis Benth.
- Dalbergia enneaphylla Pittier
- Dalbergia entadoides Prain
- Dalbergia eremicola Polhill
- Dalbergia ernest-ulei Hoehne
- Dalbergia errans Craib
- Dalbergia erubescens Bosser & R. Rabev.
- Dalbergia falcata Prain
- Dalbergia fischeri Taub.
- Dalbergia floribunda Craib
- Dalbergia florifera De Wild.
- Dalbergia foliolosa Benth.
- Dalbergia foliosa (Benth.) A.M. Carvalho
- Dalbergia forbesii Prain
- Dalbergia fouilloyana Pellegr.
- Dalbergia frutescens (Vell.) Britton — Brazilian tulipwood, Jacarandá rosa, Pau de fuso, Pau rosa, Pinkwood, Tulipwood
- Dalbergia funera Standl.
- Dalbergia fusca Pierre
- Dalbergia gardneriana Benth.
- Dalbergia gentilii De Wild.
- Dalbergia gilbertii Cronquist
- Dalbergia glaberrima Bosser & R. Rabev.
- Dalbergia glabra (Mill.) Standl.
- Dalbergia glandulosa Benth.
- Dalbergia glaucescens (Benth.) Benth.
- Dalbergia glaucocarpa Bosser & R. Rabev.
- Dalbergia glaziovii Harms
- Dalbergia glomerata Hemsl.
- Dalbergia godefroyi Prain
- Dalbergia gossweileri Baker f.
- Dalbergia gracilis Benth.
- Dalbergia granadillo Pittier
- Dalbergia grandibracteata De Wild.
- Dalbergia grandistipula A.M. Carvalho
- Dalbergia greveana Baill.
- Dalbergia guttembergii A.M. Carvalho
- Dalbergia hainanensis Merr. & Chun
- Dalbergia hancei Benth.
- Dalbergia havilandii Prain
- Dalbergia henryana Prain
- Dalbergia heudelotii Stapf
- Dalbergia hiemalis Malme
- Dalbergia hildebrandtii Vatke
- Dalbergia hirticalyx Bosser & R. Rabev.
- Dalbergia horrida (Dennst.) Mabb.
- Dalbergia hortensis Heringer & al.
- Dalbergia hoseana Prain
- Dalbergia hostilis Benth.
- Dalbergia hullettii Prain
- Dalbergia humbertii R. Vig.
- Dalbergia hupeana Hance
- Dalbergia hygrophila (Benth.) Hoehne
- Dalbergia intermedia A.M. Carvalho
- Dalbergia intibucana Standl. & L.O. Williams
- Dalbergia inundata Benth.
- Dalbergia iquitosensis Harms
- Dalbergia jaherii Burck
- Dalbergia junghuhnii Benth.
- Dalbergia kerrii Craib
- Dalbergia kingiana Prain
- Dalbergia kisantuensis De Wild. & T. Durand
- Dalbergia kostermansii Sunarno & Ohashi
- Dalbergia kunstleri Prain
- Dalbergia kurzii Prain
- Dalbergia lacei Thoth.
- Dalbergia lactea Vatke
- Dalbergia lakhonensis Gagnep.
- Dalbergia lanceolaria L. f. – Viet. vảy ốc, bạt ong, trắc múi giáo, Burmese: သစ်ပုပ်, Malayalam: വെള്ളീട്ടി
- Dalbergia lastoursvillensis Pellegr.
- Dalbergia lateriflora Benth.
- Dalbergia latifolia Roxb. — Bombay blackwood, East Indian rosewood, Indian palisandre, Indian rosewood, Irugudujava, Java palisandre, Malabar, Sonokeling, Shisham, Sitsal, Satisal
- Dalbergia laxiflora Micheli
- Dalbergia lemurica Bosser & R. Rabev.
- Dalbergia librevillensis Pellegr.
- Dalbergia louisii Cronquist
- Dalbergia louvelii R. Vig. — violet rosewood
- Dalbergia macrosperma Baker
- Dalbergia madagascariensis Vatke
- Dalbergia malabarica Prain
- Dalbergia malangensis Sousa
- Dalbergia marcaniana Craib
- Dalbergia maritima R. Vig.
- Dalbergia martinii F. White
- Dalbergia mayumbensis Baker f.
- Dalbergia melanocardium Pittier
- Dalbergia melanoxylon Guill. & Perr. — African blackwood, African ebony, African grenadilo, Banbanus, Ebene, Granadilla, Granadille d'Afrique, Mpingo, Pau preto, Poyi, Zebrawood
- Dalbergia menoeides Prain
- Dalbergia mexicana Pittier
- Dalbergia microphylla Chiov.
- Dalbergia millettii Benth.
- Dalbergia mimosella (Blanco) Prain
- Dalbergia mimosoides Franch.
- Dalbergia miscolobium Benth.
- Dalbergia mollis Bosser & R. Rabev.
- Dalbergia monetaria L. f. — Moneybush
- Dalbergia monophylla G.A. Black
- Dalbergia monticola Bosser & R. Rabev.
- Dalbergia multijuga E. Mey.
- Dalbergia negrensis (Radlk.) Ducke
- Dalbergia neoperrieri Bosser & R. Rabev.
- Dalbergia ngounyensis Pellegr.
- Dalbergia nigra (Vell.) Benth. — Bahia rosewood, Brazilian rosewood, Cabiuna, Caviuna, Jacarandá, Jacarandá de Brasil, Palisander, Palisandre da Brésil, Pianowood, Rio rosewood, Rosewood, Obuina
- Dalbergia nigrescens Kurz
- Dalbergia nitida (Benth.) Hoehne
- Dalbergia nitidula Baker
- Dalbergia noldeae Harms
- Dalbergia normandii Bosser & R. Rabev.
- Dalbergia obcordata N.Wilding, Phillipson & Crameri
- Dalbergia obovata E. Mey. — Climbing flat bean
- Dalbergia obtusifolia (Baker) Prain
- Dalbergia occulta
- Dalbergia odorifera T.C. Chen — Fragrant rosewood
- Dalbergia oligophylla Hutch. & Dalziel
- Dalbergia oliveri Prain (synonyms: Dalbergia bariensis Pierre, Dalbergia dongnaiensis Pierre, D. duperreana Pierre & Dalbergia mammosa Pierre)
- Dalbergia orientalis Bosser & R. Rabev.
- Dalbergia ovata Benth.
- Dalbergia pachycarpa (De Wild. & T. Durand) De Wild.
- Dalbergia palo-escrito Rzed. — Palo escrito
- Dalbergia parviflora Roxb.
- Dalbergia paucifoliolata Lundell
- Dalbergia peguensis Thoth.
- Dalbergia peishaensis Chun & T. Chen
- Dalbergia peltieri Bosser & R. Rabev.
- Dalbergia pervillei Vatke
- Dalbergia pierreana Prain
- Dalbergia pinnata (Lour.) Prain
- Dalbergia pluriflora Baker f.
- Dalbergia polyadelpha Prain
- Dalbergia polyphylla Benth.
- Dalbergia prainii Thoth.
- Dalbergia pseudo-ovata Thoth.
- Dalbergia pseudo-sissoo Miq.
- Dalbergia pseudobaronii R. Vig.
- Dalbergia purpurascens Baill.
- Dalbergia reniformis Roxb.
- Dalbergia reticulata Merr.
- Dalbergia retusa Hemsl. — Caviuna, Cocobolo, Cocobolo prieto, Funeram, Granadillo, Jacarandáholz, Nambar, Nicaraguan rosewood, Palisander, Palissandro, Palo negro, Pau preto, Rosewood, Urauna
- Dalbergia revoluta Ducke
- Dalbergia richardsii Sunarno & Ohashi
- Dalbergia riedelii (Benth.) Sandwith
- Dalbergia rimosa Roxb.
- Dalbergia riparia (Mart.) Benth.
- Dalbergia rostrata Hassk.
- Dalbergia rubiginosa Roxb.
- Dalbergia rufa G. Don
- Dalbergia rugosa Hepper
- Dalbergia sacerdotum Prain
- Dalbergia sambesiaca Schinz
- Dalbergia sampaioana Kuhlm. & Hoehne
- Dalbergia sandakanensis Sunarno & Ohashi
- Dalbergia saxatilis Hook. f.
- Dalbergia scortechinii (Prain) Prain
- Dalbergia sericea G. Don
- Dalbergia setifera Hutch. & Dalziel
- Dalbergia simpsonii Rudd
- Dalbergia sissoides Wight & Arn.
- Dalbergia sissoo DC. — Agara, Agaru, Errasissu, Gette, Hihu, Indian rosewood, Irugudujava, Iruvil, Iti, Khujrap, Padimi, Safedar, Sheesham, Shinshapa, Shisham, Shishma, Shishom, Sinsupa, Sissoo, Sisu, Tali, Tenach, Tukreekung, Yette
- Dalbergia spinosa Roxb.
- Dalbergia spruceana (Benth.) Benth. — Amazon rosewood
- Dalbergia stenophylla Prain
- Dalbergia stercoracea Prain
- Dalbergia stevensonii Standl. — Honduras rosewood, Nagaed
- Dalbergia stipulacea Roxb.
- Dalbergia suaresensis Baill.
- Dalbergia subcymosa Ducke
- Dalbergia succirubra Gagnep. & Craib
- Dalbergia teijsmannii Sunarno & Ohashi
- Dalbergia teixeirae Sousa
- Dalbergia thomsonii Benth.
- Dalbergia thorelii Gagnep.
- Dalbergia tilarana N. Zamora
- Dalbergia tinnevelliensis Thoth.
- Dalbergia tonkinensis Prain
- Dalbergia travancorica Thoth.
- Dalbergia trichocarpa Baker
- Dalbergia tricolor Drake
- Dalbergia tsaratananensis Bosser & R. Rabev.
- Dalbergia tsiandalana R. Vig.
- Dalbergia tsoi Merr. & Chun
- Dalbergia tucurensis Donn. Sm. — Guatemalan rosewood
- Dalbergia uarandensis (Chiov.) Thulin
- Dalbergia urschii Bosser & R. Rabev.
- Dalbergia vacciniifolia Vatke
- Dalbergia velutina Benth.
- Dalbergia verrucosa Craib
- Dalbergia viguieri Bosser & R. Rabev.
- Dalbergia villosa (Benth.) Benth.
- Dalbergia volubilis Roxb.
- Dalbergia wattii C.B. Clarke
- Dalbergia xerophila Bosser & R. Rabev.
- Dalbergia yunnanensis Franch.
