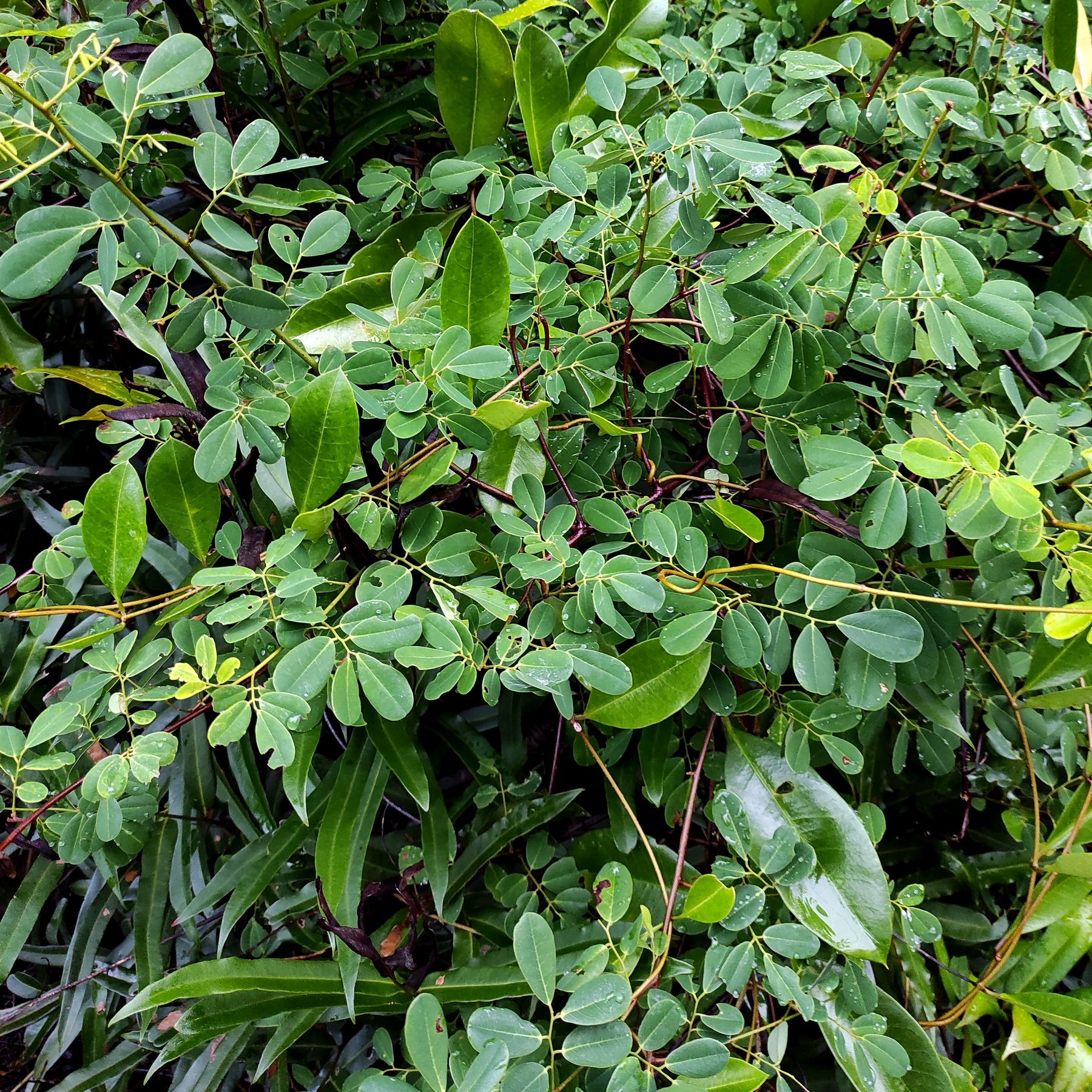

Conservation status
- Least Concern (IUCN 3.1)

Scientific classification
- Kingdom: Plantae
- Clade: Tracheophytes
- Clade: Angiosperms
- Clade: Eudicots
- Clade: Rosids
- Order: Fabales
- Family: Fabaceae
- Subfamily: Faboideae
- Genus: Dalbergia
- Species: D. candenatensis

Binomial name
- Dalbergia candenatensis (Dennst.) Prain

Synonyms
- Cassia candenatensis Dennst.; Amerimnon tortum (Graham ex A.Gray) Kuntze; Dalbergia monosperma Dalzell; Dalbergia torta Graham ex Prain; Dalbergia torta Graham ex A.Gray; Drepanocarpus monospermus (Dalzell) Kurz

= Dalbergia candenatensis =

Species of legume

Dalbergia candenatensis is a species of flowering plant in the pea family Fabaceae. It is a scrambling shrub or vine, native to regions from tropical and subtropical Asia to the western Pacific, including northern Australia.
