= Dalbergia elegans =

Conservation status
- Least Concern (IUCN 3.1)

Scientific classification
- Kingdom: Plantae
- Clade: Tracheophytes
- Clade: Angiosperms
- Clade: Eudicots
- Clade: Rosids
- Order: Fabales
- Family: Fabaceae
- Subfamily: Faboideae
- Genus: Dalbergia
- Species: D. elegans

Binomial name
- Dalbergia elegans A.M. Carvalho

Species of legume

Dalbergia elegans is a species of plant in the pea family, Fabaceae, subfamily Faboideae. It is found in Brazil.

As a member of the true rosewoods genus, its dense and hard wood is sold commercially under the trade name of mussutaiba.
