= Dalbergia andapensis =

Conservation status
- Endangered (IUCN 3.1)

Scientific classification
- Kingdom: Plantae
- Clade: Tracheophytes
- Clade: Angiosperms
- Clade: Eudicots
- Clade: Rosids
- Order: Fabales
- Family: Fabaceae
- Subfamily: Faboideae
- Genus: Dalbergia
- Species: D. andapensis

Binomial name
- Dalbergia andapensis Bosser & Rabevohitra

Species of legume

Dalbergia andapensis is a species of flowering plant in the legume family, Fabaceae. It is endemic to Madagascar.

This species is a tree growing up to 8 meters tall. It grows in humid rainforest habitat. It is limited to the northern part of Madagascar, where it is threatened by habitat destruction.
