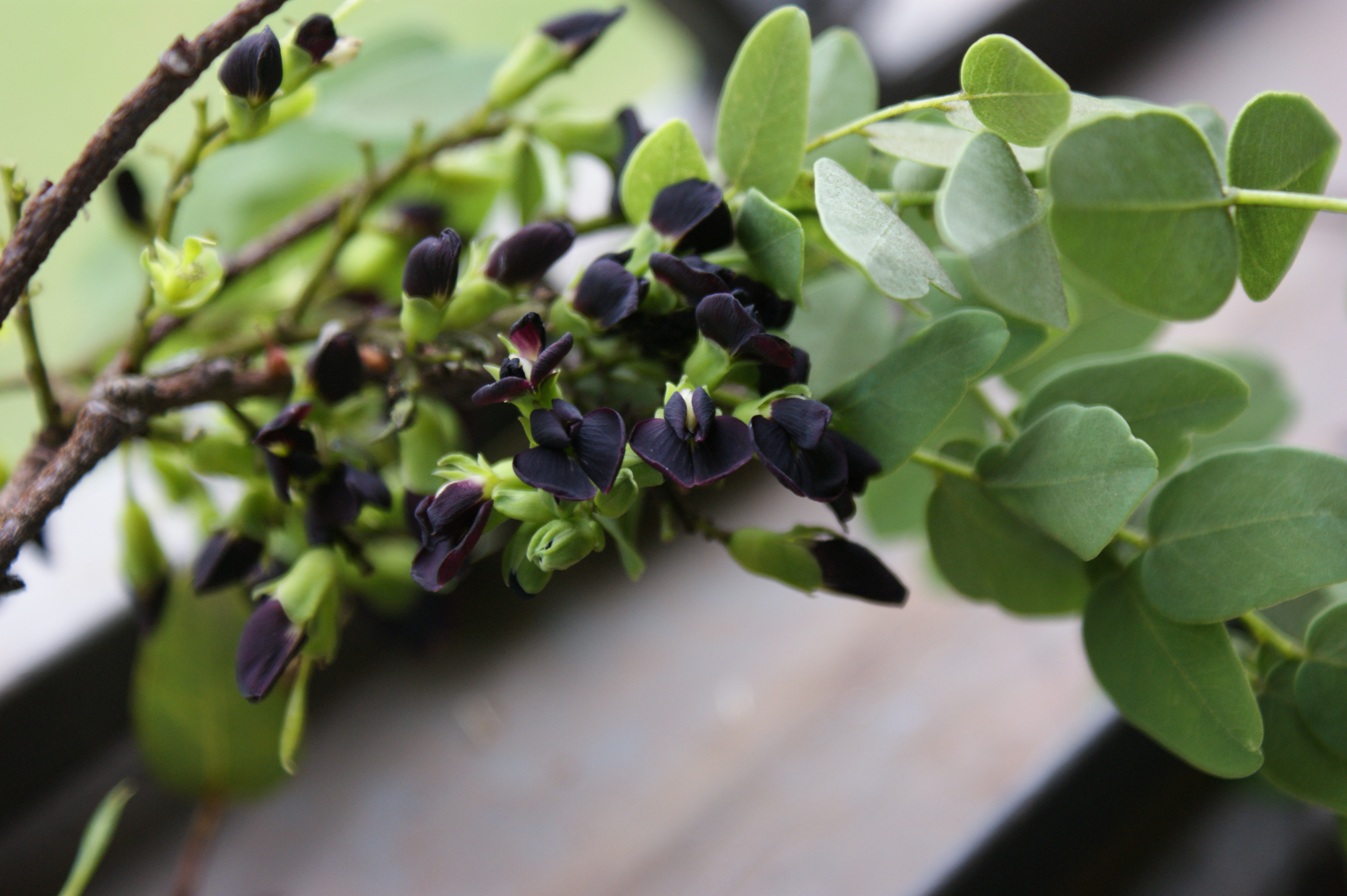
- Flowers are a very dark purple.
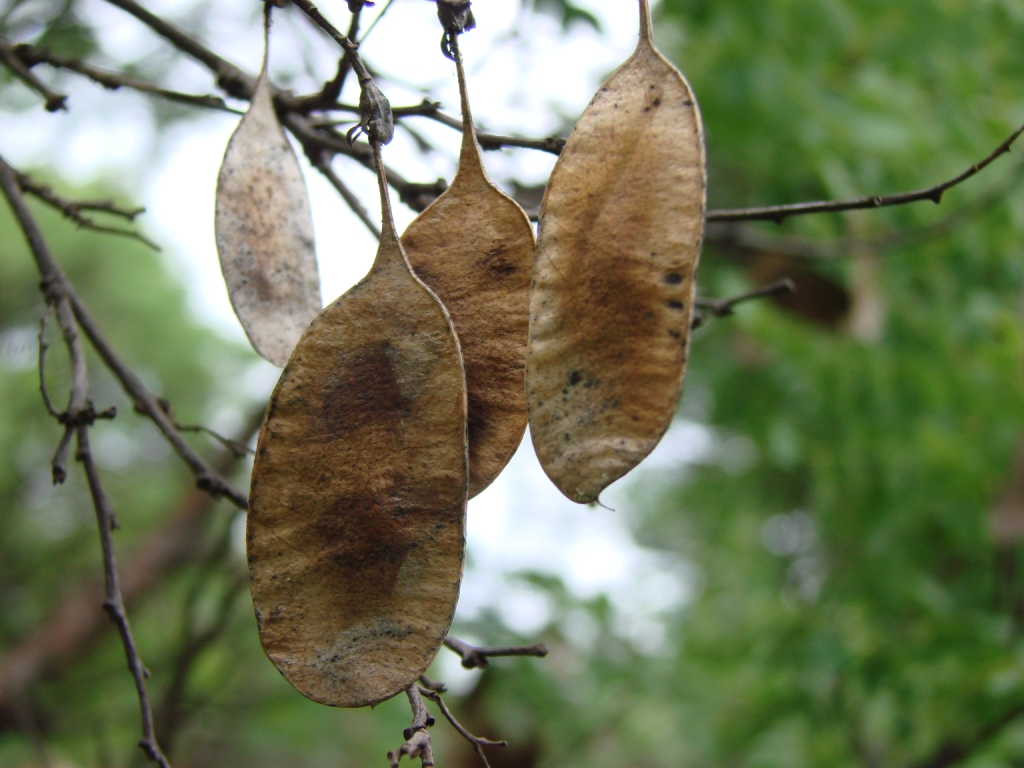
- Seed pods

Conservation status
- Least Concern (IUCN 3.1)

Scientific classification
- Kingdom: Plantae
- Clade: Tracheophytes
- Clade: Angiosperms
- Clade: Eudicots
- Clade: Rosids
- Order: Fabales
- Family: Fabaceae
- Subfamily: Faboideae
- Genus: Dalbergia
- Species: D. miscolobium

Binomial name
- Dalbergia miscolobium Benth.

Synonyms
- Amerimnon violaceum (Vogel) Kuntze; Dalbergia violacea (Vogel) Malme; Miscolobium nigrum Mart.; Miscolobium violaceum Vogel

= Dalbergia miscolobium =

Species of plant in the legume family

Dalbergia miscolobium is a species of flowering plant in the family Fabaceae, native to seasonally dry tropical areas of Bolivia and Brazil. A slow-growing evergreen tree reaching 16 m (52 ft), it is considered "very ornamental" due to its light, bluish-green leaves. It is used as a street tree in a number of Brazilian cities.
