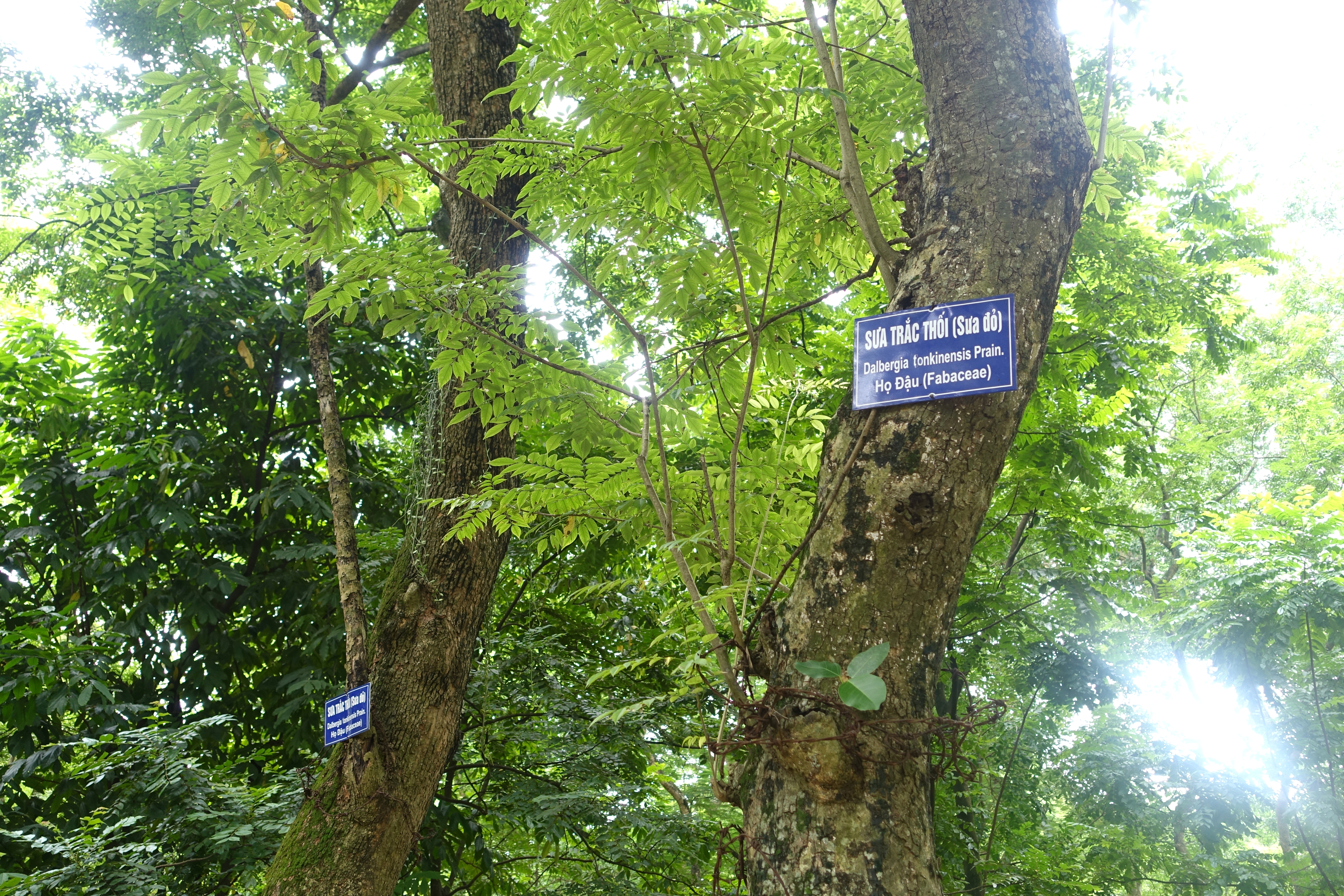

Conservation status
- Vulnerable (IUCN 2.3)

Scientific classification
- Kingdom: Plantae
- Clade: Tracheophytes
- Clade: Angiosperms
- Clade: Eudicots
- Clade: Rosids
- Order: Fabales
- Family: Fabaceae
- Subfamily: Faboideae
- Genus: Dalbergia
- Species: D. tonkinensis

Binomial name
- Dalbergia tonkinensis Prain

= Dalbergia tonkinensis =

Species of legume

Dalbergia tonkinensis (or sua) is a species of legume in the family Fabaceae. It is a small tree, 5–13 metres (16–43 ft) tall, found in Hainan Island of China and Vietnam. It is threatened by habitat loss and overexploitation for timber.

Furniture made from sua wood is particularly prized in China. While commercial sales of sua are banned in Vietnam, private sales and auctions are still permitted. Individual trees have sold for over a million US dollars.
