= Dalbergia stipulacea =

Conservation status
- Least Concern (IUCN 3.1)

Scientific classification
- Kingdom: Plantae
- Clade: Embryophytes
- Clade: Tracheophytes
- Clade: Spermatophytes
- Clade: Angiosperms
- Clade: Eudicots
- Clade: Rosids
- Order: Fabales
- Family: Fabaceae
- Subfamily: Faboideae
- Genus: Dalbergia
- Species: D. stipulacea

Binomial name
- Dalbergia stipulacea Roxb.

Synonyms
- Dalbergia stipulaceae Fern.-Vill.; Dalbergia rivularis Merr. & L.M.Perry; Dalbergia luzonensis Vogel; Dalbergia limonensis Benth.; Dalbergia ferruginea var. daronensis Elmer; Dalbergia ferruginea Roxb.

Species of legume

Dalbergia stipulacea is a species of small tree, with the Vietnamese name trắc lá bẹ. The genus Dalbergia is placed in the subfamily Faboideae and tribe Dalbergieae.

== Subspecies ==
The Catalogue of Life lists:

- D. s. kurzii
- D. s. mogkokensis
- D. s. stipulacea
