= Dalbergia lactea =

Conservation status
- Least Concern (IUCN 3.1)

Scientific classification
- Kingdom: Plantae
- Clade: Tracheophytes
- Clade: Angiosperms
- Clade: Eudicots
- Clade: Rosids
- Order: Fabales
- Family: Fabaceae
- Subfamily: Faboideae
- Genus: Dalbergia
- Species: D. lactea

Binomial name
- Dalbergia lactea Vatke.

Species of legume

Dalbergia lactea, or chencheni, is a species of legume in the family Fabaceae which is native to tropical areas of Sub-Saharan Africa.
