= Dalbergia acariiantha =

Conservation status
- Endangered (IUCN 3.1)

Scientific classification
- Kingdom: Plantae
- Clade: Tracheophytes
- Clade: Angiosperms
- Clade: Eudicots
- Clade: Rosids
- Order: Fabales
- Family: Fabaceae
- Subfamily: Faboideae
- Genus: Dalbergia
- Species: D. acariiantha

Binomial name
- Dalbergia acariiantha Harms

Species of legume

Dalbergia acariiantha is a species of legume in the family Fabaceae. It is found only in Tanzania.

== Sources ==
- IUCN SSC East African Plants Red List Authority (2019). "Dalbergia acarantha". IUCN Red List of Threatened Species. 2019 e.T32919A2828115. doi:10.2305/IUCN.UK.2019-3.RLTS.T32919A2828115.en.
