= Dalbergia bathiei =

Conservation status
- Endangered (IUCN 2.3)

Scientific classification
- Kingdom: Plantae
- Clade: Tracheophytes
- Clade: Angiosperms
- Clade: Eudicots
- Clade: Rosids
- Order: Fabales
- Family: Fabaceae
- Subfamily: Faboideae
- Genus: Dalbergia
- Species: D. bathiei

Binomial name
- Dalbergia bathiei R.Vig.

Species of legume

Dalbergia bathiei is a species of legume in the family Fabaceae. It is found only in Madagascar. It is threatened by habitat loss.
