= Dalbergia funera =

Conservation status
- Data Deficient (IUCN 2.3)

Scientific classification
- Kingdom: Plantae
- Clade: Tracheophytes
- Clade: Angiosperms
- Clade: Eudicots
- Clade: Rosids
- Order: Fabales
- Family: Fabaceae
- Subfamily: Faboideae
- Genus: Dalbergia
- Species: D. funera

Binomial name
- Dalbergia funera Standley

Species of plant

Dalbergia funera (the ebano or funera) is a species of legume in the family Fabaceae. It is found in El Salvador and Guatemala. It is threatened by habitat loss.

== Sources ==
- World Conservation Monitoring Centre (1998). "Dalbergia funera". The IUCN Red List of Threatened Species. 1998. IUCN: e.T30743A9575727. doi:10.2305/IUCN.UK.1998.RLTS.T30743A9575727.en.
