= Rosewood =

Several tropical woods of the genus Dalbergia

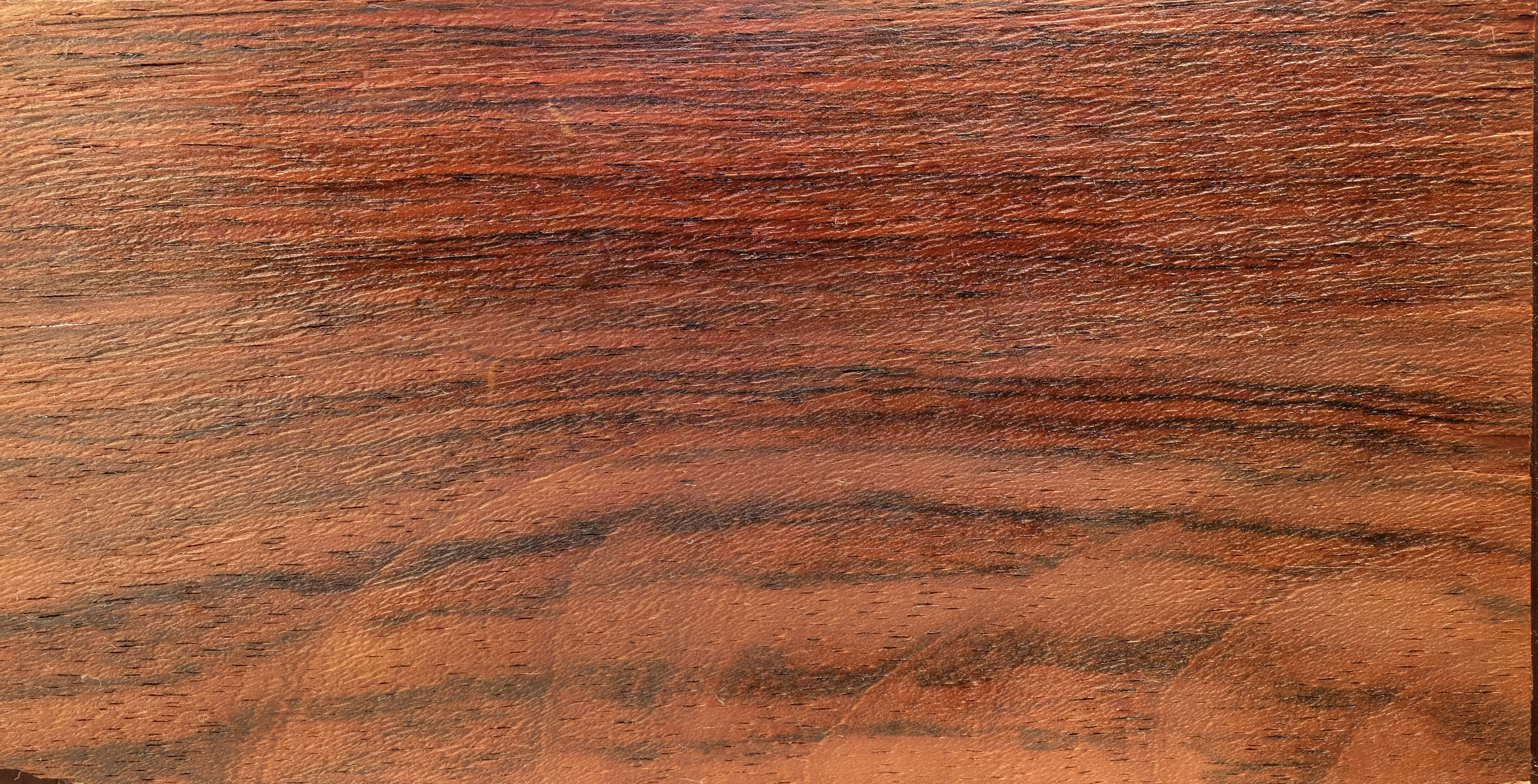
A classic rosewood surface (Dalbergia nigra)

Rosewood is any of a number of richly hued hardwoods, often brownish with darker veining, but found in other colours. It is hard, tough, strong, and dense. True rosewoods come from trees of the genus Dalbergia, but other woods are often called rosewood. Rosewood takes a high polish and is used for luxury furniture-making, flooring, musical instruments, and turnery.

== True rosewoods ==
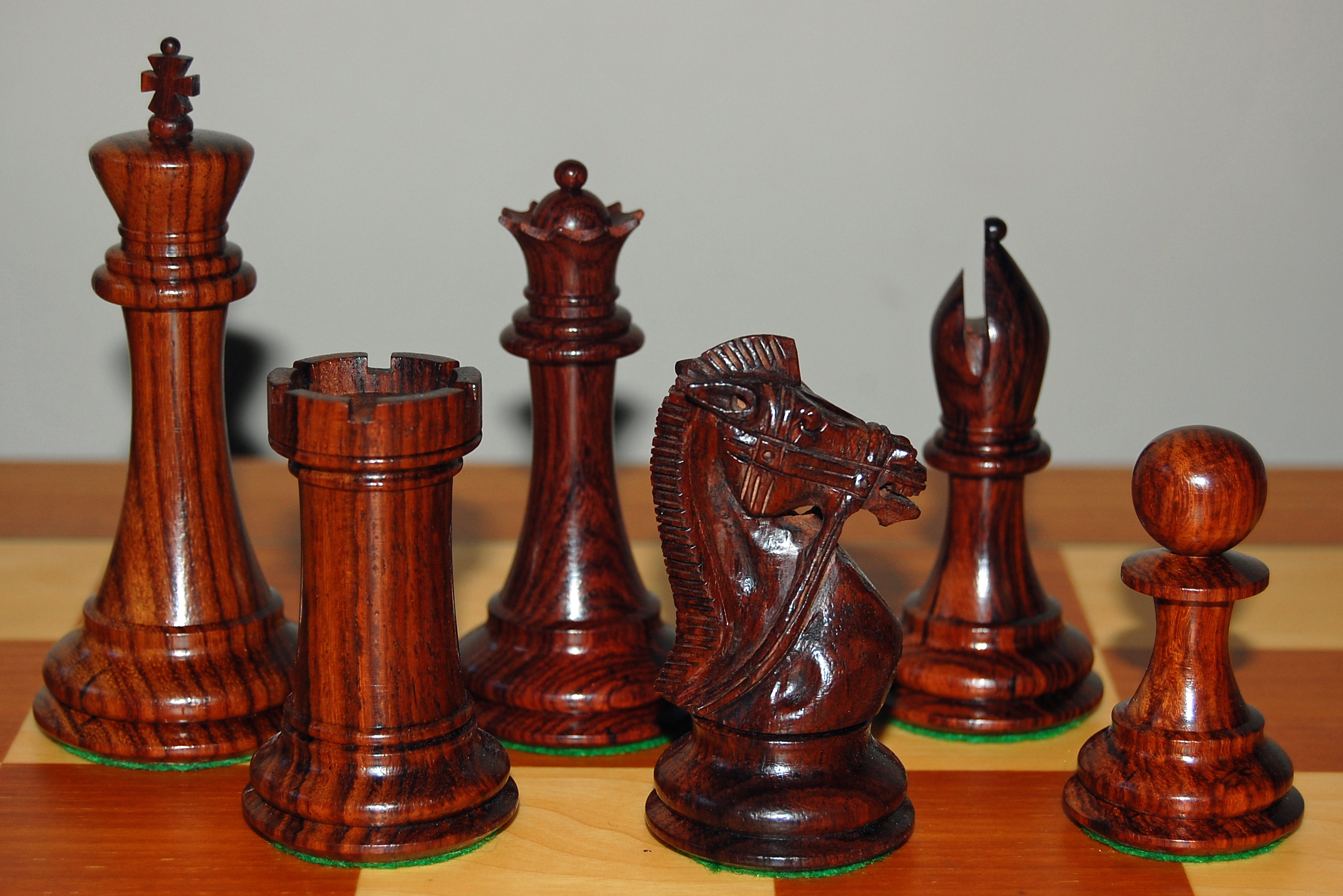
Chess pieces in Dalbergia latifolia rosewood

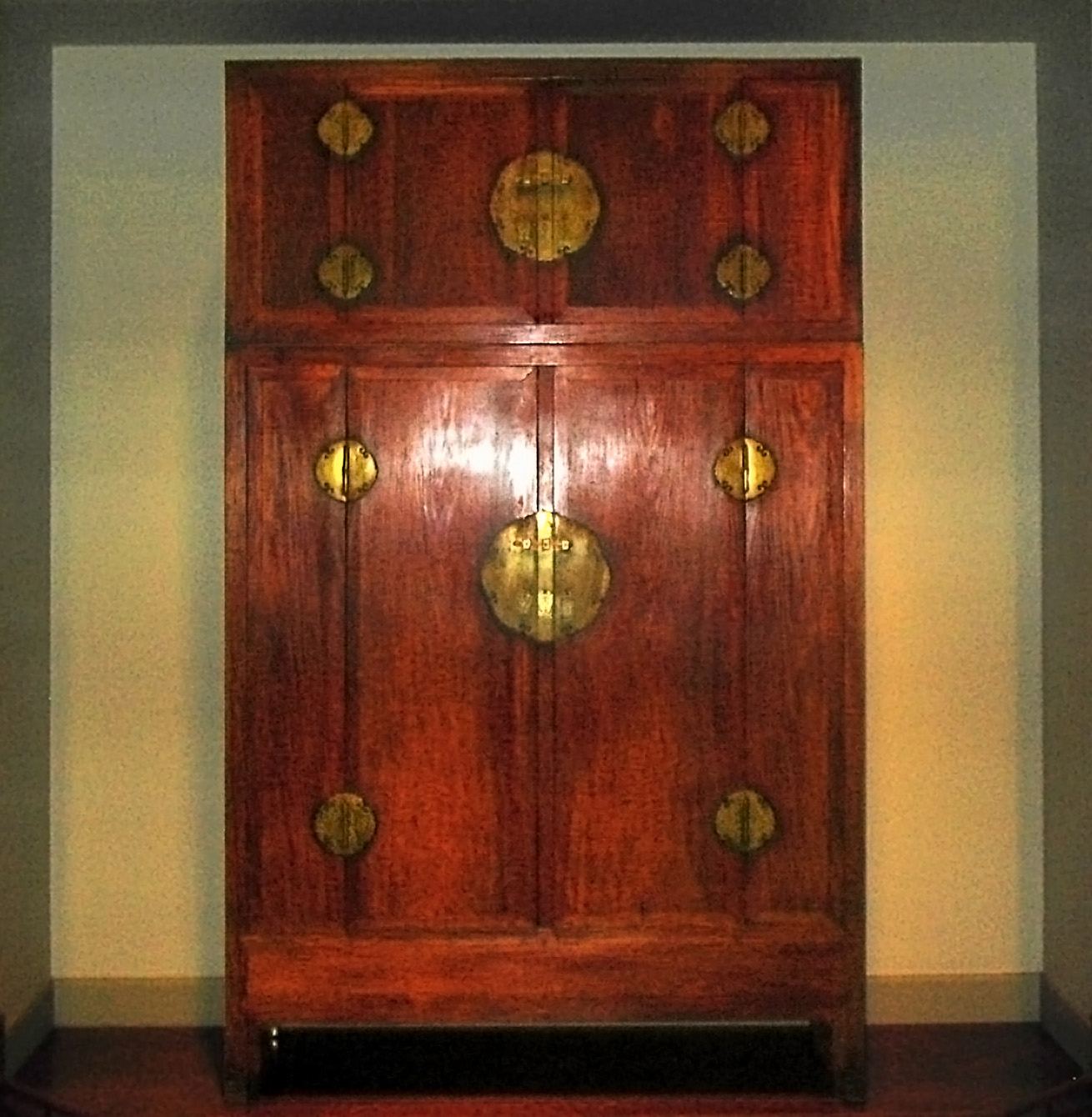
A Ming Dynasty rosewood wardrobe, 16th century.

Genuine rosewoods belong to the genus Dalbergia. The pre-eminent rosewood appreciated in the Western world is the wood of Dalbergia nigra. It is best known as "Brazilian rosewood", but also as "Bahia rosewood". This wood has a strong, sweet smell, which persists for many years, explaining the name rosewood. Another classic rosewood comes from Dalbergia latifolia, known as (East) Indian rosewood or sonokeling (Indonesia). It is native to India and is also grown in plantations elsewhere in Pakistan (Chiniot).

Madagascar rosewood (Dalbergia maritima), known as bois de rose, is highly prized for its red color. It is overexploited in the wild, despite a 2010 moratorium on trade and illegal logging, which continues on a large scale.

Throughout southeast Asia, Dalbergia oliveri is harvested for use in woodworking. It has a very fragrant and dense grain near the core, but the outer sapwood is soft and porous. Dalbergia cultrata, variegated burgundy to light brown in color, is a blackwood timber sold as Burmese rosewood. Products built with rosewood-based engineered woods are sold as 'Malaysian rosewood' or as D. oliveri.

Some rosewood comes from Dalbergia retusa, also known as 'Nicaraguan rosewood' or as cocobolo. Several species are known as Guatemalan rosewood or Panama rosewood: D. tucerencis, D. tucarensis, and D. cubiquitzensis. Honduran rosewood, D. stevensonii is used for marimba keys, guitar parts, clarinets and other musical and ornamental applications.

Not all species in the large genus Dalbergia yield rosewoods; only about a dozen species do. The woods of some other species in the genus Dalbergia are notable—even famous—woods in their own right: African blackwood, kingwood, and Brazilian tulipwood.

Some species become canopy trees (up to 30 m (98 ft) high), and large pieces can occasionally be found in the trade.

== Other ==
The timber trade sells many timbers under the name 'rosewood' (usually with an adjective) due to some (outward) similarities. A fair number of these timbers come from other legume genera; one such species that is often mentioned is Bolivian Machaerium scleroxylon sold as 'Bolivian rosewood'. Another that may be found in market from Southeast Asia is Pterocarpus indicus, sold as 'New Guinea rosewood' (and related species). Dalbergia sissoo is a rosewood species from India and Bangladesh, usually known as sheesham or North-Indian rosewood. Its timber is extremely dense and has mild rot resistance but is porous, and its exterior is soft and susceptible to wood-boring insects. It is used for making cabinets and flooring, and for carving. It is exported as quality veneers. Due to its after-work quality when sealed and dyed, it is often sold as genuine rosewood or as teak. It has no discernible qualities of a genuine rosewood. Its strength is comparable with teak, but it has lower quality and price than teak or Dalbergia latifolia.

Although its wood bears no resemblance whatsoever to the true rosewoods, the Australian rose mahogany (Didymocheton fraserianus, family Meliaceae) and Australian blackwood, (Acacia melanoxylon) are also sold as rosewood. Acacia excelsa is also commonly known as ironwood or rosewood. Australian rose mahogany, due to the strong smell of roses from freshly cut bark, is more mistakenly termed a "rosewood".

== Uses ==
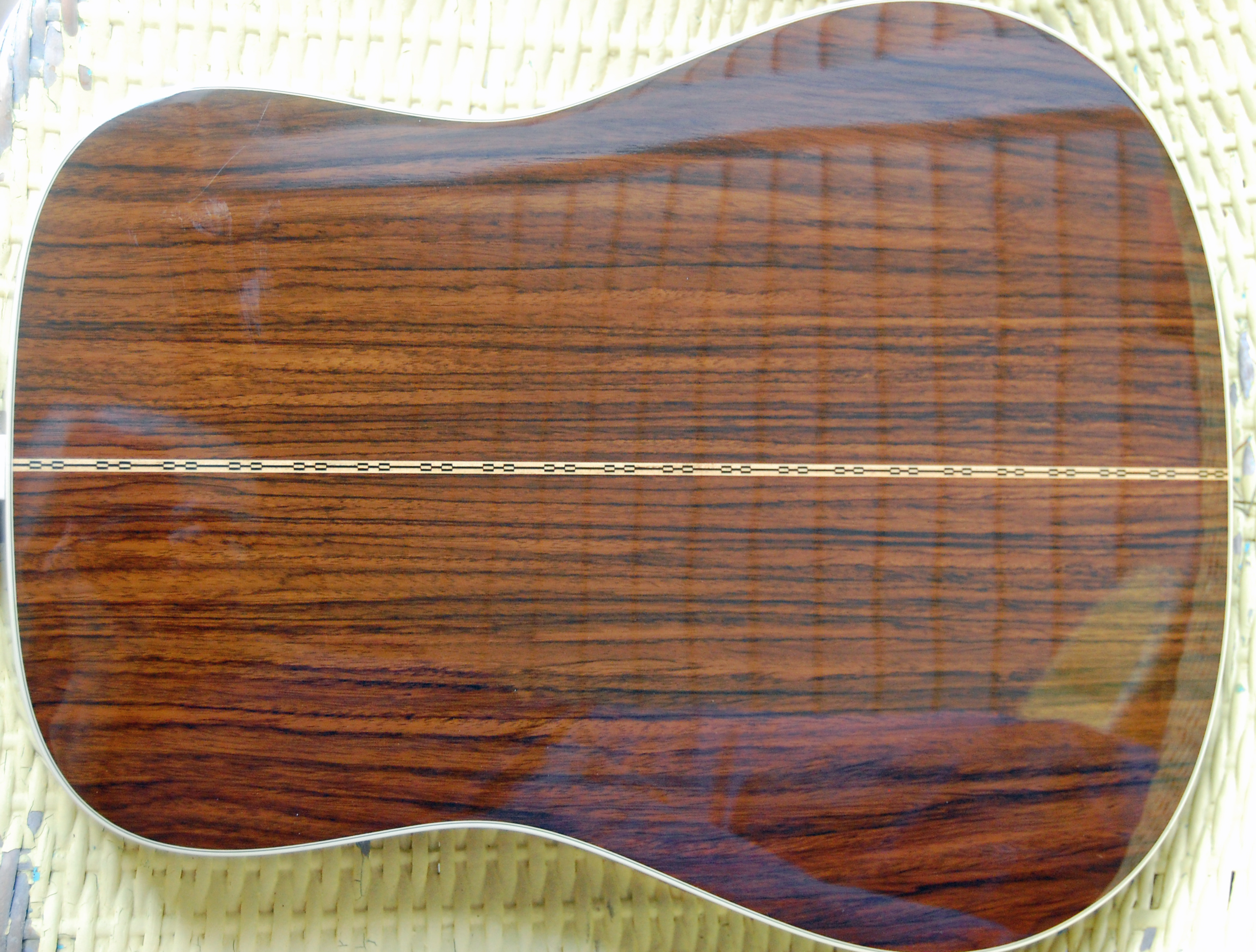
Back of guitar made with East Indian rosewood (Dalbergia latifolia)

Rosewoods are generally suitable for guitars (the fretboards on electric and acoustic guitars often being made of rosewood), marimbas, recorders, turnery (billiard cues, fountain pens, black pieces in chess sets, etc.), handles, furniture, and luxury flooring, etc.

Rosewood oil, used in perfume, is extracted from the wood of Aniba rosaeodora, which is not related to the rosewoods used for lumber. Rosewood is also used for bracelets and necklaces.

== Toxicity ==
Rosewood dust from sanding is a sensitizing irritant and can cause respiratory issues like asthma. Repeated exposure increases sensitivity, leading to chronic respiratory problems and potential allergic reactions. Proper safety measures are essential to minimize risks.

== Status as an endangered species ==
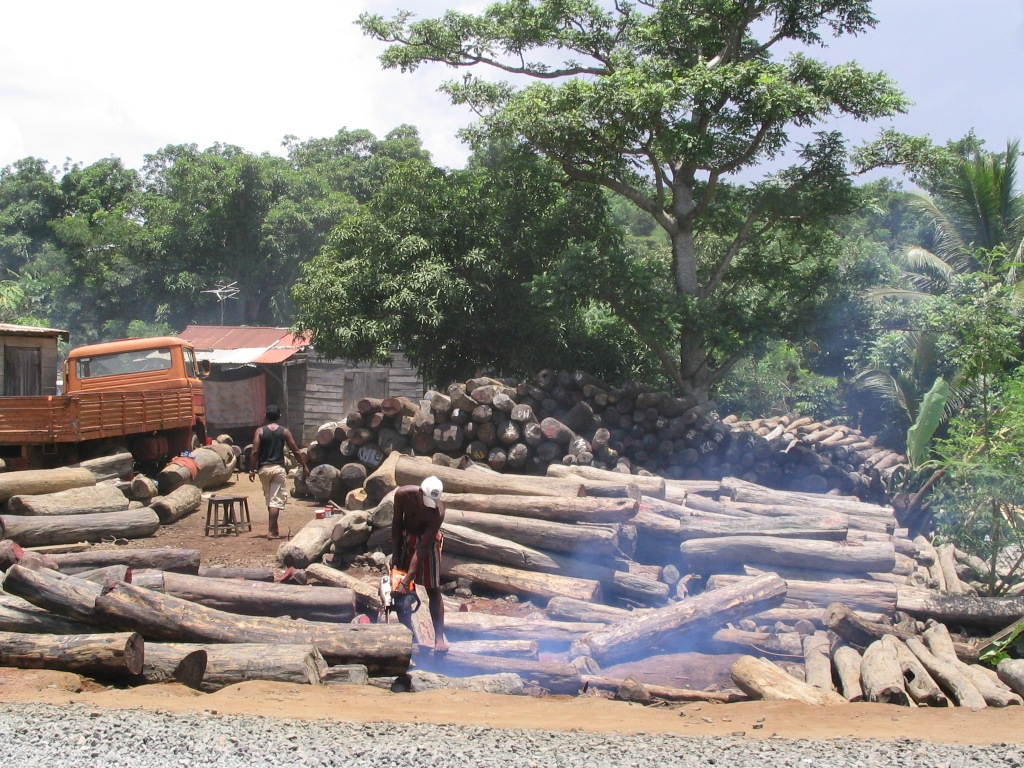
Madagascar rosewood is illegally logged from Masoala and Marojejy national parks, with the heaviest exploitation occurring after the 2009 political crisis.

In general, world stocks are poor through overexploitation. Rosewood is now protected worldwide. At a summit of the international wildlife trade in South MALI.Africa, the Convention on International Trade in Endangered Species of Wild Fauna and Flora (CITES) moved to protect the world's most trafficked wild product by placing all 300 species of the rosewood tree under trade restrictions. At CITES meetings in 2013, 2016, and 2019, additional rosewood species were listed for protection, triggering market booms in China. China's demand for rosewood has incentivized illegal logging in Africa.

== List of rosewoods ==
From Dalbergia species:

- Amazone Rosewood, Para Rosewood (Dalbergia spruceana)
- Bahia Rosewood, (Brazilian) Tulipwood, Pau Rosa, Pinkwood, Bois de rose (Dalbergia decipularis)
- Black Rosewood, Nicaraguan, Mexican or Panama and Central American Rosewood (Dalbergia retusa)
- Brazilian Rosewood, also Bahia or Rio Rosewood, Jacaranda, White Rosewood (Dalbergia nigra), german Rio-Palisander
- Brown's Indian rosewood (Dalbergia brownei)
- Burmese Rosewood (Dalbergia oliveri) Chingchan also as Asian or Laos Rosewood, (Dalbergia bariensis), (Dalbergia cultrata, Dalbergia dongnaiensis, Dalbergia fusca)
- Chinese Rosewood, Fragrant Rosewood, Huanghuali (Dalbergia odorifera) also as Bangkok Rosewood
- Closeflower Rosewood, Camotillo (Dalbergia congestiflora)
- Granadillo Rosewood (Dalbergia granadillo)
- Guatemala or Honduras Rosewood (Dalbergia cubilquitzensis)
- Honduran Rosewood (Dalbergia stevensonii)
- Laos Rosewood, Burmese Rosewood, Burmese Blackwood (Dalbergia cultrata)
- Laotian Rosewood (Dalbergia lanceolaria)
- Madagascar Rosewood (Dalbergia baronii, Dalbergia greveana) also as French Rosewood, and Bois de Rose (Dalbergia maritima, Dalbergia louvelii), (Dalbergia madagascariensis, Dalbergia monticola, Dalbergia trichocarpa etc.), for all Dalbergia-species from the population of Madagascar.
- Mexican Rosewood, Palo Escrito (Dalbergia paloescrito)
- (East) Indian Rosewood, Indonesian or Malabar, Bombay, Rosetta und Black Rosewood or Sonokeling Rosewood (Dalbergia latifolia)
- (North, East) Indian Rosewood, Sissoo, Sheesham (Dalbergia sissoo)
- Siamese, Siam Rosewood, Thailand Rosewood, Reclaimed Thai Rosewood (Dalbergia cochinchinensis)
- Yucatan Rosewood, Guatemalan Rosewood (Dalbergia tucurensis)

Other than Dalbergia species

- African Rosewood, False Rosewood (Guibourtia demeusei), (Guibourtia pellegriniana) and (Guibourtia tessmannii) (Bubinga), and (Guibourtia coleosperma) Rhodesian Copalwood, also (Pterocarpus erinaceus, Pterocarpus angolensis) also as West African Rosewood or Senegal, Gaboon Rosewood, Millettia laurentii (Wenge), Hagenia abyssinica also as East African Rosewood
- Andaman rosewood, redwood, padauk (Pterocarpus dalbergioides)
- Arizona or California Rosewood (Vauquelinia californica)
- Australian Rosewood Acacia spp.; (Acacia excelsa, Acacia acuminata, Acacia rhodoxylon also as Inland Rosewood, Acacia binervia) and others like (Acacia spania) also as Western Rosewood, (Acacia melanoxylon) also as Australian Blackwood etc.
- Bastard Rosewood, Australian Rosewood (Synoum glandulosum) also as Scentless Rosewood, (Knightia excelsa)
- Bolivian Rosewood, Santos Rosewood, Pau Ferro, Morado, Machaerium spp.; (Machaerium scleroxylon), (Machaerium acutifolium), (Machaerium villosum)
- Brazilian Rosewood (Dicypellium caryophyllaceum), (Physocalymma scaberrimum) also as Amazone Rosewood
- (Brazilian) Rosewood, Cayenne Rosewood, Pau Rosa, Bois de rose (femelle) (Aniba rosaeodora), (Aniba parviflora) and others (rosewood oil)
- Burmese Rosewood (Pterocarpus macrocarpus), (Pterocarpus indicus) also as New Guinea Rosewood or Andaman Rosewood, Narra
- Canary Rosewood (Genista canariensis), (Convolvulus scoparius)
- Caribbean Rosewood (Metopium brownei)
- Cayenne Rosewood, Bois de rose mâle (Ocotea cernua) or possible to other sources (Endlicheria canescens, Licaria cannella, Tetragastris altissima)
- False or Bastard Rosewood; others than Swartzia spp.; (Didymocheton rufus) also as Hairy Rosewood, (Jacaranda mimosifolia ), (Thespesia populnea, Thespesia populneoides) also as Pacific and Tahitian Rosewood or Polynesian Rosewood, Macawood, Granadillo (Platymiscium spp.)
- Guyana Rosewood, Bastard Rosewood (Swartzia benthamiana, Swartzia leiocalycina), (Swartzia cubensis) also as Northern Rosewood and for (Licaria guianensis) also French Rosewood
- Jamaica Rosewood (Erithalis fruticosa)
- Japanese Rosewood (Myrospermum erythroxylum)
- Mexican Rosewood, Dominican, Mayan Rosewood, Bocote; Barcino (Cordia elaeagnoides), Bojon (Cordia gerascanthus), Freijo (Cordia alliodora), Louro Preto (Cordia megalantha), Ziricote (Cordia dodecandra)
- Patagonian Rosewood (Anadenanthera colubrina)
- Tiete Rosewood (Guibourtia hymenaeifolia), (Guibourtia chodatiana)
- Rhodesian Rosewood (Guibourtia coleosperma) see African Rosewood
- West Indian Rosewood, Jamaica Rosewood, White Rosewood (Amyris balsamifera); also as Lignum rhodium
- Rosewood, Australian Rose Mahogany, Bastard Rosewood (Didymocheton fraserianus)
- Western Rosewood, Inland Rosewood (Alectryon oleifolius)
- White Rosewood (Chionanthus ligustrinus), (Anthocarapa nitidula)
- (Pau Ferro, Pau Rosa), rosewood substitute, (Machaerium firmum), (Bobgunnia fistuloides), (Bobgunnia madagascariensis), (Berchemia zeyheri)
- Only because of scent; Rosewood oil, Oleum Ligni Rhodii, (Convolvulus floridus und Convolvulus scoparius); also as Lignum rhodium, Lignum cyprinum
- Other rosewoods; Colliguaja odorifera, Erythroxylum havanense
