= Espuela de gallo =

Espuela de gallo, meaning 'cockspur', is a common name for several plants and may refer to:

- Machaerium cirrhiferum
- Machaerium nyctitans

== See also ==
- Erythrina eggersii, espuelo de gallo
- cockspur (disambiguation)
