= Pau ferro =

Pau ferro is a common name for several trees and may refer to:

- Libidibia ferrea
- Machaerium, particularly the species:
  - Machaerium acutifolium
  - Machaerium scleroxylon, with wood used in guitar building
  - Machaerium villosum
