= Rosewood oil =

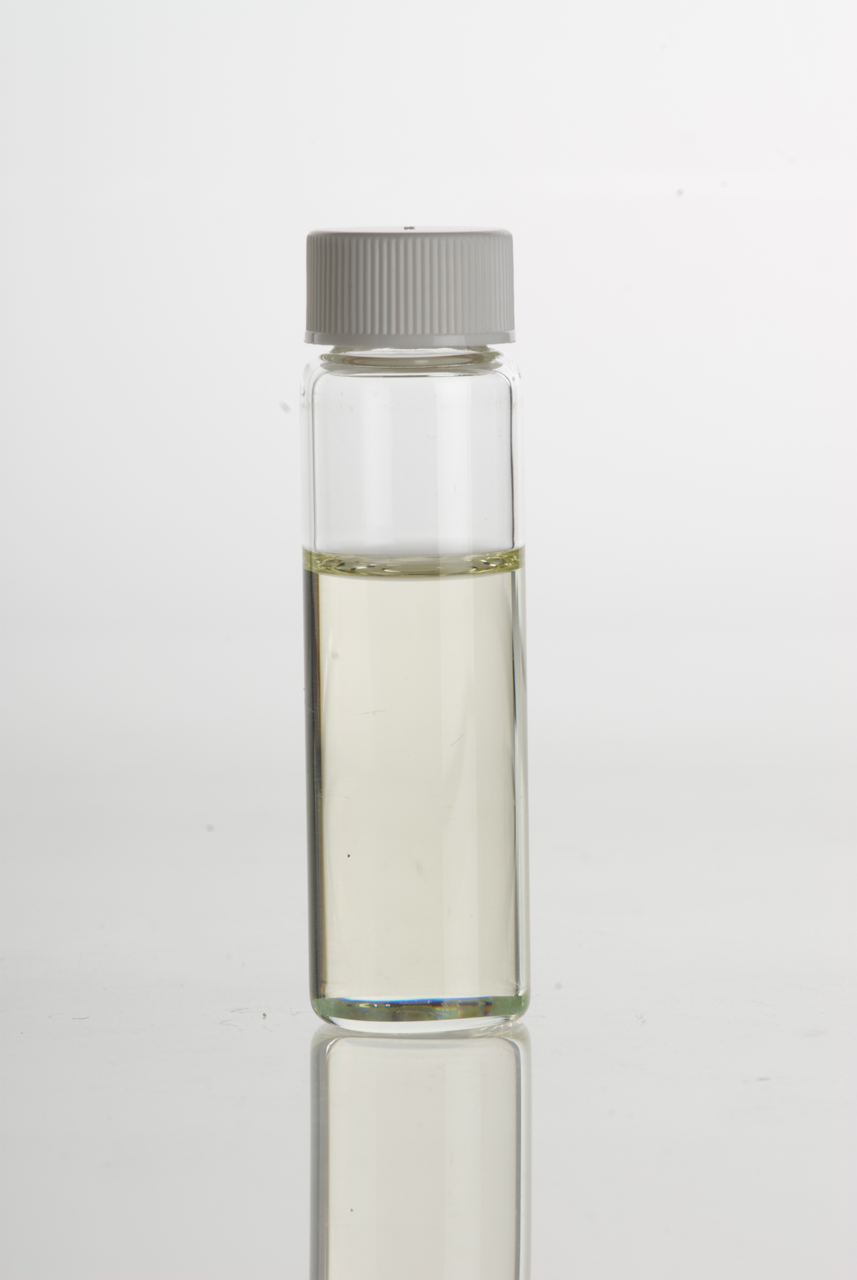
Rosewood (Aniba rosaeodora) essential oil in a clear glass vial

Structure of linalool, a substance extracted from A. rosaeodora

Rosewood oil or bois de rose, is a valuable essential oil, especially in perfumery. The characteristic floral odour is described in perfumery as "bois de rose". It contains the substance linalool, which has a number of uses. The linalool derived from rosewood oil is predominantly the dextro S-linalool enantiomer (typically >90%) though the proportion can vary depending upon the source material and ectraction technique.

The oil is extracted from the wood of Aniba rosaeodora and Aniba parviflora and possibly other Aniba species. When it arrives at the distillery, the wood is chipped, and then steam distilled. Each tree yields about 1% oil by weight of wood. After a history of massive overharvesting and species depletion, efforts are underway to cultivate A. rosaeodora, and to develop techniques for extracting the essential oil from leaves.

Because many unrelated woods are called "rosewood", some confusion has arisen about the origin of "rosewood oil". Members of the genus Dalbergia such as Brazilian rosewood (D. nigra) and Indian rosewood (D. latifolia) have never been a source of rosewood oil.
