= Na ʻĀina Kai Botanical Gardens =

Nonprofit botanical gardens in Kīlauea, Kauaʻi, Hawaiʻi

Coordinates: 22.2112°N 159.3816°W

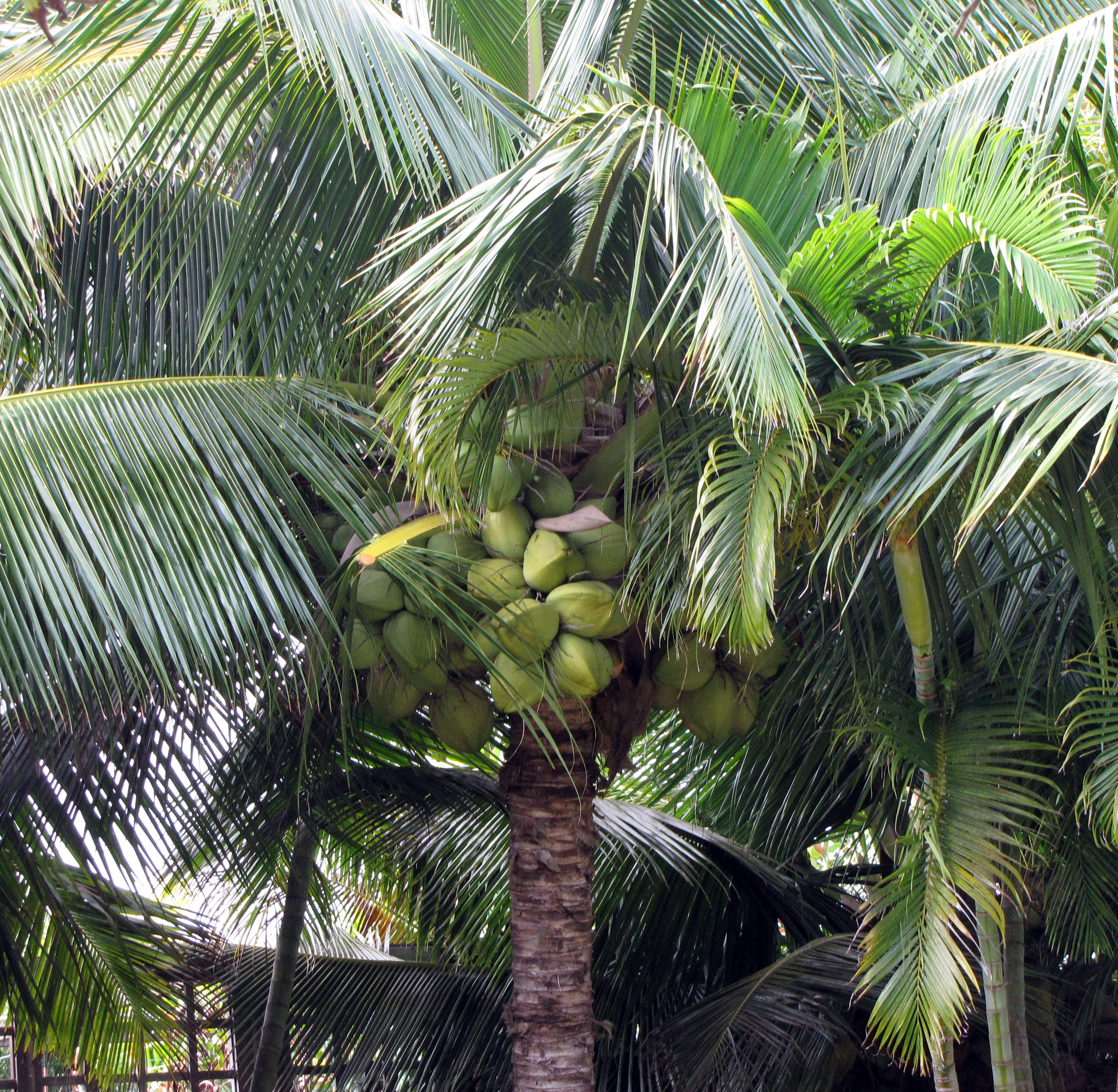
- Interactive map of Na ʻĀina Kai Botanical Gardens
- Type: Botanical Gardens
- Location: Kīlauea, Kauai, Hawaii
- Area: 240 acres (97 ha)
- Website: Official website

Na ʻĀina Kai Botanical Gardens are non-profit botanical gardens located in Kīlauea, Kauai, Hawaii spanning 240 acres (97 ha). A variety of guided tours are offered Tuesday through Friday; an admission fee is charged for each.

Na ʻĀina Kai was established by Joyce and Ed Doty in 1982. In 1999, it became a non-profit organization and opened to the public. Today it contains 13 gardens, a hardwood plantation, meadow, canyon, and beach. More than 200 bronze sculptures are sited throughout the estate. Highlights of the Gardens include:

- International Desert Garden - cacti, succulents, and other desert plants including aloe, agave, a tamarind and several baobabs.
- Poinciana Maze - a hedge of mock-orange plants, with topiary and sculptures surrounded by a lava rock wall.
- Shower Tree Park & Kaʻula Lagoon - hibiscus, ixora, firecracker flowers, and flowering trees, with lagoon, waterfall, and Japanese-style teahouse.
- "Under the Rainbow" Children's Garden - wading pool, treehouse, train, log cabins, bridges, tunnels and slides.
- Wild Forest Garden - heliconias, gingers, noni, ylang ylang, cardamom, vanilla, and ornamental bananas, as well as cacao and cinnamon trees.

Special displays have been created representing the lives of three Indigenous American peoples:

- Hawaiian Ahupua'a - depiction of a pie-slice-shaped Hawaiian land division that reaches from the mountains to the ocean. Includes a mosaic tile pictorial; 14 bronze sculptures representing people engaged in traditional activities; native plantings; and an "ocean" with fiberglass native fish.
- Navajo Compound - Backed by a concrete mountain depicting Monument Valley, Arizona, the Navajo Compound includes 36 bronze sculptures of people and animals. The 12 bronze people are engaged in typical activities and modeled after living Navajo people.
- Alaskan Athabaskan Village - Athabaskans were chosen from all of the Alaskan tribes because they have ties with the Navajos and they live in an area which lends itself to an interesting display. There are 7 bronze people engaged in common practices and 12 bird and animal sculptures.

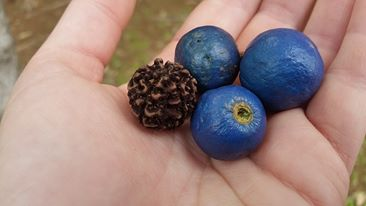
Blue marble tree seeds.

The hardwood plantation (110 acres) contains African mahogany (Khaya senegalensis), big-leaf mahogany (Swietenia macrophylla), blue mahoe (Hibiscus elatus), Caribbean pitch pine (Pinus oocarpa), cocobolo (Dalbergia retusa), Indian blackwood (Dalbergia latifolia), Indian rosewood (Dalbergia sissoo), iroko (Chlorophora excelsa), lignum vitae (Guaiacum officinale), West Indian mahogany (Swietenia mahagoni), Moreton Bay chestnut (Castanospermum australe), narra (Pterocarpus indicus), palu (Manilkara hexandra), pheasant wood (Andira inermis), Queensland maple (Flindersia brayleyana), teak (Tectona grandis), West Indian cedar (Cedrela odorata), and zebra wood (Astronium graveolens).

== See also ==
- List of botanical gardens in the United States
