= Solanum callosum =

Conservation status
- Least Concern (NCA)

Scientific classification
- Kingdom: Plantae
- Clade: Tracheophytes
- Clade: Angiosperms
- Clade: Eudicots
- Clade: Asterids
- Order: Solanales
- Family: Solanaceae
- Genus: Solanum
- Species: S. callosum

Binomial name
- Solanum callosum A.R.Bean

Species of shrub

Solanum callosum is a prostrate sprawling to erect perennial shrub which is endemic to Australia occurring from Muttaburra in Central Queensland to Condobolin in Central New South Wales.

== Distribution and habitat ==
Solanum callosum occurs on plains and small stony hills derived of sandy loam to clay loam soil. It occurs in association with Acacia aneura (Mulga), A. excelsa, Eucalpytus terminalis, and E. populnea.

== Conservation status ==
Solanum callosum is listed as "least concern" under the Queensland Nature Conservation Act 1992. It is not listed under the Australian Government Environment Protection and Biodiversity Conservation Act 1999.
