= Nambar =

Nambar may refer to:

- Dalbergia retusa, a plant species in the genus Dalbergia also known as Rosewood or Palisander

Nambar (Mongolian: Намбар) is a Mongolian personal name. Notable people bearing this name include:

as proper name
as patronymic

- Nambaryn Enkhbayar (born 1958), Mongolian Prime Minister in 2000–2004, and President of Mongolia in 2005–2009
