= Machaerium chambersii =

Conservation status
- Vulnerable (IUCN 2.3)

Scientific classification
- Kingdom: Plantae
- Clade: Tracheophytes
- Clade: Angiosperms
- Clade: Eudicots
- Clade: Rosids
- Order: Fabales
- Family: Fabaceae
- Subfamily: Faboideae
- Genus: Machaerium
- Species: M. chambersii

Binomial name
- Machaerium chambersii Dwyer

Species of plant

Machaerium chambersii is a species of flowering plant in the Fabaceae family. It is found only in Panama.
