= Machaerium nicaraguense =

Conservation status
- Least Concern (IUCN 3.1)

Scientific classification
- Kingdom: Plantae
- Clade: Tracheophytes
- Clade: Angiosperms
- Clade: Eudicots
- Clade: Rosids
- Order: Fabales
- Family: Fabaceae
- Subfamily: Faboideae
- Genus: Machaerium
- Species: M. nicaraguense

Binomial name
- Machaerium nicaraguense Rudd

Species of legume

Machaerium nicaraguense is a species of flowering plant in the family Fabaceae. It is a tree native to El Salvador, Guatemala, Honduras and Nicaragua.

The species was described by Velva Elaine Rudd in 1986.
