= Dalbergia stevensonii =

Scientific classification
- Kingdom: Plantae
- Clade: Tracheophytes
- Clade: Angiosperms
- Clade: Eudicots
- Clade: Rosids
- Order: Fabales
- Family: Fabaceae
- Subfamily: Faboideae
- Genus: Dalbergia
- Species: D. stevensonii

Binomial name
- Dalbergia stevensonii Standl., 1927.

Central American tree species with valuable wood

Dalbergia stevensonii, also called Honduras rosewood and Rosul in Guatemala, is a Central American tree species in the legume family. It grows in broadleaf evergreen swamp forests in southern Belize and adjacent Guatemala and Mexico. The wood is highly valuable, which has led to population loss from illegal logging.

== Description ==
It is a medium-sized tree, reaching 15–30 m in height and 91 cm in diameter. The bole tends to fork 6–8 m above the ground.

== Habitat ==
Dalbergia stevensonii is found in seasonally and permanently flooded tropical evergreen broad-leaved lowland swamp forests. The rarity of this habitat limits the distribution of this species. It can be found in the Toledo district of Belize. In Honduras and Guatemala, it is found in broad-leaved forests; in Mexico, the species has been found in evergreen rainforests and oak forests.

The population is likely to be shrinking from habitat loss and timber extraction.

Information about the role of Dalbergia stevensonii in the wider forest ecosystem is very limited. Like other legumes, it fixes nitrogen, which is important for improving soil fertility.

== Wood ==
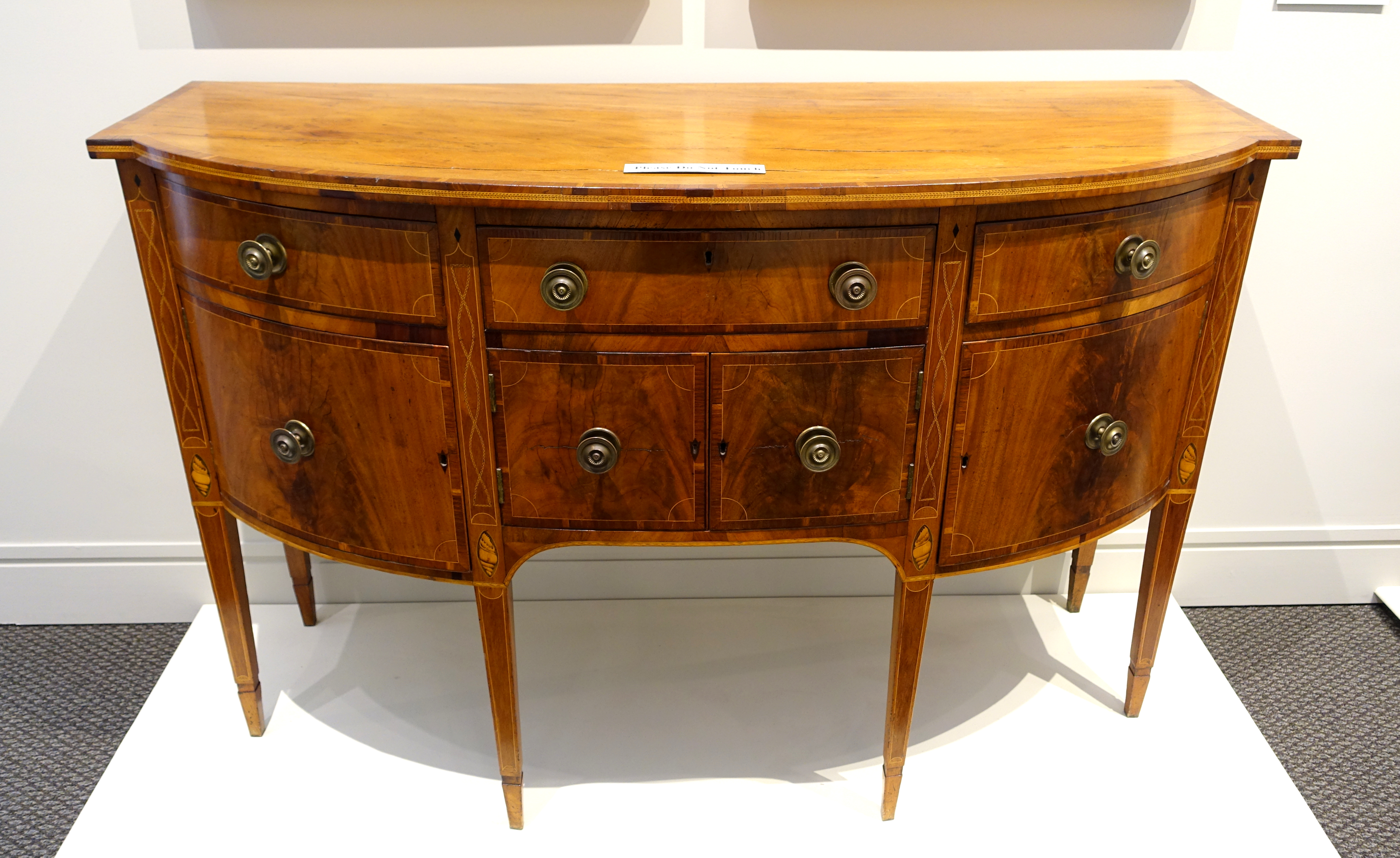
1798 sideboard with veneers including rosewood veneers

Dalbergia stevensonii is known for its colorful wood. There is a clear border between sapwood and heartwood and distinct light and dark bands that form beautiful tree rings. The color of the surface is greyish and in the middle of the tree, it is pinkish or purple-brown. The wood is very heavy and durable; dry wood weighs on average 960 kg per cubic meter.

Dalbergia stevensonii is regarded as a good material for musical instruments. It is used for making the bars of marimbas and xylophones. Due to its high density and toughness, it is a better choice than Brazilian rosewood. It is widely used in guitars, furniture, banjos, and sculptures. In Asia, it is used to make furniture and veneer. In Belize, it used to make small items such as bowls and woodcarvings.

== Global market ==
Global demand for Dalbergia stevensonii is high and increasing. Since the tree is rare in the wild and does not grow very large, and only the inner heartwood is considered commercially valuable, wood production is very limited, adding to its value. It is used as a substitute for Brazilian rosewood, and the decreased trade volume of that species has also increased the demand for Dalbergia stevensonii. Dalbergia stevensonii is exported from Guatemala mainly to Japan, El Salvador, the US, Germany, Belize and the Netherlands.

As in the early 20th century, logging is a main economic activity in Belize. Belize banned the export of Dalbergia stevensonii in 1992 except for finished or half-finished products. In 1996, legislation was changed to allow the export of logs. The increased accessibility of its habitat and the decline in stocks of other rosewoods could lead to increasing logging of the species.

== Protection ==
Efforts to protect the species have not always been successful. Some workers trying to protect this species have even been killed in Guatemala. Illegal logging, including cross-border logging, is the most serious danger to Dalbergia stevensonii. It is difficult for governments to control the smuggling of Dalbergia stevensonii, and buyers may not know the real country of origin of the wood products. In addition, timber is often transported at night and there may be no official forest sector stamp. It may also be indirectly harmed by farm activities. One example is when farmers disregard the rule that new farms carved out from forest should leave a belt of 20 m of forest along the waterway. This is important to plants like Dalbergia stevensonii that are found near rivers.

Belize has restricted the cutting of Dalbergia stevensonii and requires a license to do so, but there is not enough funding for environmental protection. In response to the widespread damage caused by the 2001 hurricane in the Toledo region of Belize, the Yaksak Conservation Trust established a tree-planting program focusing on planting seedlings of species that have historically been harvested, including Dalbergia stevensonii. Belize already protects 36% of its land area.

== Artificial propagation ==
Dalbergia stevensonii has not been widely grown in plantations, despite its commercial suitability. For instance, tree stumps sprout freely, produce heartwood quickly, and with careful attention can produce valuable wood in a relatively short period of time. However, germination is difficult. A germination test in southern Belize in 2012 found tiny white caterpillars in most of the seeds. Very few seeds germinate and seedlings cannot survive for more than a few months. This may partially explain why there are no known plantations in Belize. In Guatemala, there are no data on acreage and plantation harvest.
