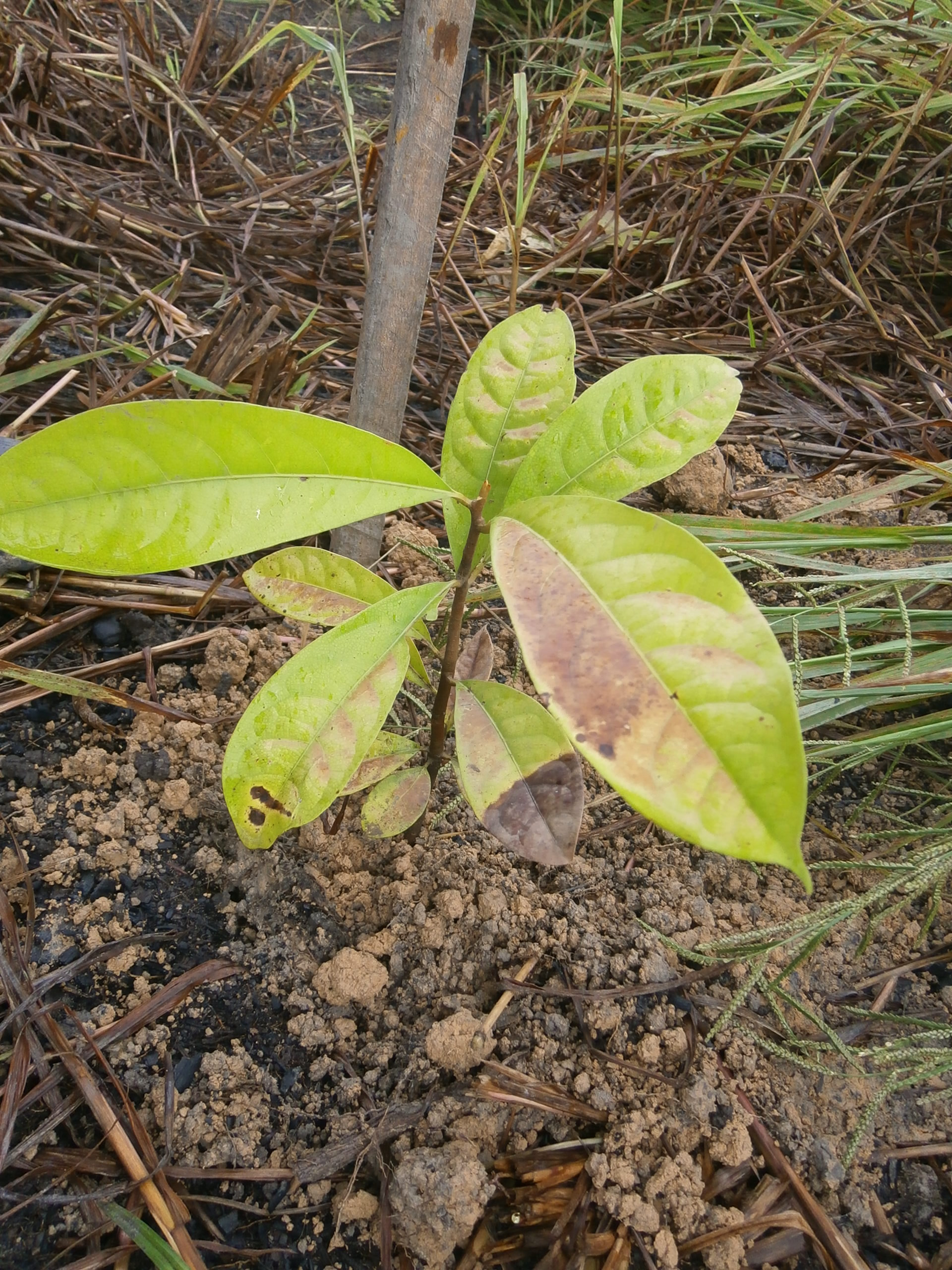

Conservation status
- Endangered (IUCN 3.1)

Scientific classification
- Kingdom: Plantae
- Clade: Tracheophytes
- Clade: Angiosperms
- Clade: Magnoliids
- Order: Laurales
- Family: Lauraceae
- Genus: Aniba
- Species: A. rosodora

Binomial name
- Aniba rosodora Ducke

Synonyms
- Aniba duckei Kosterm.; Aniba rosaeodora Ducke, orth. var.

= Aniba rosaeodora =

Pau-rosa

Species of tree

Aniba rosodora (originally published as Aniba rosaeodora; the epithet was later corrected to rosodora under the International Code of Nomenclature for algae, fungi, and plants), also known as pau-rosa, is a species of Magnoliid tree in the family Lauraceae that grows in parts of the tropical rainforest of South America. It is often mistaken for rosewood, but does not belong in the proper rosewood genus, Dalbergia, or even its order. Like rosewood, it is exploited for its essential oil, and has therefore become endangered.

== Description ==
Aniba rosodora grows in the tropical rainforests of South America. It is found in the Brazilian states of Amapá, Amazonas, and Pará. It is also found in Colombia, Ecuador, Guyana, Peru, Suriname, Venezuela, and French Guiana, where it was formerly more widespread. It is massive, up to 30 meters in height and 2 meters in diameter, and evergreen. The entire tree is fragrant. Substances in the tree include linalool and rubranine. The flowers are perfect, with temporal dioecy. The fruit is a purple drupe dispersed by toucans.

It has 24 chromosomes. Gene flow is high between wild populations.

== Uses ==
Structure of linalool, a substance extracted from A. rosodora

The plant is one of the commercially important sources of rosewood oil. The tree is collected in the wild. After felling, the trees are cut into one–meter long logs which are taken to the riverbank and stockpiled there. When river levels are high enough, the logs are floated downriver to a distillery. Because of the remoteness and difficulty of travel in the Amazon, distilleries are often mobile, movable by raft. When they arrive at the distillery, the logs are chipped and then steam distilled. Each tree yields about 1% oil by weight of wood. Most worldwide production comes from Brazil; since the 1960s, other areas produce only a minor, insignificant amount. Trees are taken from near the Amazon and its tributaries.

The wood may also be utilized by the indigenous peoples of the Amazon basin for the purposes of making canoes, but this is a minor use. In addition, old chips are used as fuel to run the distilleries. Aniba rosodora is known as Pau-Rosa in Brazil. The supply of this wood was greatly overused in the past and it now is as difficult to legally trade as elephant ivory.

== Conservation ==
Aniba rosodora is an endangered species. Populations have declined rapidly due to the destructive harvesting methods. Areas previously logged have not seen much regrowth. It might even be critically endangered. Wild populations exist in remote locations, which are hence unlikely to be exploited.

The Brazilian government has enacted regulations to help conserve the species. There have been difficulties with enforcement. Early experiments in artificial cultivation and propagation were failures. More recent attempts have been more successful. It, or rather its wood and essential oil, is on Appendix II of CITES. If the leaves could be used as a source, it would help conserve the species. It has been suggested that production methods be altered to ensure a sustainable supply. It is also listed on the Official list of endangered flora of Brazil.

== See also ==
- Dalbergia
- Rosewood
- List of essential oils
