= Cocobolo =

Type of wood

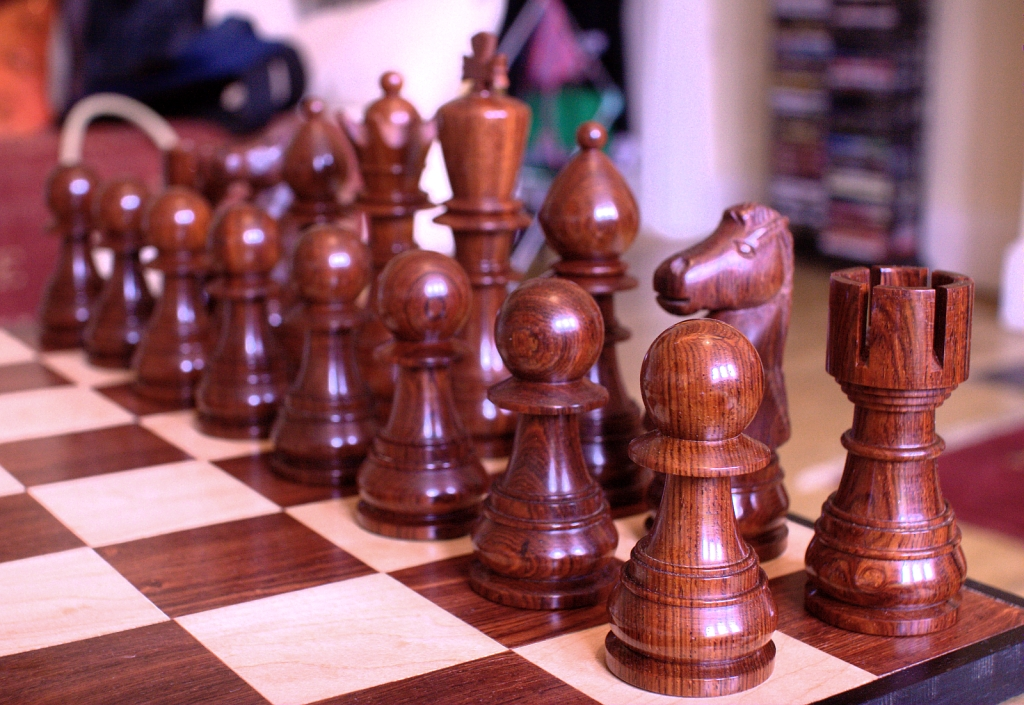
Chess pieces made of cocobolo

Cocobolo is a tropical hardwood of Central American trees belonging to the genus Dalbergia. Only the heartwood of cocobolo is used; it is usually dark orange or reddish-brown, often with darker irregular traces weaving through the wood. The heartwood changes color after being cut and can be polished to a lustrous, glassy finish. Being quite dense and sometimes having a relative density of over 1.0, it will sink in water. The sapwood (not often used) is a creamy yellow with a sharp boundary between it and the heartwood.

== Provenance ==
Cocobolo is yielded by two to four closely related species of the genus Dalbergia, of which the best known is Dalbergia retusa, a fair-sized tree, reported to reach 23–24 metres (75–80 feet) in height and one metre (3 ft) in diameter; it probably is the species contributing most of the wood in the trade. Because of the high value of the timber, the trees yielding it have been heavily exploited, so they have become rare outside of national parks, reserves, and plantations. Only small amounts of this prized wood reach the world market, and it is expensive.

== Oil content ==
Cocobolo heartwood contains oil, which lends a strong, unmistakable floral odor even to well seasoned wood and occasionally stains the hands with prolonged exposure. The high natural oil content of the wood makes it difficult to achieve a strong glue joint, as in applying veneers or guitar fingerboards, and can inhibit the curing of some varnishes, particularly oil-based finishes. Acetone may be used to remove surface oils before gluing. The oil can induce allergic reactions if inhaled or exposed to unprotected skin and eyes. This is due to the presence of allergenic chemicals such as S-4'-hydroxy-4-methoxy dalbergione, R-4-methoxy dalbergione, and other quinones and phenols. A dust collection system, coupled with the use of personal protective equipment such as respirators, is highly recommended when machining this wood.

== Uses ==
Because it stands up well to repeated handling and exposure to water, a common use is for gun grips and knife handles, and duck calls. It is very hard, fine textured, and dense, yet easily machined. The abundance of natural oils, however, causes the wood to clog abrasives and fine-toothed saw blades, like other hard, dense tropical woods. Besides its use on guns and knives, cocobolo is favored for fine inlay work on custom, high-end cue sticks, police batons, pens, brush backs, bowls, pipes, jewelry boxes, desktops and other expensive specialty items.

== Musical instruments ==
Due to its density and hardness, even a large block of the cut wood will produce a clear musical tone if struck. Renowned for its "warm, rich palette", cocobolo is used to make musical instruments, such as oboes, flutes and clarinets—especially boutique, custom barrel joints for B-flat clarinets. Other woodwind instruments, such as bagpipes (as well as the chanters of bagpipes' more basic relatives, duck and goose calls), have been successfully made using cocobolo instead of the orchestral and Celtic instruments' customary mpingo, or African blackwood, known in the trade as grenadilla. Additionally, cocobolo has been used to make fingerboards, as well as entire necks and bodies of guitars and bass guitars, having been employed as a substitute for Brazilian Rosewood since that fellow Dalbergia member was CITES listed in 1992. Additionally, cocobolo is used to an extent in building drums.

== Conservation ==
Logs, sawn wood, and veneer sheets from the Guatemalan populations of Cocobolo (Dalbergia retusa), have been listed under CITES Appendix III since 2008. In 2011, Panama extended that listing to include all products except seeds and pollen and finished products packaged and ready for retail trade.

As of January 2, 2017, Cocobolo is protected as a CITES Appendix II species, along with Bubinga (Guibourtia demeusei, G. pellegriniana, and G. tessmanni), other true rosewoods (Dalbergia spp.) and related species found in the Dalbergia genus, such as Tulipwood, Kingwood, and African Blackwood.
