= Cockspur =

Cockspur or variants may refer to:

- Cockspur Island, in the Savannah River, Georgia, United States
- Cockspur Rum, a rum brand from Barbados
- Dactylis glomerata, or cockspur, a type of wild grass
- Echinochloa crus-galli, or cockspur, a type of wild grass
- Erythrina eggersii, or cock's spur, a vine or tree in the family Fabaceae

== See also ==
- Cockspur Street, in the City of Westminster, London, England
- Erythrina crista-galli, the cockspur coral tree
- Centaurea solstitialis, or yellow cockspur
- Coleus australis, or cockspur flower
- Cockspur thorn, the common name of several species
- Cockspur Cup, former name of the ECB National Club Cricket Championship
