= Cockspur thorn =

Cockspurn thorn is a common name for several plants and may refer to:

- Crataegus crus-galli, a species of hawthorn native to eastern North America.
  - Crataegus succulenta, round-fruited cockspur thorn
- Maclura cochinchinensis, a species of vine or scrambling shrub in the family Moraceae, native to eastern Asia and Australia.

== See also ==
- Cockspur (disambiguation)
