= Machaerium cirrhiferum =

Conservation status
- Least Concern (IUCN 2.3)

Scientific classification
- Kingdom: Plantae
- Clade: Tracheophytes
- Clade: Angiosperms
- Clade: Eudicots
- Clade: Rosids
- Order: Fabales
- Family: Fabaceae
- Subfamily: Faboideae
- Genus: Machaerium
- Species: M. cirrhiferum

Binomial name
- Machaerium cirrhiferum Pitt.

Species of legume

Machaerium cirrhiferum, the espuela de gallo or espuela de gato, is a species of flowering plant in the family Fabaceae. It is found in Colombia, Costa Rica, Mexico, and Panama.
