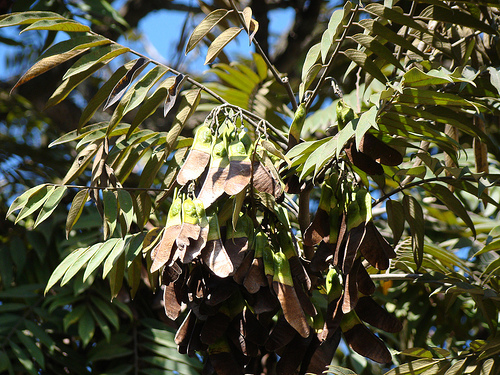

Conservation status
- Vulnerable (IUCN 2.3)

Scientific classification
- Kingdom: Plantae
- Clade: Tracheophytes
- Clade: Angiosperms
- Clade: Eudicots
- Clade: Rosids
- Order: Fabales
- Family: Fabaceae
- Subfamily: Faboideae
- Genus: Machaerium
- Species: M. villosum

Binomial name
- Machaerium villosum Vogel

= Machaerium villosum =

Species of plant

Machaerium villosum, the jacarandá-do-cerrado, jacarandá-pardo, jacarandá-paulista, or jacarandá-pedra, is a native tree belonging to the Fabaceae family, primarily in Brazil. These trees preferably grown on the Cerrado and Caatinga, but they can also inhabit the Atlantic Forest. They are currently vulnerable due to logging and, primarily, habitat loss for agriculture and livestock.

== Characteristics ==
=== Flowers and fruits ===
The jacarandás-paulista have panicle-type inflorescences, composed of white flowers with a green and white striped banner, that emits a sweet scent to attract its pollinators. This plant produces samara-type fruits, typically dispersed by the wind.

Flowering usually occurs from August to January, peaking between October and December, while fruiting is observed throughout the year, mainly between January and June. Flowers and fruits can be found in January, March, and October.

=== Wood ===
This tree can provide hardwood very similar to that of jacarandá-da-bahia (Dalbergia nigra). Its surface is irregularly shiny, with a brown trunk featuring reflections, stripes, or dark shadows. It is widely used in the manufacture of luxury furniture, decorative items, parquet, and flooring.
