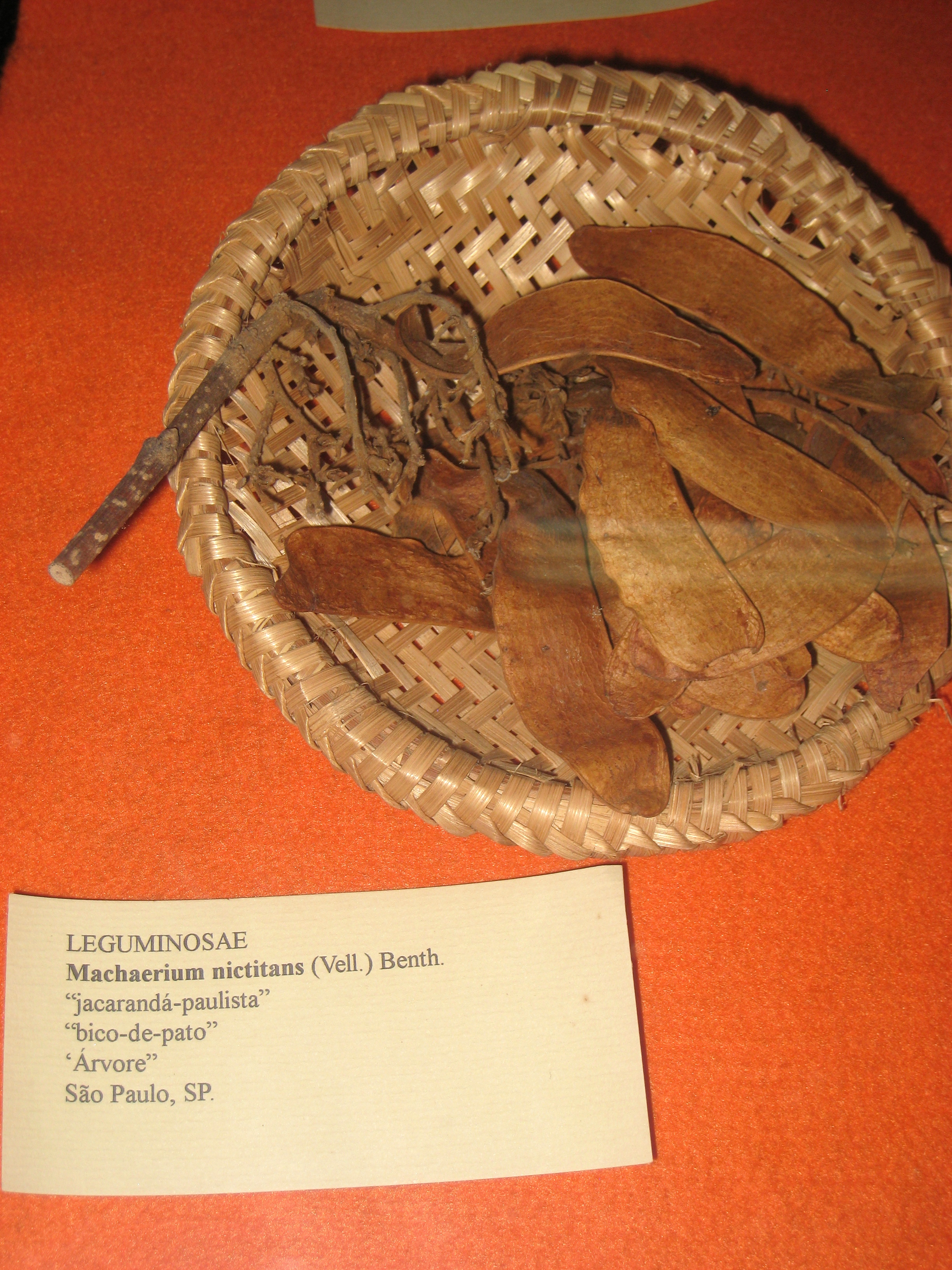

Scientific classification
- Kingdom: Plantae
- Clade: Tracheophytes
- Clade: Angiosperms
- Clade: Eudicots
- Clade: Rosids
- Order: Fabales
- Family: Fabaceae
- Subfamily: Faboideae
- Genus: Machaerium
- Species: M. nyctitans

Binomial name
- Machaerium nyctitans (Vell.) Benth.

Synonyms
- Nissolia nyctitans Vell.

= Machaerium nyctitans =

Species of legume

Machaerium nyctitans, also known as canela do brejo or espuela de gallo, is a tree species in the family Fabaceae, native to Brazil and Argentina.
