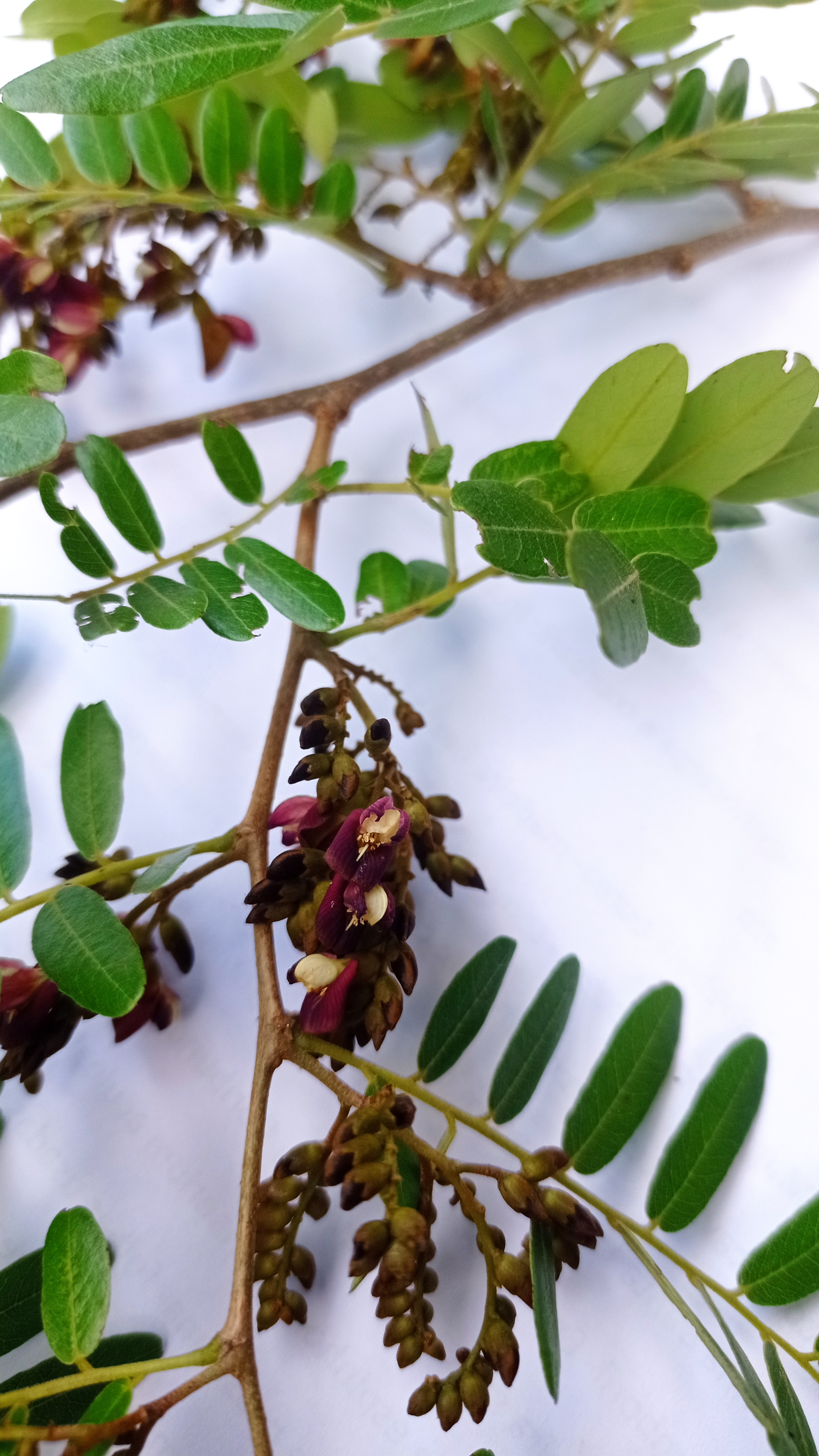
- Flowers and leaves
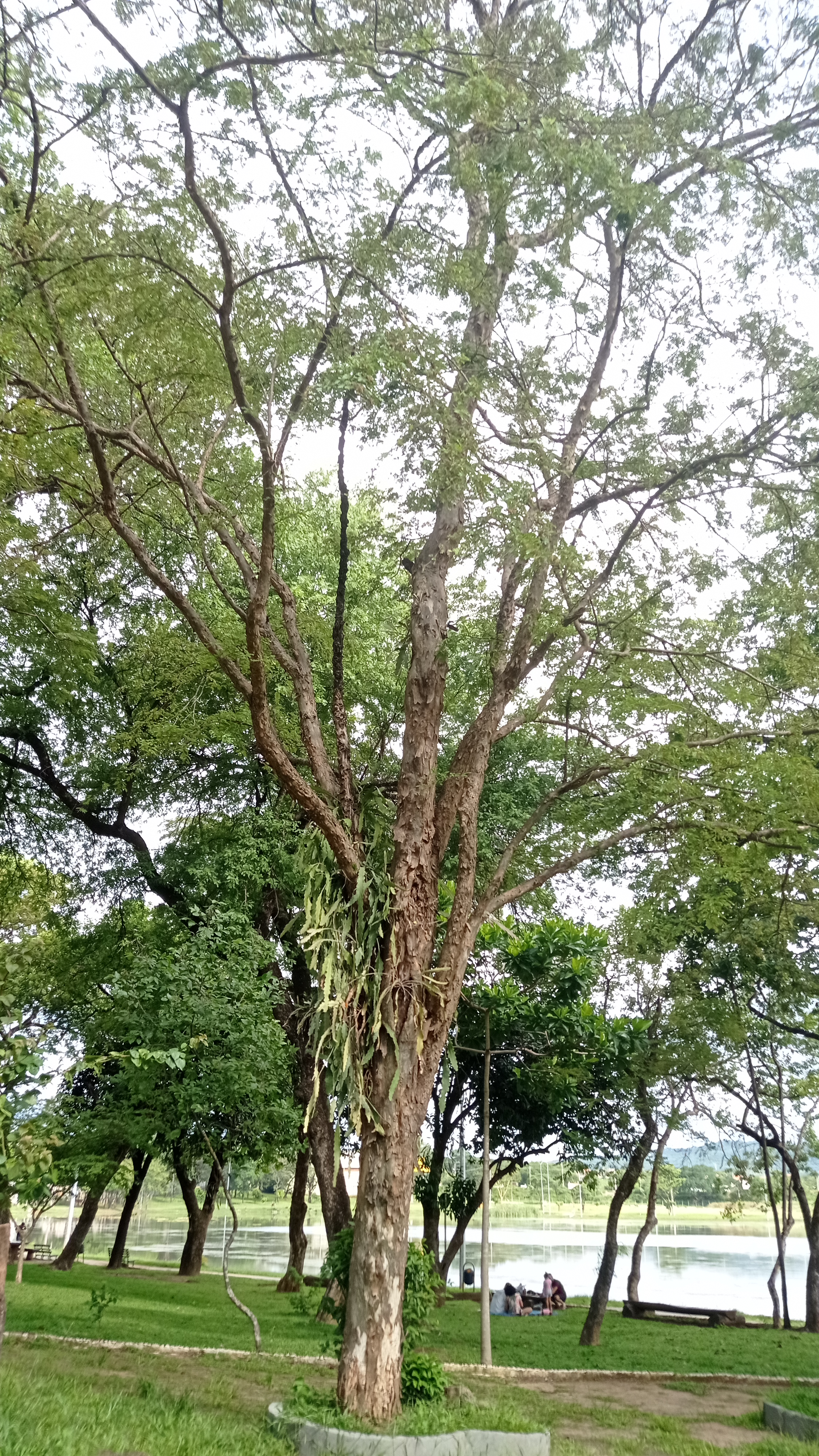
- Habit

Conservation status
- Least Concern (IUCN 3.1)

Scientific classification
- Kingdom: Plantae
- Clade: Tracheophytes
- Clade: Angiosperms
- Clade: Eudicots
- Clade: Rosids
- Order: Fabales
- Family: Fabaceae
- Subfamily: Faboideae
- Genus: Machaerium
- Species: M. scleroxylon

Binomial name
- Machaerium scleroxylon Tul.

= Machaerium scleroxylon =

Species of plant

Machaerium scleroxylon is a species of tree in the family Fabaceae Common names for the species include pau ferro, morado, caviuna, Bolivian rosewood, and Santos rosewood. The wood is used as an alternative species to genuine rosewoods belonging to the genus Dalbergia.

Machaerium scleroxylon is a deciduous tree characterized by a spiny nature and a compact, vase-shaped crown, and has the potential to reach heights of 15 to 25 m. The trunk, featuring grooves and often branching at a low level, can attain a diameter of 50 to 90 cm. The tree is sought after for its appealing timber, leading to frequent wild harvesting. It also serves as a valuable pioneer species in woodland restoration and is commonly cultivated for ornamental purposes, prized for its attractive bark and delicate leaves. The species holds particular interest for street planting due to the spines on young trunks acting as a deterrent against vandalism. It thrives in semideciduous forests, adapting to both dense primary formations and more open, secondary growth areas, while it shows a preference for clayey, fertile soils with good drainage.

== Uses ==
Its wood has a similar feel and similar tonal attributes to genuine rosewoods, but is near 1000 points softer on the Janka hardness scale on average or more than all of the commonly traded species of rosewood except for Sisso and Amazonian rosewood (Dalbergia spruceana). It also ranks lower in density of 5-10 lbs per cubic foot compared to common rosewoods (roughly 54 lbs/cf compared to 60-66 lbs/cf), though it does have a negligibly higher crushing strength and modulus of rupture than a few species of rosewood. Pau ferro is lighter colored having more tans and light browns contrasting darker areas of its figure. The wood may also be used for flooring, fancy furniture, and handgun grips.

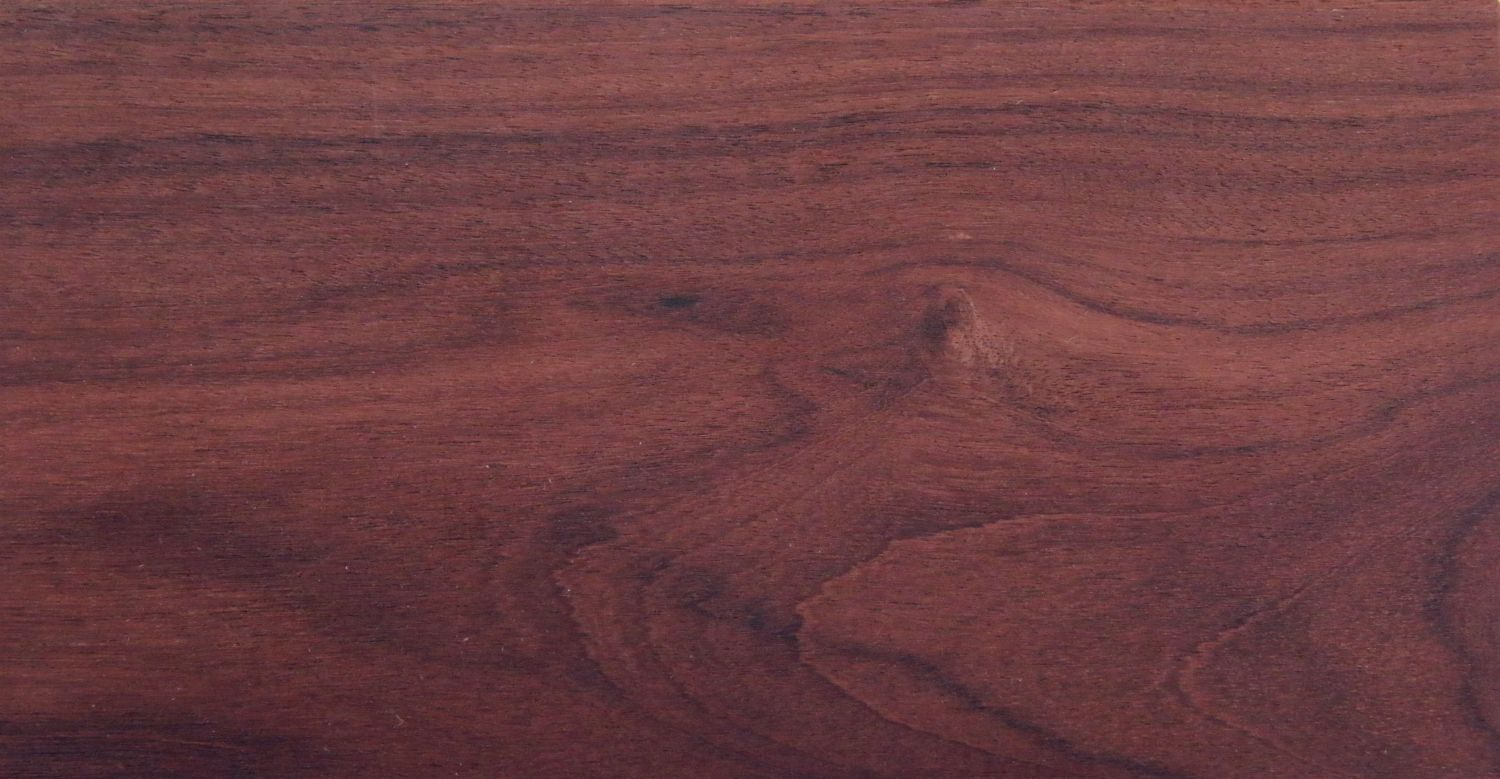
Sample of Santos rosewood

In guitar making, pau ferro is mainly used for fingerboards and bridges. Some luthiers also use it for the back and sides of acoustic guitars.

Following the expansion of CITES regulations to restrict trade on all species of rosewood in 2017, Fender began using pau ferro on models which had previously featured rosewood fretboards. Although the restrictions were lifted in 2019, pau ferro fretboards remained in place across much of the manufacturer's product range, in particular on Mexican-made instruments.

== Allergy information ==
Pau ferro, used as a rosewood substitute, is a strong sensitizer capable of causing acute outbreaks of allergic and irritant dermatitis in workers not previously exposed to it. This, however, has not prevented furniture factories from using the product. The allergen it contains is (R)-3,4-dimethoxydalbergion, a strong skin sensitizer.
