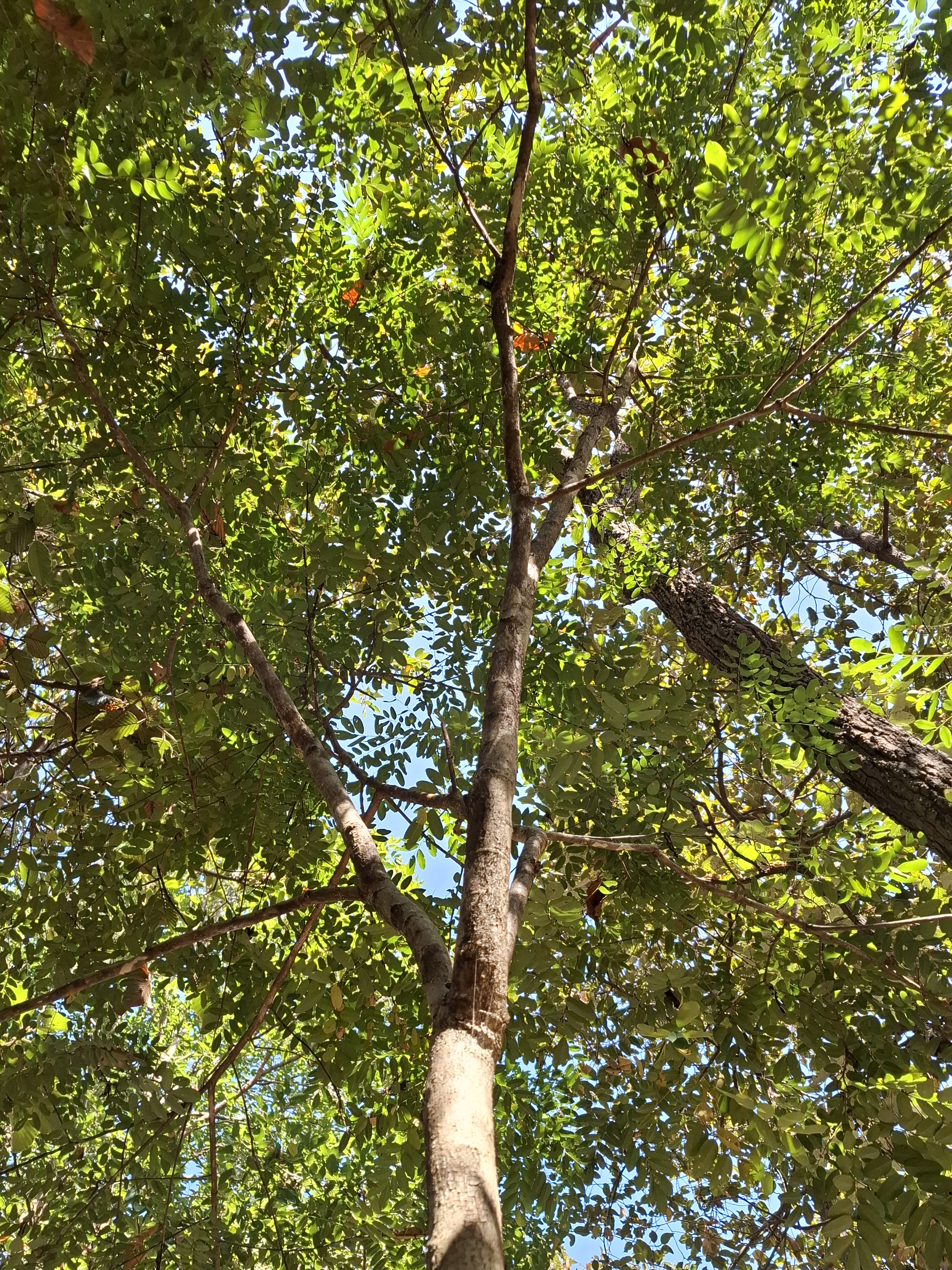
- A view of the canopy
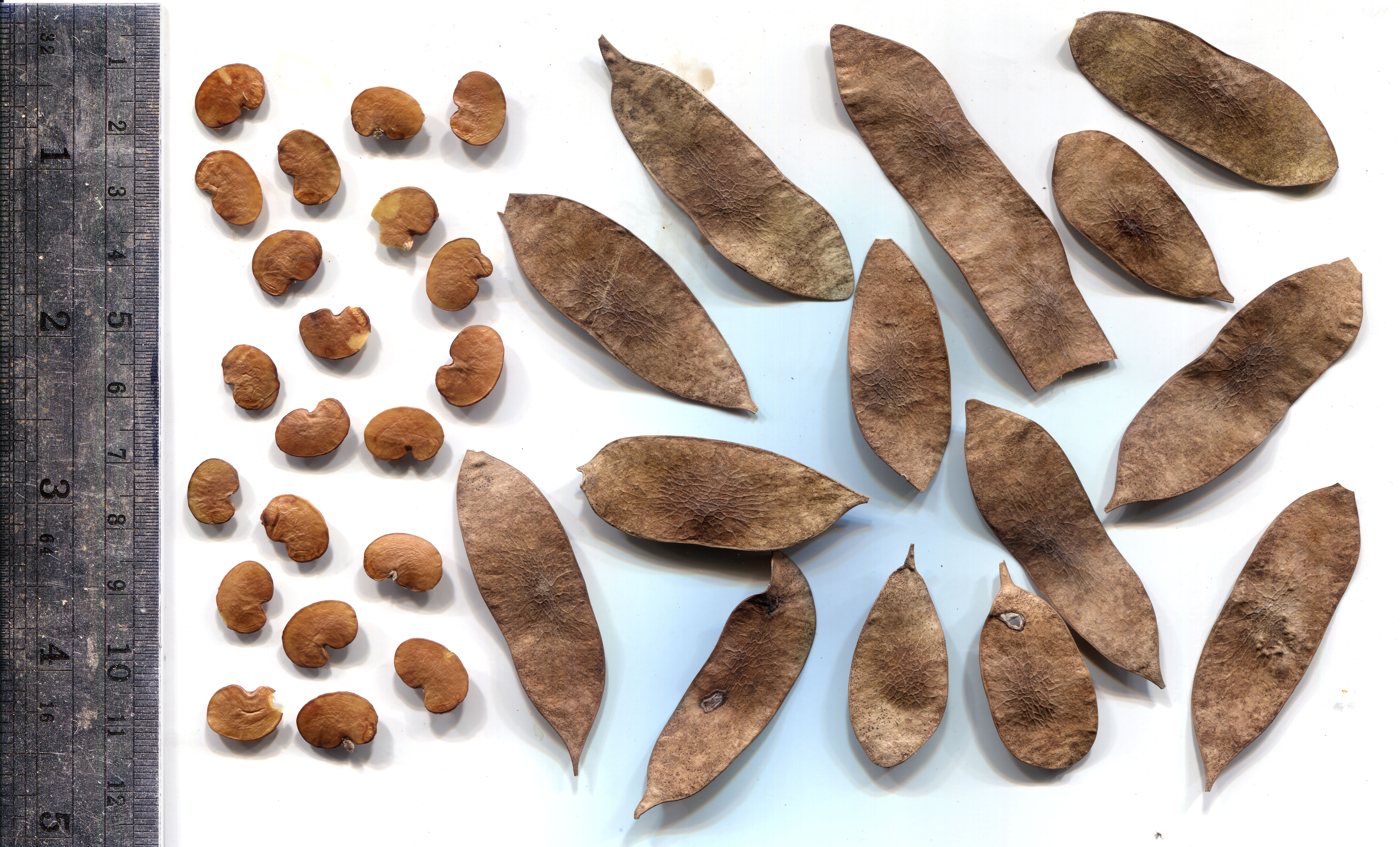
- Seeds and seedpods

Conservation status
- Near Threatened (IUCN 3.1)

Scientific classification
- Kingdom: Plantae
- Clade: Embryophytes
- Clade: Tracheophytes
- Clade: Spermatophytes
- Clade: Angiosperms
- Clade: Eudicots
- Clade: Rosids
- Order: Fabales
- Family: Fabaceae
- Subfamily: Faboideae
- Genus: Dalbergia
- Species: D. cultrata

Binomial name
- Dalbergia cultrata Ralph

Synonyms
- Amerimnon cultratum (Ralph) Kuntze; Dalbergia cultrata f. fusca (Pierre) Thoth.; Dalbergia cultrata var. maymyensis Thoth.; Dalbergia cultrata var. pallida Craib; Dalbergia cultrata var. tavoyensis Thoth.; Dalbergia fusca Pierre

= Dalbergia cultrata =

Species of plant

Dalbergia cultrata, the Burma blackwood, is a species of flowering plant in the family Fabaceae. It is native to Assam, Bangladesh, Yunnan, and mainland Southeast Asia. A tree with red wood, it is typically found in open woodlands at elevations from 120 to 1,700 m (400 to 5,600 ft). It has been assessed as Near Threatened because of overharvesting for its valuable timber.

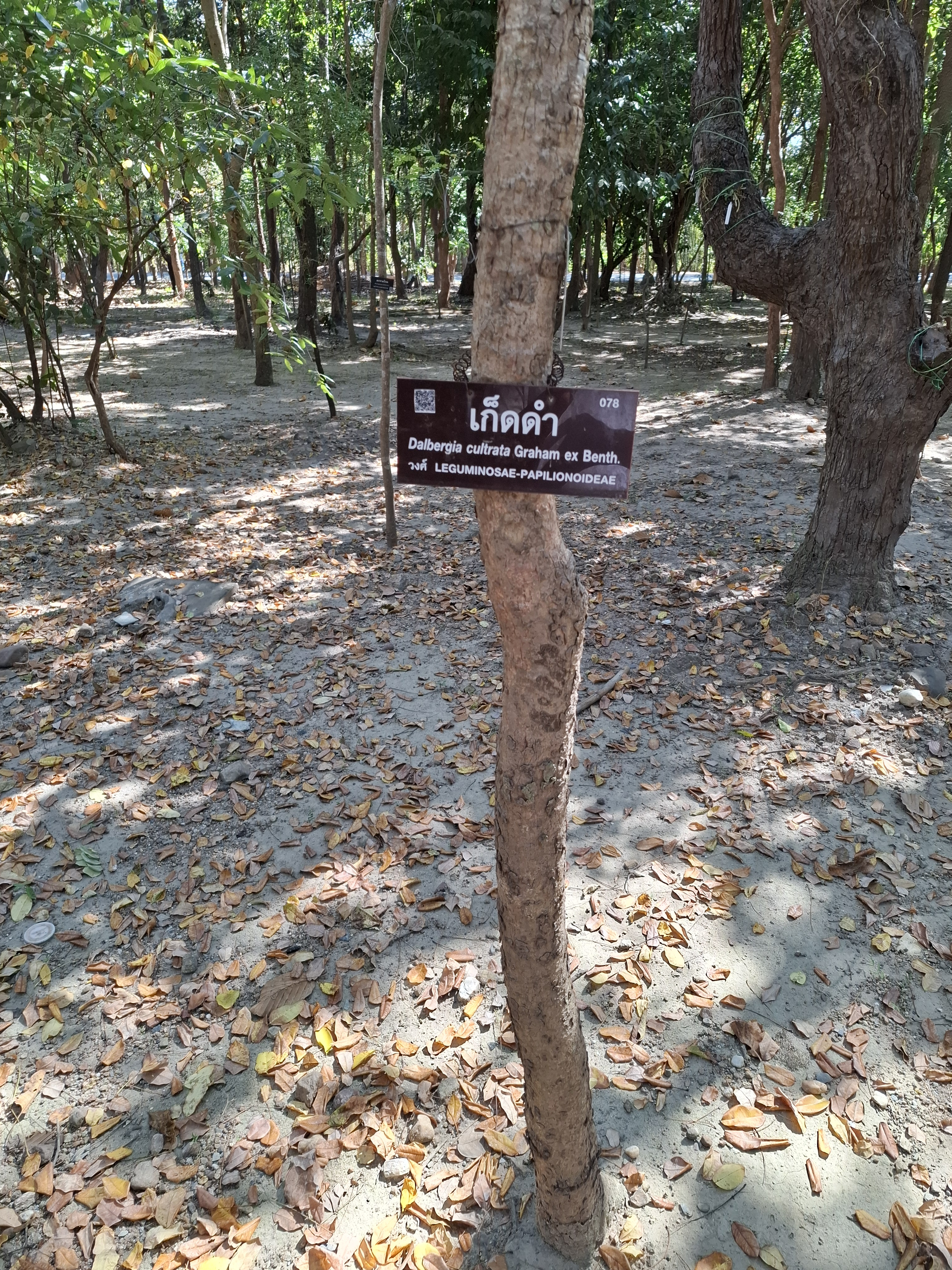
A view of the forest floor
