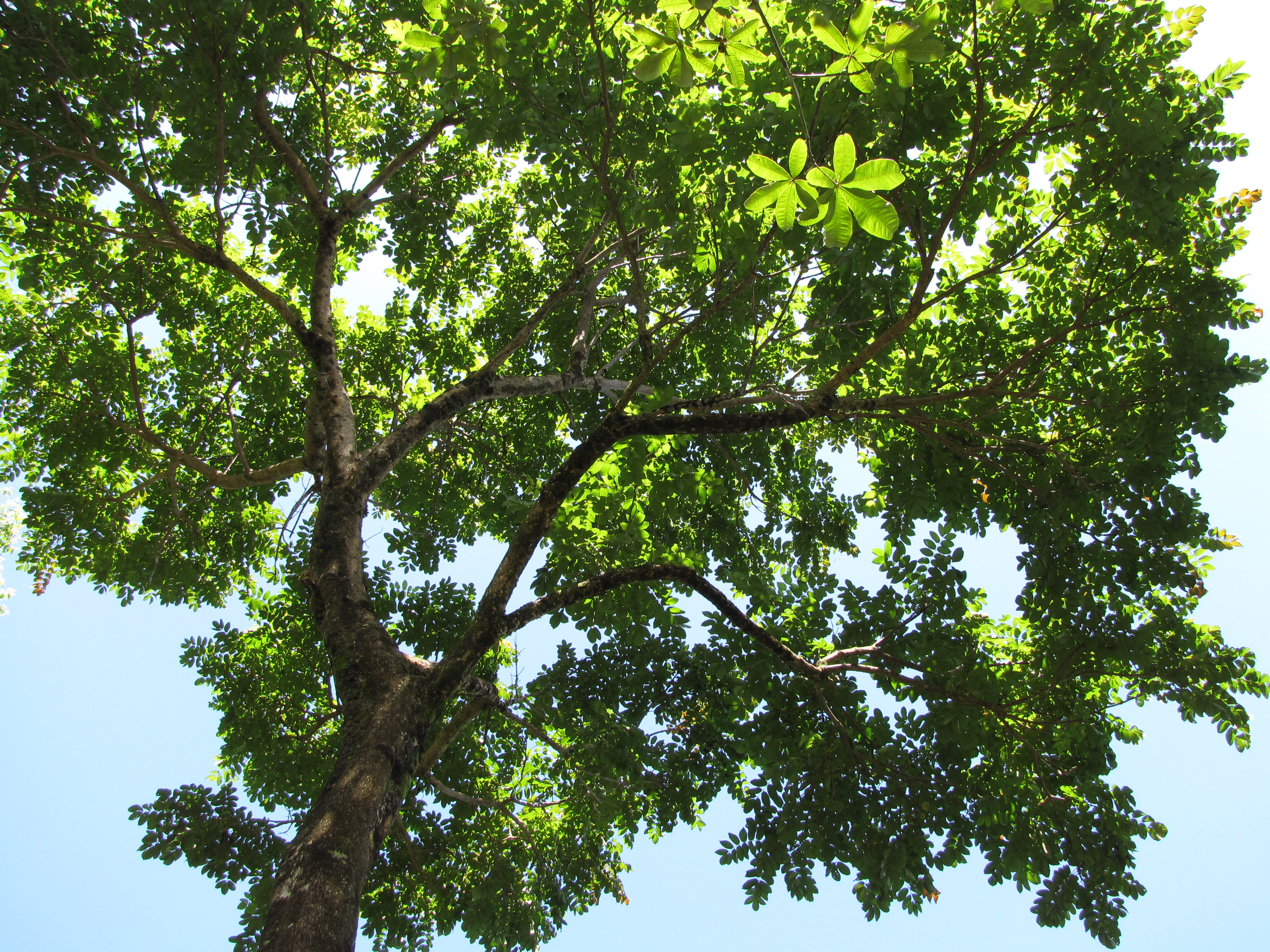

Conservation status
- Critically Endangered (IUCN 3.1)

Scientific classification
- Kingdom: Plantae
- Clade: Embryophytes
- Clade: Tracheophytes
- Clade: Angiosperms
- Clade: Eudicots
- Clade: Rosids
- Order: Fabales
- Family: Fabaceae
- Subfamily: Faboideae
- Genus: Dalbergia
- Species: D. retusa

Binomial name
- Dalbergia retusa Hemsl.

Synonyms
- Amerimnon lineatum (Pittier) Standl.; Amerimnon retusum (Hemsl.) Standl.; Dalbergia hypoleuca Pittier; Dalbergia lineata Pittier

= Dalbergia retusa =

Species of legume

Dalbergia retusa (Caviuna, Cocobolo, Cocobolo Prieto, Funeram, Granadillo, Jacarandáholz, Nambar, ñamba, Nicaraguan Rosewood, Palisander, Palissandro, Palo Negro, Pau Preto, Rosewood, Urauna) is a plant species in the family Fabaceae. It is found in Pacific regions of Central America, ranging from Colombia through Central America to southern Mexico. It produces the cocobolo wood.

== Usage ==
The tree's lustrous, dense and typically reddish wood has been prized for usage in gunstocks, furniture, and musical instruments. The Wounaan people have historically used wood from Dalbergia retusa to carve ceremonial staffs used in traditional medicine.

Retusin, an O-methylated flavonoid, is produced by the tree.

== See also ==
- Na 'Aina Kai Botanical Gardens
- Rosewood
