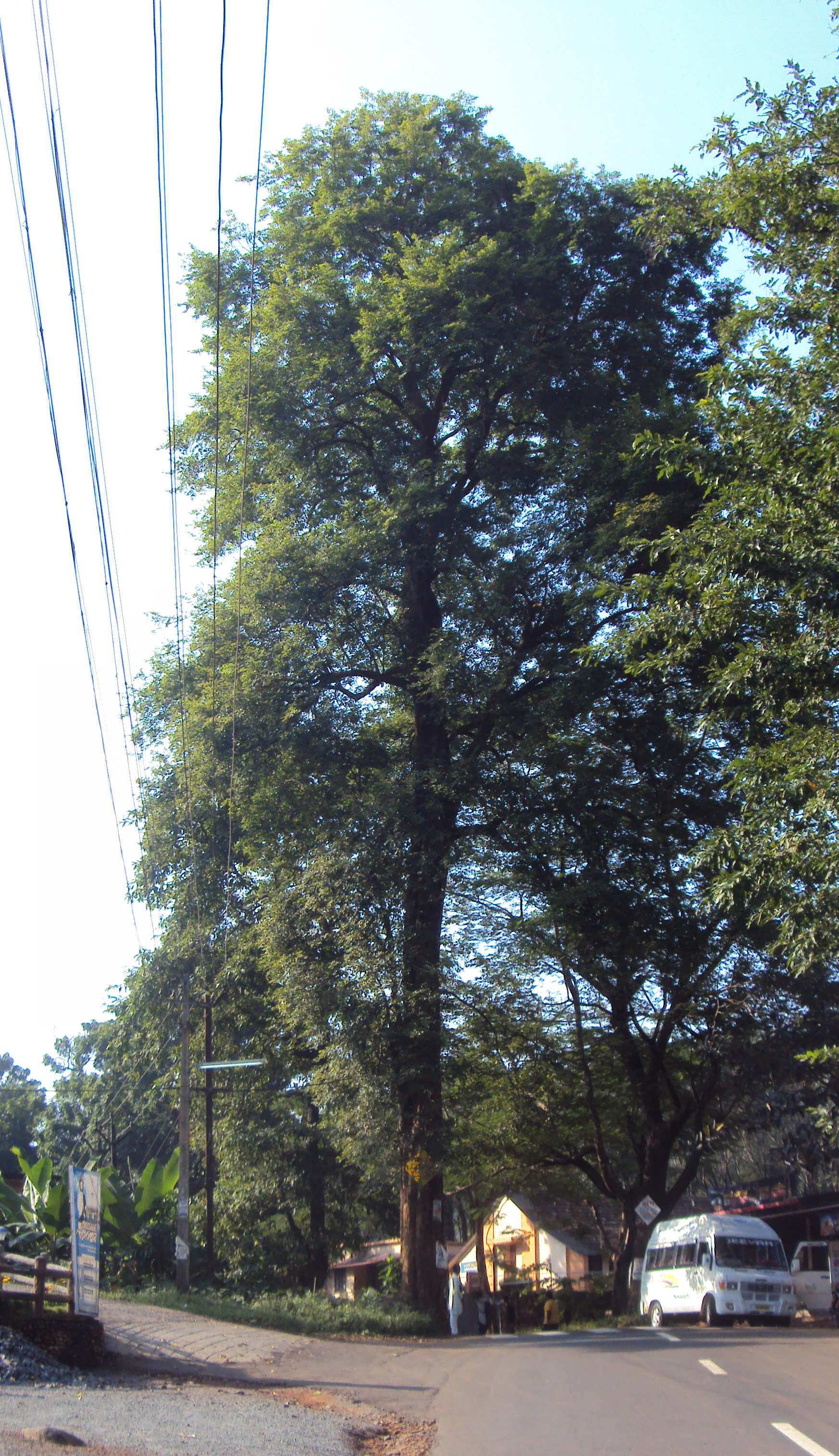
- Dalbergia latifolia growing as a street tree in Peravoor, India.

Conservation status
- Vulnerable (IUCN 3.1)

Scientific classification
- Kingdom: Plantae
- Clade: Tracheophytes
- Clade: Angiosperms
- Clade: Eudicots
- Clade: Rosids
- Order: Fabales
- Family: Fabaceae
- Subfamily: Faboideae
- Genus: Dalbergia
- Species: D. latifolia

Binomial name
- Dalbergia latifolia Roxb.

Synonyms
- Amerimnon latifolium (Roxb.) Kuntze; Dalbergia emarginata Roxb.

= Dalbergia latifolia =

Species of flowering plant

Dalbergia latifolia (synonym Dalbergia emarginata) is a premier timber species, also known as the Indian rosewood (Tamil / தமிழ்: Eetti / ஈட்டி) (Telugu / తెలుగు: Irugudu/ ఇరుగుడు). It is native to low-elevation tropical monsoon forests of south east India. Some common names in English include rosewood, Bombay blackwood, roseta rosewood, East Indian rosewood, reddish-brown rosewood, Indian palisandre, and Java palisandre. Its Indian common names are beete, and satisal or sitsal. The tree grows to 40 metres (130 ft) in height and is evergreen, but locally deciduous in drier subpopulations.

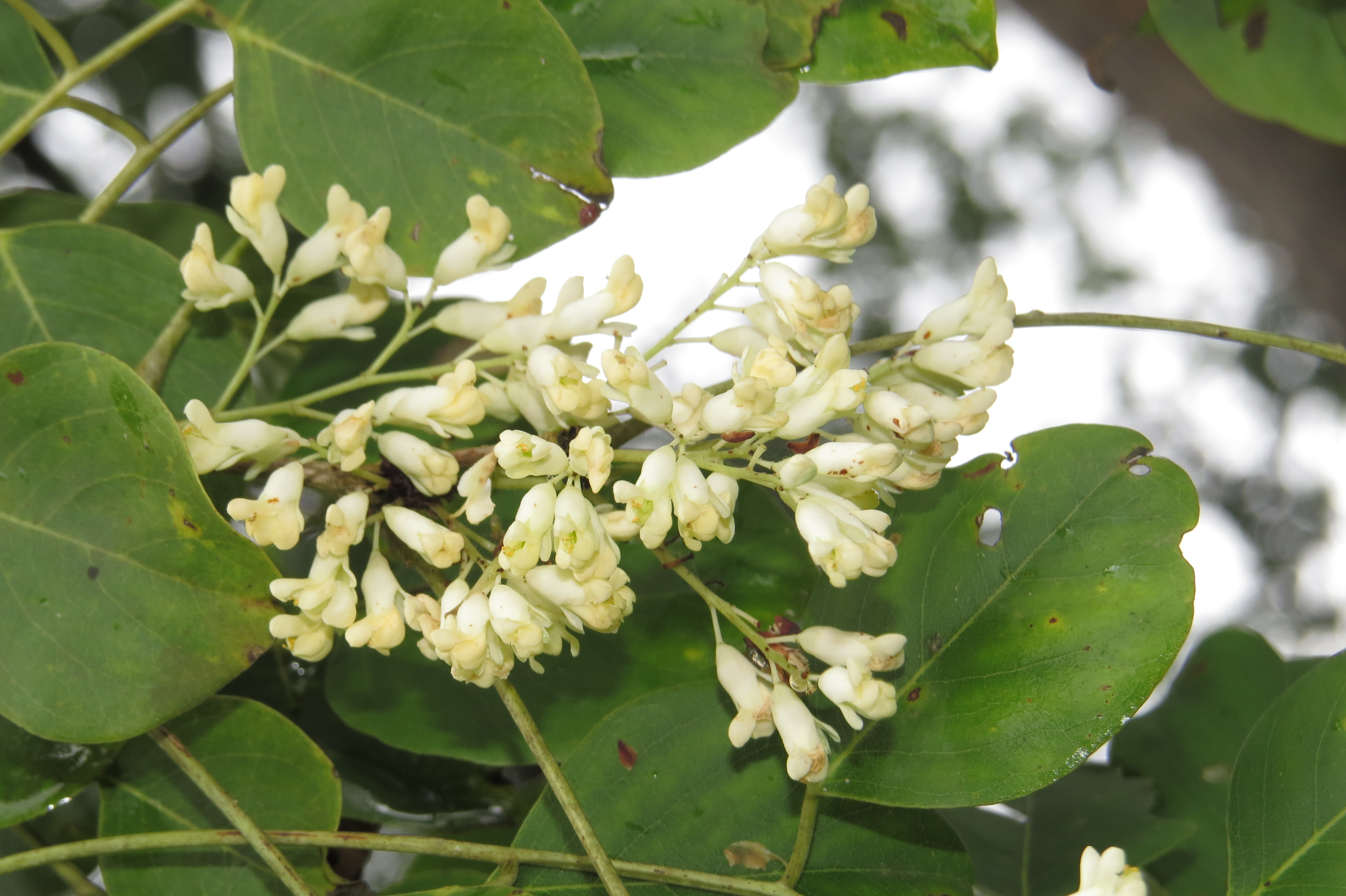
Flowering in Dalbergia latifolia

== Description and biology ==
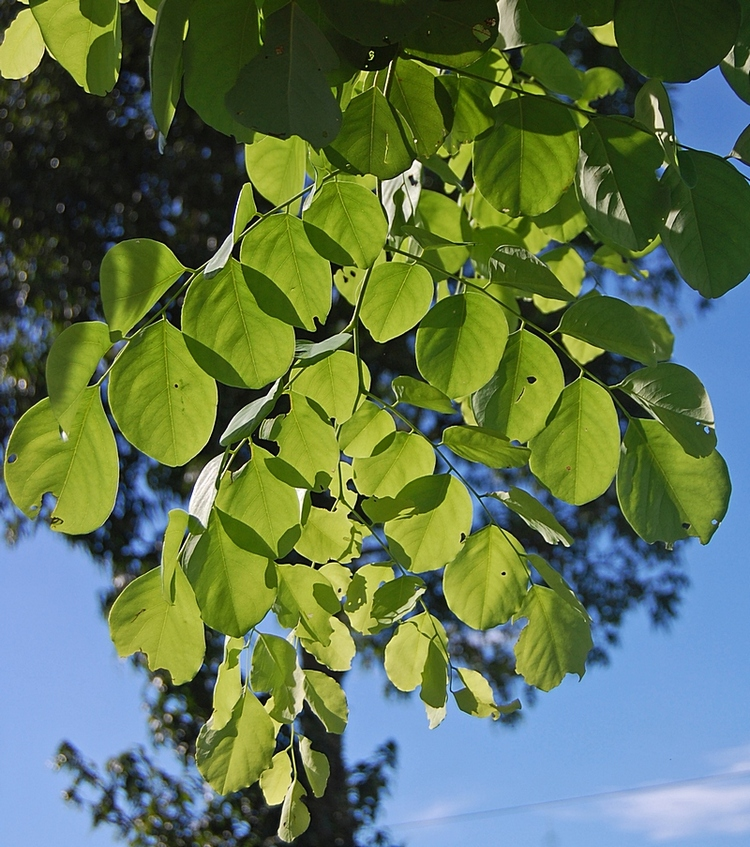
Pinnately compound leaves of Dalbergia latifolia growing in Java.

The tree has grey bark that peels in long fibres, pinnately compound leaves, and bunches of small white flowers. It grows as both an evergreen and a deciduous tree in the deciduous monsoon forests of India making the tree very drought hardy.

Haematonectria haematococca is a fungal pest of the tree, causing damage to the leaves and the heartwood in Javanese plantations. In India, trees may be subject to serious damage from a species of Phytophthora, a water mold genus.

Germplasm resources for D. latifolia are maintained by the Kerala Forest Research Institute in Thrissur, Kerala, India.

== Uses ==
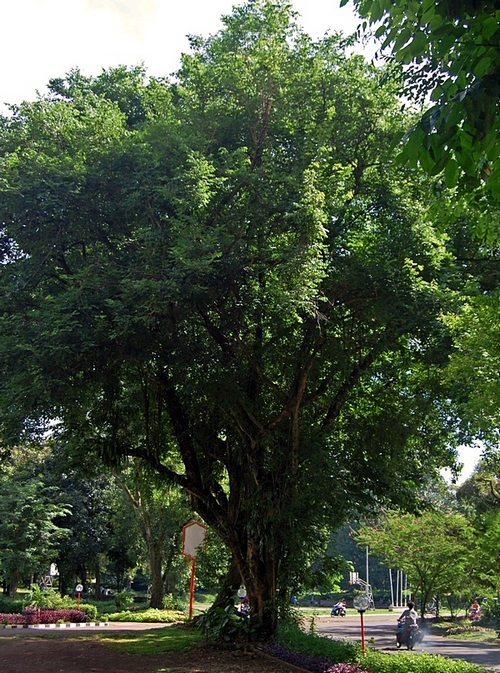
A Dalbergia latifolia tree stands on roadside at Bogor, Java

The tree produces a hard, durable, heavy wood that, when properly cured, is durable and resistant to rot and insects. It is grown as a plantation wood in both India and Java, often in dense, single species groves, to produce its highly desirable long straight bole. Wood from the tree is used in premium furniture making and cabinetry, guitar bodies and fretboards, exotic veneers, carvings, boats, skis, and for reforestation.

Under the Indian Forest Act, 1927 the exportation of lumber products from wild harvested D. latifolia is illegal. There exists an international high demand and price for the wood due to its excellent qualities of having a long straight bole, its strength, and its high density. However, the tree is slow-growing; Javanese plantations were started in the late nineteenth century, but, due to its slow growth, plantations have not expanded beyond Java and India. Many once popular uses for D. latifolia wood have now been replaced with Dalbergia sissoo wood and engineered rosewoods, for economic purposes in cottage industries.

== See also ==
- Rosewood
