= Erythrina eggersii =

Conservation status
- Endangered (IUCN 3.1)

Scientific classification
- Kingdom: Plantae
- Clade: Embryophytes
- Clade: Tracheophytes
- Clade: Spermatophytes
- Clade: Angiosperms
- Clade: Eudicots
- Clade: Rosids
- Order: Fabales
- Family: Fabaceae
- Subfamily: Faboideae
- Genus: Erythrina
- Species: E. eggersii

Binomial name
- Erythrina eggersii Krukoff & Moldenke

Synonyms
- Erythrina horrida Eggers

Species of legume

Erythrina eggersii is a vine or tree in the family Fabaceae which is commonly known as cock's-spur, espuelo de gallo, or pinon espinoso. It is native to Puerto Rico, the British Virgin Islands (Jost Van Dyke) and the U.S. Virgin Islands, where it is threatened by habitat loss.
