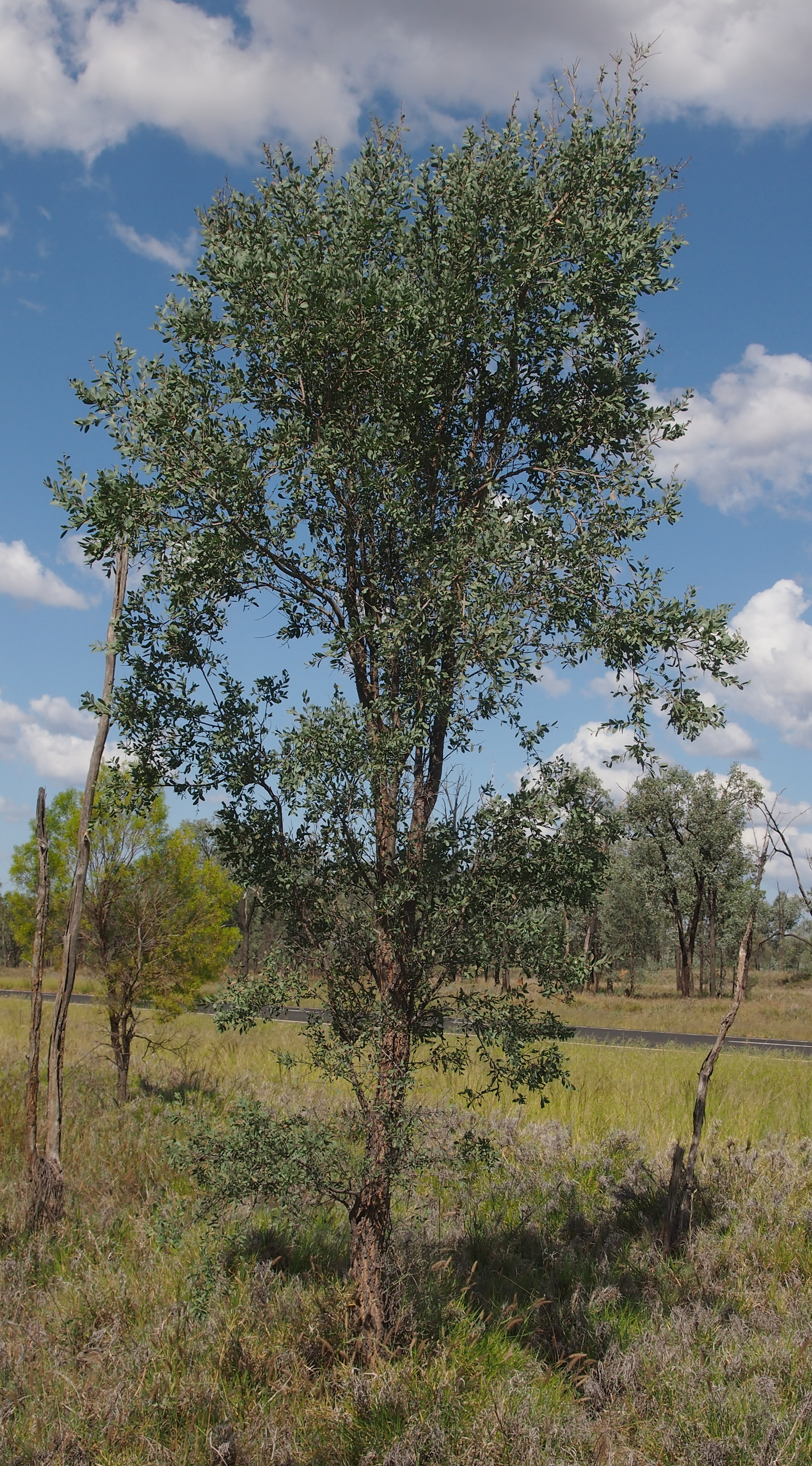
- Habit

Scientific classification
- Kingdom: Plantae
- Clade: Tracheophytes
- Clade: Angiosperms
- Clade: Eudicots
- Clade: Rosids
- Order: Fabales
- Family: Fabaceae
- Subfamily: Caesalpinioideae
- Clade: Mimosoid clade
- Genus: Acacia
- Species: A. excelsa

Binomial name
- Acacia excelsa Benth.
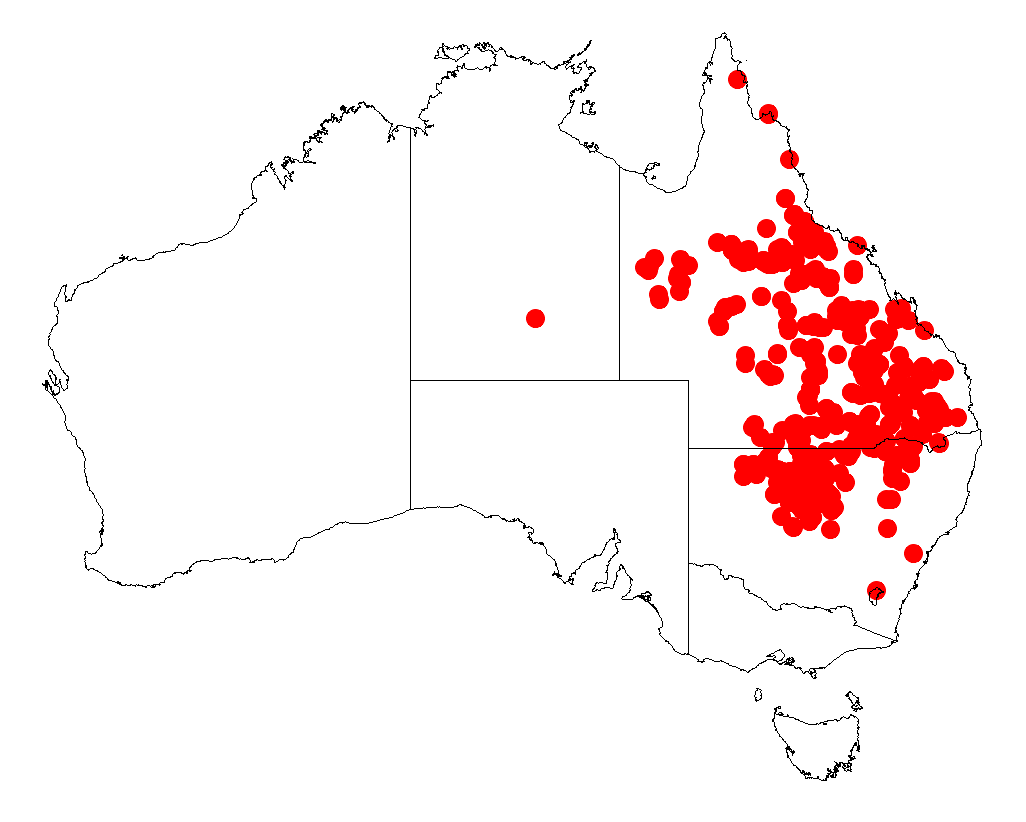
- Occurrence data from AVH

Synonyms
- Racosperma excelsum (Benth.) Pedley; Acacia daintreeana F.Muell.; Acacia excelsa var. daintreana Domin orth. var.; Acacia excelsa var. daintreeaa Pedley orth. var.; Acacia excelsa var. daintreeana (F.Muell.) Domin; Acacia excelsa var. glaucescens Domin; Acacia excelsa var. polyphleba Domin; Acacia excelsa var. typica Domin nom. inval.; Acacia pterocarpa Benth. nom. inval., pro syn.

= Acacia excelsa =

Ironwood

Species of legume

Acacia excelsa, also known as ironwood, rosewood, doodlallie or bunkerman and as dhangayangan in the Gamilaraay language, is a species of flowering plant in the family Fabaceae and is endemic to the north-east of Australia. It is a tree, often with a weeping habit, glabrous branchlets, with narrowly elliptic phyllodes, spherical heads of creamy-white to pale or bright yellow flowers and linear, firmly papery to crusty pods.

== Description ==
Acacia excelsa is a tree that typically grows to a height of up to 20 m (66 ft) sometimes a shrub to 3 m (9.8 ft), often with a weeping habit. The bark is hard, dark grey and fissured and the branchlets glabrous. Its phyllodes are narrowly elliptic, straight to curved downwards and glabrous, mostly 40–65 mm (1.6–2.6 in) long and 3–16 mm (0.12–0.63 in) wide, with three to seven subprominent veins on each side. The flowers are borne in a spherical head in axils on a peduncle 5–15 mm (0.20–0.59 in) long, each head 5–8 mm (0.20–0.31 in) in diameter with 25 to 35 creamy-white to pale or bright yellow flowers. Flowering occurs from March to June, and the pods are linear, flat, up to 110 mm (4.3 in) long and 6–9 mm (0.24–0.35 in) wide, and breaking into one-seeded segments. The seeds are broadly elliptic, 5–6 mm (0.20–0.24 in) long, dull brown without an aril.

== Taxonomy ==
Acacia excelsa was first formally described in 1848 by the botanist George Bentham in Thomas Mitchell's Journal of an Expedition into the Interior of Tropical Australia. The specific epithet (excelsa) means 'tall' and refers to the tall habit of the tree.

In 1978, Leslie Pedley described three subspecies of Acacia excelsa in the journal Austrobaileya, and two of the names are accepted by the Australian Plant Census:

- Acacia excelsa subsp. angusta Pedley has phyllodes 3–5.5 mm (0.12–0.22 in) wide with three main veins.
- Acacia excelsa Benth. subsp. excelsa has phyllodes mostly 8–16 mm (0.31–0.63 in) wide with three to seven main veins.

== Distribution and habitat ==
It has a wide-ranging but scattered distribution throughout inland parts of southern inland Queensland extending into northern and central New South Wales. In New South Wales it is found as far south as Condbolin and as far east as Warialda. It is found growing in sandy loamy soils as a part of open woodland or savannah grassland communities.

- Subspecies angusta is widely scattered from south of Mount Isa to the northwest plains of northern New South Wales Wales, mostly along the western range of subsp. excelsa.
- Subspecies excelsa occurs mainly south of 20°S in Queensland to the Condobolin area of central New South Wales.

== Uses ==
The bark of this species, like all Acacias, contain appreciable amounts of tannins and are astringent and can be used for medical purposes including for the treatment of diarrhoea and dysentery when used internally or used to treat wounds, haemorrhoids or some eye problems when used externally. The trees can also produce gum from the stems which is also taken internally to treat haemorrhoids and diarrhoea. The wood produced by the tree is close-grained, very tough and hard and elastic and is suitable for cabinet-work and instrument fretboards. It was used by Indigenous Australian peoples to make boomerangs and spearthrowers.

== See also ==
- List of Acacia species
