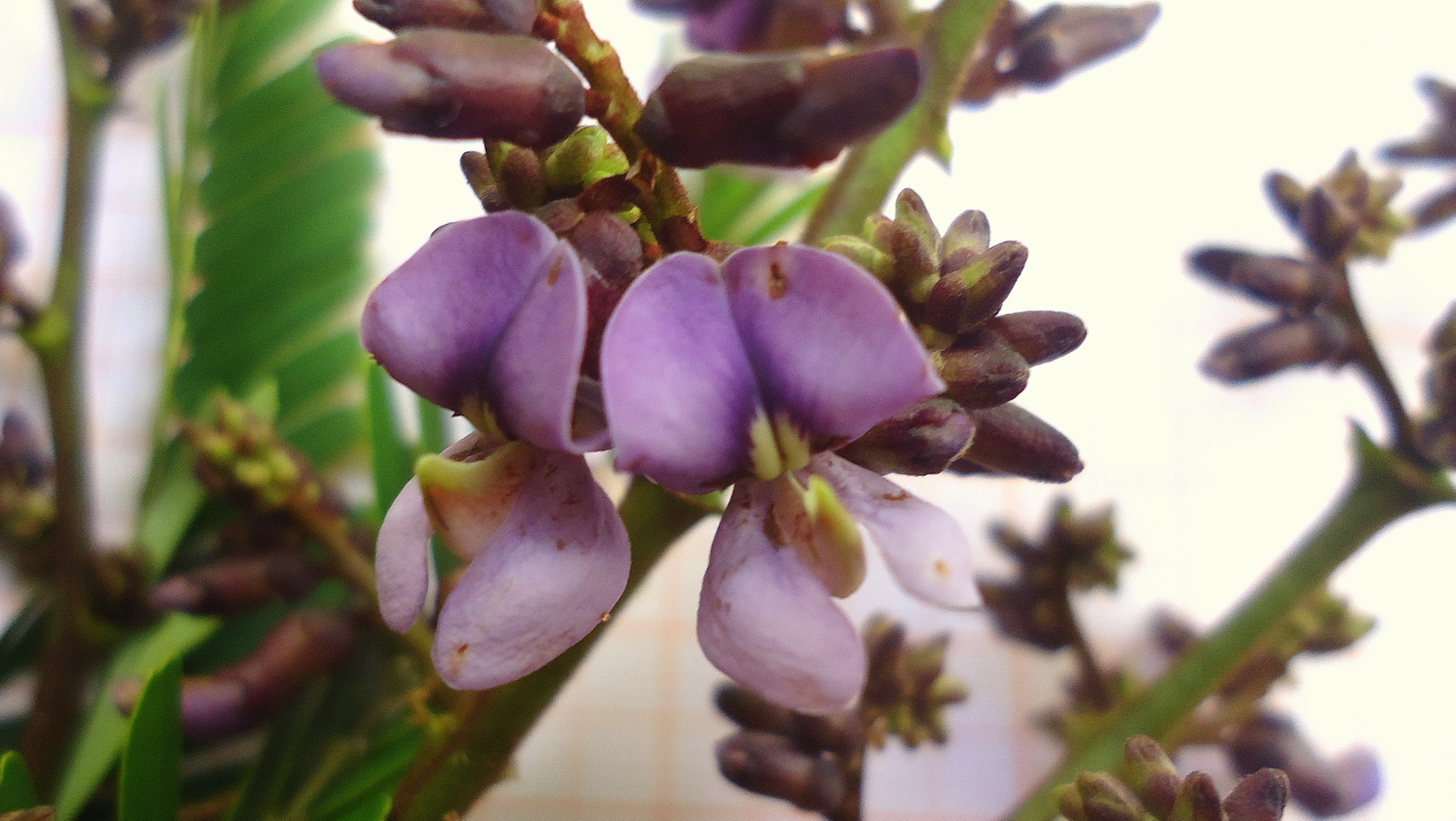
- Machaerium isadelphum

Scientific classification
- Kingdom: Plantae
- Clade: Tracheophytes
- Clade: Angiosperms
- Clade: Eudicots
- Clade: Rosids
- Order: Fabales
- Family: Fabaceae
- Subfamily: Faboideae
- Tribe: Dalbergieae
- Genus: Machaerium; Pers.

Species
- See text

Synonyms
- Drepanocarpus G.Mey. 1818; Nissolius Medik.; Quinata Medik.

= Machaerium (plant) =

Genus of legumes

Machaerium is a genus of flowering plants in the family Fabaceae, and was recently assigned to the informal monophyletic Dalbergia clade of the Dalbergieae. It contains the following species:

- Machaerium aculeatum Raddi
- Machaerium acutifolium Vogel
- Machaerium allemanii Benth.
- Machaerium amazonense Hoehne
- Machaerium amplum Benth.
- Machaerium androvillosum F. L. R. Filardi & H. C. de Lima
- Machaerium arboreum (Jacq.) Vogel
- Machaerium aristulatum (Benth.) Ducke
- Machaerium aureiflorum Ducke
- Machaerium aureum F. L. R. Filardi & H. C. de Lima
- Machaerium berteronianum (Steud.) Urb.
- Machaerium biovulatum Micheli
- Machaerium bondaense Pittier
- Machaerium brachycarpum Pittier
- Machaerium brasiliense Vogel
- Machaerium caicarense Pittier
- Machaerium campylothyrsum Hoehne
- Machaerium cantarellianum Hoehne
- Machaerium capote Dugand
- Machaerium caratinganum Kuhlm. & Hoehne
- Machaerium castaneiflorum Ducke
- Machaerium caudatum Ducke
- Machaerium chambersii Dwyer
- Machaerium chiapense Brandegee
- Machaerium cirrhiferum Pittier—espuela de gallo
- Machaerium cobanense Donn. Sm.
- Machaerium complanatum Ducke
- Machaerium compressicaule Ducke
- Machaerium condensatum Kuhlm. & Hoehne
- Machaerium conzattii Rudd
- Machaerium costulatum Rudd
- Machaerium cultratum Pittier
- Machaerium cuspidatum Kuhlm. & Hoehne
- Machaerium cuzcoense Rudd
- Machaerium darienense Pittier
- Machaerium darlense Pittier
- Machaerium debile (Vell.) Stellfeld
- Machaerium declinatum (Vell.) Stellfeld
- Machaerium densicomum Benth.
- Machaerium dimorphandrum Hoehne
- Machaerium discolor Vogel
- Machaerium dubium (Kunth) Rudd
- Machaerium duckeanum Hoehne
- Machaerium eggersii Hoehne
- Machaerium eliasii Rudd
- Machaerium eriocarpum Benth.
- Machaerium eriostemon Benth.
- Machaerium falciforme Rudd
- Machaerium ferox (Benth.) Ducke
- Machaerium firmum (Vell.) Benth.
- Machaerium floribundum Benth.
- Machaerium floridum (Benth.) Ducke
- Machaerium fluminense Rudd
- Machaerium foliosum Rusby
- Machaerium froesii Rudd
- Machaerium fruticosum (Vell.) Hoehne
- Machaerium fulvovenosum H.C. Lima
- Machaerium glabratum Pittier
- Machaerium glabripes Pittier
- Machaerium glabrum Vogel
- Machaerium goudotii Benth.
- Machaerium gracile Benth.
- Machaerium grandifolium Pittier
- Machaerium guanaiense Rudd
- Machaerium hatschbachii Rudd
- Machaerium hirtum (Vell.) Stellfeld
- Machaerium hoehneanum Ducke
- Machaerium huanucoense Rudd
- Machaerium humboldtianum Vogel
- Machaerium incorruptibile (Vell.) Benth.
- Machaerium inundatum (Benth.) Ducke
- Machaerium isadelphum (E. Mey.) Standl.
- Machaerium jacarandifolium Rusby
- Machaerium jobimianum C. V. Mendonça & A. M. G. Azevedo
- Machaerium juglandifolium Rusby
- Machaerium kegelii Meissner
- Machaerium kuhlmannii Hoehne
- Machaerium lanatum Tul.
- Machaerium lanceolatum (Vell.) J.F. Macbr.
- Machaerium latialatum Pittier
- Machaerium latifolium Rusby
- Machaerium legale (Vell.) Benth.
- Machaerium leiocarpum Vogel
- Machaerium leiophyllum (DC.) Benth.
- Machaerium leucopterum Vogel
- Machaerium lindenianum Benth.
- Machaerium lineatum Benth.
- Machaerium longistipitatum Hoehne
- Machaerium lunatum (L. f.) Ducke
- Machaerium macaense C. V. Mendonça, A. M. G. Azevedo & H. C. Lima
- Machaerium macrophyllum Benth.
- Machaerium madeirense Pittier
- Machaerium martii Tul.
- Machaerium melanophyllum Standl.
- Machaerium microphyllum (E. Mey.) Standl.
- Machaerium milleflorum Pittier
- Machaerium millei Standl.
- Machaerium minutiflorum Tul.
- Machaerium moritzianum Benth.
- Machaerium mucronulatum Benth.
- Machaerium multifoliolatum Ducke
- Machaerium mutisii Rudd
- Machaerium myrianthum Benth.
- Machaerium nicaraguense Rudd
- Machaerium nigrum Vogel
- Machaerium nyctitans (Vell.) Benth.—canela do brejo, espuela de gallo
- Machaerium oblongifolium Vogel
- Machaerium obovatum Kuhlm. & Hoehne
- Machaerium opacum Vogel
- Machaerium orthocarpum Pittier
- Machaerium ovalifolium Rudd
- Machaerium oxyphyllum Gand.
- Machaerium paniculatum Benth.
- Machaerium papilisetosum Hoehne
- Machaerium paraense Ducke
- Machaerium paraguariense Hassl.
- Machaerium parvifolium Rudd
- Machaerium pedicellatum Vogel
- Machaerium penduliflorum Rudd
- Machaerium peruvianum J.F. Macbr.
- Machaerium pilosum Benth.
- Machaerium piresii Rudd
- Machaerium polyphyllum (Poir.) Benth.
- Machaerium pseudotipe Griseb.
- Machaerium puberulum Benth.
- Machaerium punctatum Pers.
- Machaerium quinatum (Aubl.) Sandwith
- Machaerium rectipes Pittier
- Machaerium robiniifolium (DC.) Vogel
- Machaerium robsonnianum F. L. R. Filardi & H. C. de Lima
- Machaerium rogaguense Rusby
- Machaerium salvadorense (Donn. Sm.) Rudd
- Machaerium salzmannii Benth.
- Machaerium saraense Rudd
- Machaerium scleroxylon Tul.
- Machaerium seemannii Seem.
- Machaerium sieberi Benth.
- Machaerium spicatum Kuhlm. & Hoehne
- Machaerium spinosum (Vell.) Benth.
- Machaerium splendens Vogel
- Machaerium stipitatum (DC.) Vogel
- Machaerium striatum I.M. Johnst.
- Machaerium stygium Lindm.
- Machaerium subrhombiforme Rudd
- Machaerium ternatum Kuhlm. & Hoehne
- Machaerium tolimense Rudd
- Machaerium tortipes Hoehne
- Machaerium tovarense Pittier
- Machaerium trifoliolatum Ducke
- Machaerium triste Vogel
- Machaerium truxillense Pittier
- Machaerium uncinatum (Vell.) Benth.
- Machaerium uribei Rudd
- Machaerium vellosianum Benth.
- Machaerium verrucosum Vogel
- Machaerium vestitum Vogel
- Machaerium villosum Vogel—jacarandá-do-cerrado
- Machaerium violaceo-purpureum Duchass. & Walp.
- Machaerium violaceum Vogel
- Machaerium viridipetalum Ducke
- Machaerium whitfordii J.F. Macbr.

== Phytochemicals ==
Machaerium multiflorum contains Machaeriols such as Machaeriol A and Machaeridols such as Machaeridol A which are hexahydrodibenzopyrans structurally related to Tetrahydrocannabinol and Hexahydrocannabinol with bibenzyl and benzofuran tailchains instead of pentyl. These compounds have been studied for their antibiotic and anti parasitic activity. It's been implicated that other Machaerium species may contain similar compounds.
