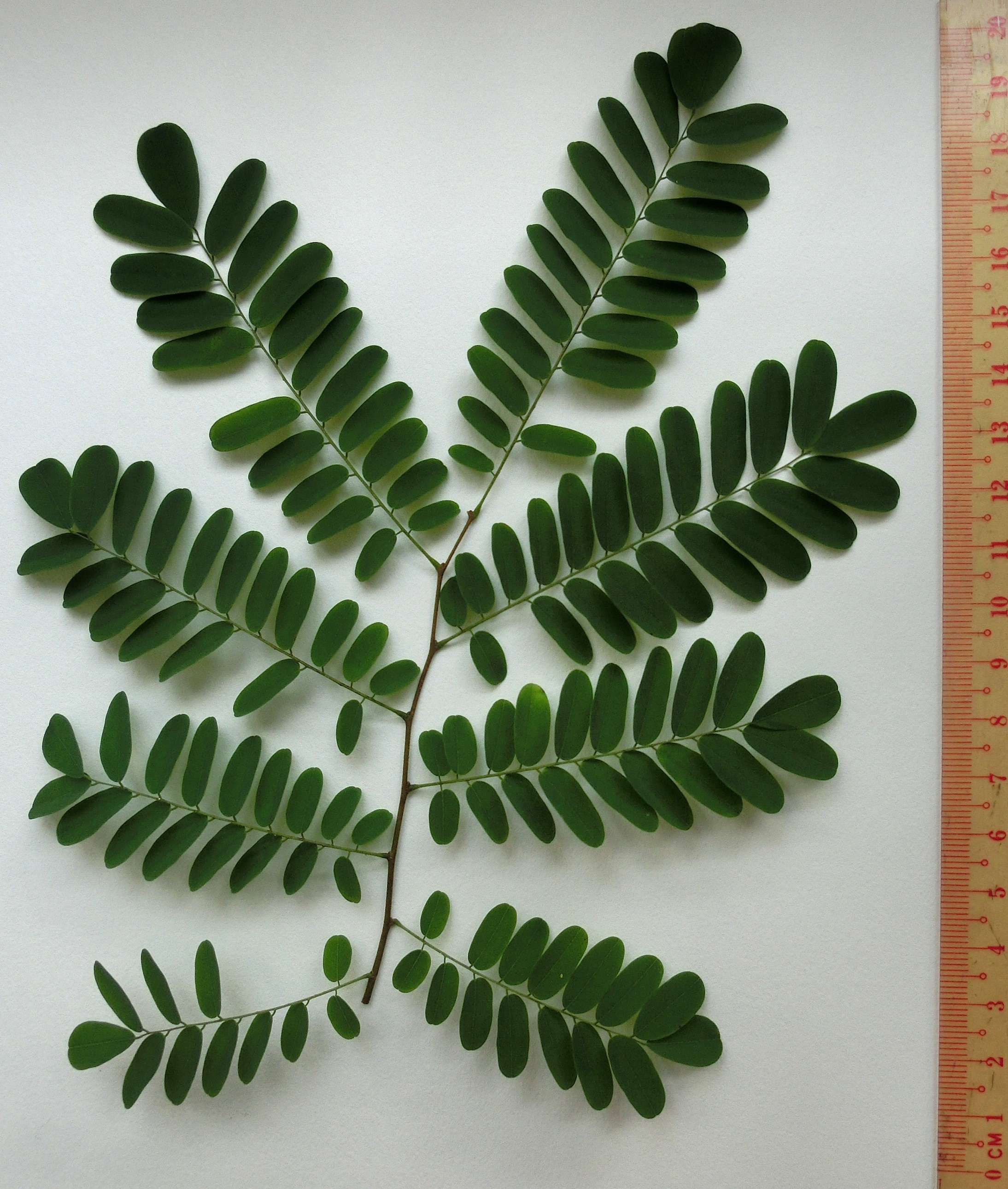
- Leaves
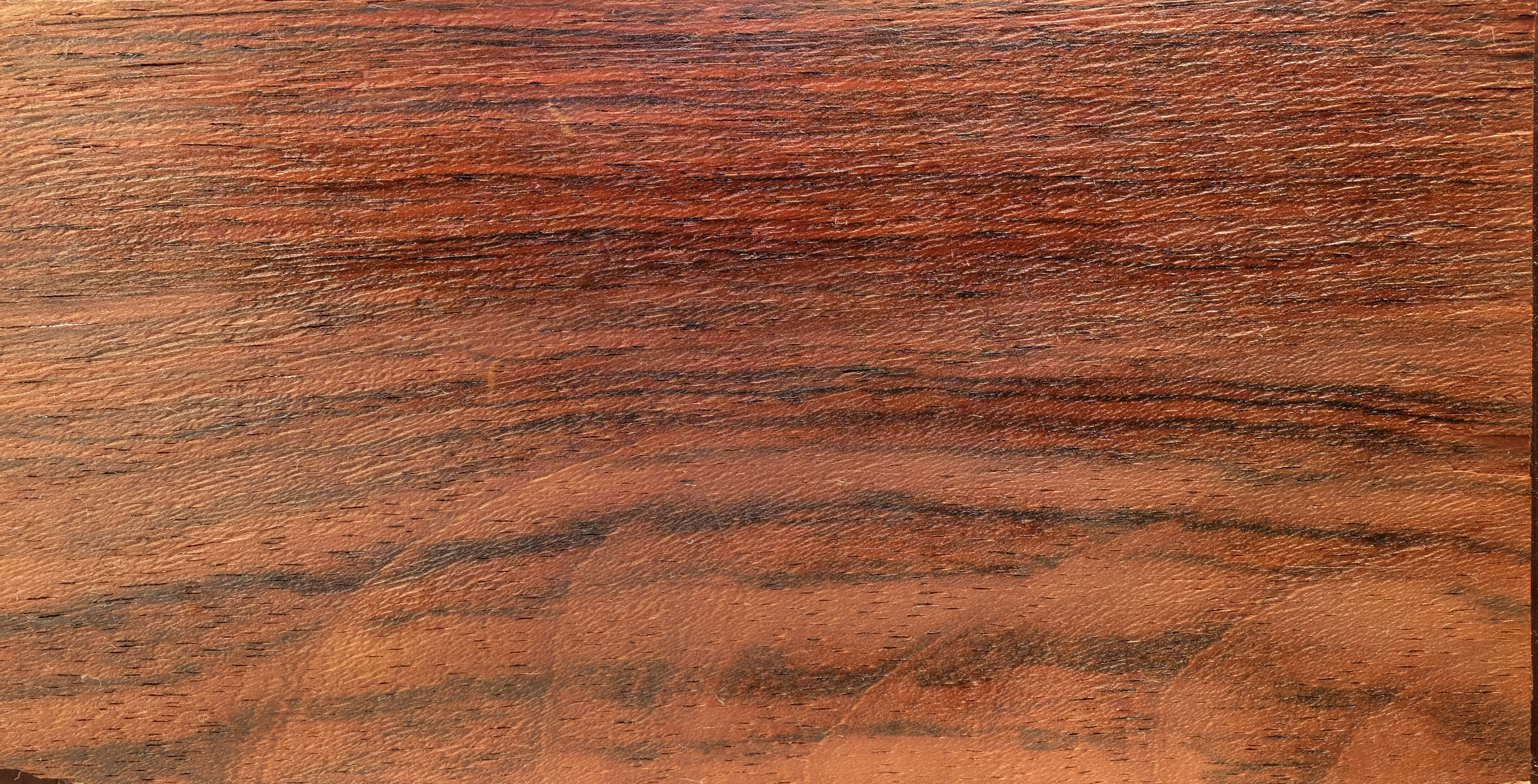
- A veneer cut made of Dalbergia nigra.

Conservation status
- Vulnerable (IUCN 2.3)
- CITES Appendix I (CITES)

Scientific classification
- Kingdom: Plantae
- Clade: Tracheophytes
- Clade: Angiosperms
- Clade: Eudicots
- Clade: Rosids
- Order: Fabales
- Family: Fabaceae
- Subfamily: Faboideae
- Genus: Dalbergia
- Species: D. nigra

Binomial name
- Dalbergia nigra (Vell.) Allemão ex Benth.

Synonyms
- Drepanocarpus microphyllus Wawra; Miscolobium nigrum Allemao; Pterocarpus niger Vell.

= Dalbergia nigra =

Species of legume

Dalbergia nigra, commonly known as the Bahia rosewood, jacarandá-da-Bahia, Brazilian rosewood, Rio rosewood, jacarandá-do-brasil, pianowood, caviúna, graúna, jacarandá-una or obuina is a species of legume in the family Fabaceae.

== Description ==
Dalbergia nigra produces a very hard and heavy wood, characteristically varied in colour from brick red through various shades of brown (medium to nearly black). Pieces that feature veins of black colouration called spider webbing or landscape grain are especially prized. Another distinguishing feature is its outstanding resonance. An evenly cut piece that is tapped emits a bright metallic ring that sustains. This property, combined with its beauty, has made Brazilian rosewood a favourite of musical instrument makers for centuries.

Brazilian rosewood is highly resistant to insect attacks.

There are many species in the genus Dalbergia that can be confused with Dalbergia nigra, but the latter can be recognised by its colour and resin. It may also be confused with Machaerium, which has a more compact parenchyma and lack large pores.

Very little is known about the ecology and reproduction of the Brazilian rosewood.

== Former uses ==
The wood of this species has been much sought after since it was first introduced to the European and subsequently the world market, hundreds of years ago. Dalbergia nigra became popular in high grade furniture, such as that produced during the Regency period of late 18th and early 19th centuries—and more recently by Scandinavian makers, who produced furniture in the Danish Modern style. This species has also been used in various musical instruments, decorative wood-ware, knife handles and turnery. Much of the most highly figured material was sliced into veneers, which decorated items such as domestic and office furniture, wall panels, and piano cases; it was also a favourite of marquetry artists.

Old growth Brazilian rosewood remains highly prized by classical and steel string guitar makers, who regard it as perhaps the best sounding wood for guitar backs and sides. It was used in instruments as long ago as the late Renaissance and Baroque eras, when luthiers used it for lute backs (ribs) and various parts of other stringed musical instruments. It was also used in woodwind instruments, such as bassoons, flutes, and recorders.

== Habitat and distribution ==
Dalbergia nigra is endemic to Brazil, and native to the Bahia interior forests ecoregion.

It is endemic to the Atlantic Forest biome of southeastern Brazil, and found only in southern Bahia, Espírito Santo, Minas Gerais, and Rio de Janeiro states.

It needs a habitat of wet and damp forest on rich soils to thrive.

== Conservational status ==
Dalbergia nigra is listed as vulnerable on the international IUCN Red List. The trees' regeneration rates among existing populations are poor, possibly because the seeds of the few remaining fruiting trees are heavily predated by rodents. In addition it is threatened by habitat loss, since most of the plant's forest habitats have been converted to farmland. Due to its endangered status, it was CITES-listed on June 11, 1992, in Appendix I (the most protected), and trade in it is restricted.

== Sources ==
- ARKive.org: Dalbergia nigra (Brazilian Rosewood)
