= Santalin =

Pigments from red sandalwood

- Santalin A

- Santalin B

Identifiers
CAS Number	A: 38185-48-7; B: 51033-46-6
3D model (JSmol)	B: Interactive image
EC Number	A: 253-817-1
PubChem CID	A: 5490179; B: 5490285
UNII	A: M7S05DR0QK
CompTox Dashboard (EPA)	A: DTXSID30959113; B: DTXSID50965312
- InChI: A: Key: PAQLVBBEBYHSEA-UHFFFAOYSA-N; B: InChI=1S/C34H28O10/c1-40-27-13-18(35)6-7-19(27)30-20-14-29(42-3)32(39)34(43-4)31(20)22-11-17-12-24(37)25(38)15-26(17)44-33(22)21(30)9-16-5-8-23(36)28(10-16)41-2/h5-8,10-15,35-38H,9H2,1-4H3 Key: WLDGLUYONPYMAV-UHFFFAOYSA-N
- SMILES: B: COC1=CC2=C(C(=C3C(=CC4=CC(=C(C=C4O3)O)O)C2=C(C1=O)OC)CC5=CC(=C(C=C5)O)OC)C6=C(C=C(C=C6)O)OC
- Except where otherwise noted, data are given for materials in their standard state (at 25 °C [77 °F], 100 kPa). Infobox references

Santalins (or mistaken referred as sandalins) are a group of naturally occurring red pigments isolated from the heartwood of the red sandalwood tree, Pterocarpus santalinus. Such pigments include at least, santalin A, and santalin B, which have been described chemically and used historically as natural dyes and histological stains.

== Occurrence and chemistry ==
Santalins are found in the heartwood of Pterocarpus santalinus (known as red sandalwood), a traditionally valued timber and dye source. Extracts containing santalins have been used as natural red dyes and have applications in traditional dyeing, historical textiles, and elsewhere (e.g. colorimetric studies). In histology and dye chemistry literature, santalins have been discussed in relation to other redwood pigments, such as santarubins.

Chemically, santalins are polycyclic phenolic pigments. Santalin A and santalin B differ by substitution on the aromatic ring (methoxy vs hydroxy derivatives). Their structures were elucidated by degradative and spectroscopic methods (including NMR and UV–visible spectroscopy).

== Research and bioactivity ==
Studies of red sandalwood constituents have focused mainly on dye chemistry and pigment structure elucidation.

Some related constituents from other wood species have been investigated for biological activity, but santalins themselves are primarily documented as pigments/dyes, rather than studied as bioactive natural products.
