= Algum =

Type of wood

Algum (Hebrew: אַלְגּוּמִּים, romanized: ’algūmmīm) or almug (Hebrew: אַלְמֻגִּים, romanized: ’almuggīm) is a type of wood referred to in the Hebrew Bible.

== Biblical reference ==
According to the First Book of Kings (1 Kings 10:12), and the Second Book of Chronicles (2 Chronicles 2:8; 9:10–11), it was used, together with cedar and pine, in the construction of the pillars of Solomon's Temple and the crafting of musical instruments for use in the temple. Some English translations say that it was used for the steps rather than the pillars and biblical commentators Carl Friedrich Keil and Franz Delitzsch suggest that "we should have to think of steps with bannisters" to make sense of the text.

It is likely that the wood was brought by the ships of Tarshish, sent from the Red Sea port of Ezion-Giber, from the distant country of Ophir, and was very valuable.

== Botanical classification ==
The botanical identity of algum is not known for certain, though some references suggest it may be juniper (Juniperus). Several species of juniper occur in the Middle East region, including Juniperus excelsa (Greek juniper), Juniperus foetidissima (stinking juniper), Juniperus phoenicea (Phoenician juniper), and Juniperus drupacea (Syrian juniper). It is likely that the woods of these species, which are all very similar in woodworking properties, would not have been distinguished from each other in the wood trade. The difficulty in identifying this wood is due in part to uncertainty over the location of the biblical city of Ophir. If Ophir is located in the Philippines, as some think, the wood likely would be red sandalwood or Pterocarpus santalinus.
