= Marojejy National Park =

National park in the Sava region of northeastern Madagascar

- IUCN category II (national park)
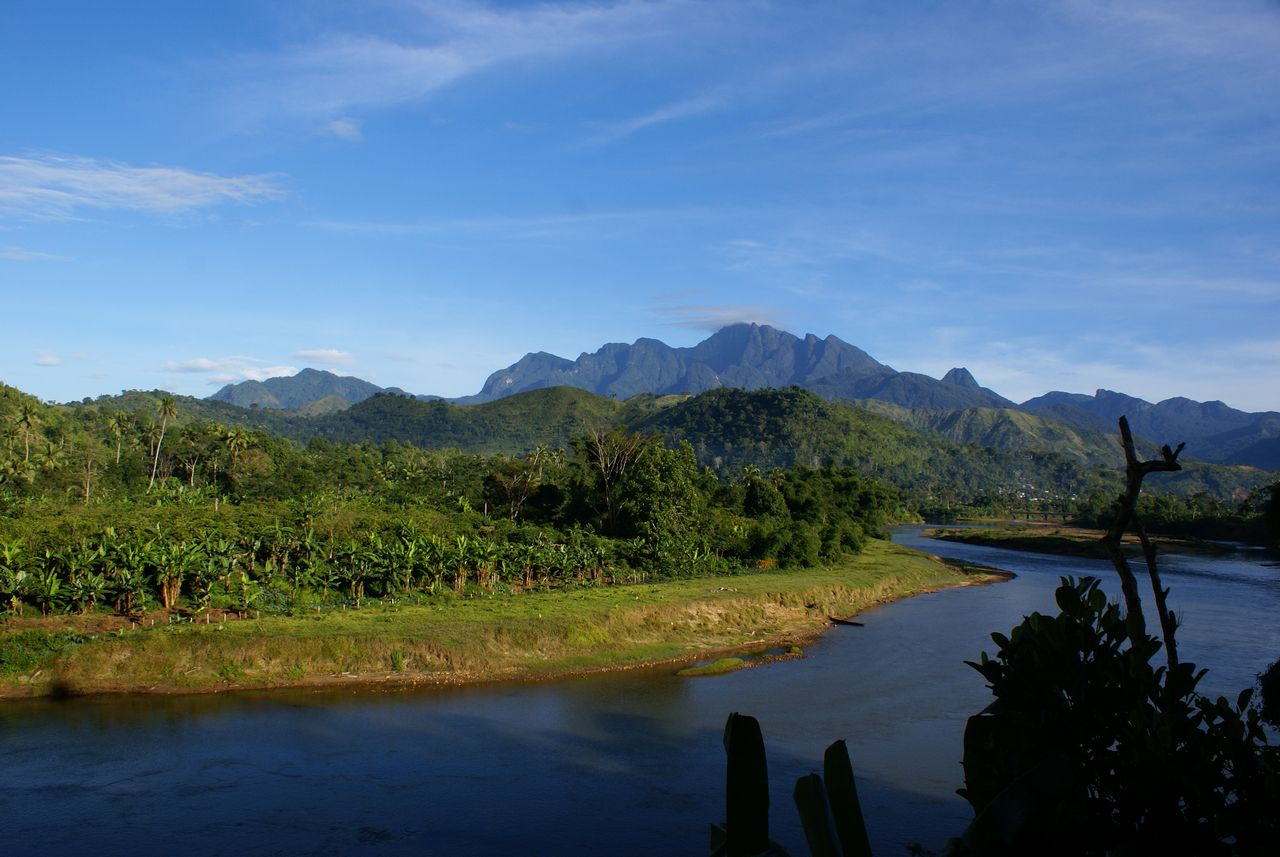
- Marojejy Massif and the surrounding forests

- Location within Madagascar
- Location: Sava region, Madagascar
- Nearest city: Andapa and Sambava
- Coordinates: 14°27′S 49°42′E
- Area: 55,500 ha (214 sq mi)
- Established: 1952 (Natural Reserve); 1998 (National Park)
- Governing body: Madagascar National Parks
- World Heritage site: 2007
- Website: www.webcitation.org/5welJdZVT?url=http%3A%2F%2Fwww.parcs-madagascar.com%2Ffiche-aire-protegee_en.php%3FAp%3D22

Marojejy National Park (/məˈroʊdʒɛdʒiː/) is a national park in the Sava region of northeastern Madagascar. It covers 55,500 ha (214 sq mi) and is centered on the Marojejy Massif, a mountain chain that rises to an elevation of 2,132 m (6,995 ft). Access to the area around the massif was restricted to research scientists when the site was set aside as a strict nature reserve in 1952. In 1998, it was opened to the public when it was converted into a national park. It became part of the World Heritage Site known as the Rainforests of the Atsinanana in 2007. "Unique in the world, a place of dense, jungly rainforests, sheer high cliffs, and plants and animals found nowhere else on earth", Marojejy National Park has received plaudits in the New York Times and Smithsonian Magazine for its natural beauty and rich biodiversity that encompasses critically endangered members of the silky sifaka. To that end, a global consortium of conservation organizations, including the Lemur Conservation Foundation, Duke Lemur Center and Madagascar National Parks, have sought to promote research and conservation programs in Marojejy National Park, neighboring Anjanaharibe-Sud Reserve and Antanetiambo Private Reserve, to protect the endemic flora and fauna that reside in northeastern Madagascar. In addition, these organizations have implemented a variety of community-based initiatives to mitigate human encroachment on the park, such as poaching and selective logging, by encouraging local communities to engage in afforestation and silvicultural initiatives to promote a sustainable alternative to mining, slash-and-burn agriculture, and wood collection.

The wide range of elevations and rugged topography of the massif create diverse habitats that transition quickly with changes in altitude. Warm, dense rainforest can be found at lower elevations, followed by shorter forests at higher elevations, followed still by cloud forest, and topped near the peaks with the only remaining undisturbed mountain scrub in Madagascar. Better growing conditions for plants can be found on the eastern side of the mountains, which receives more rain than the western side. This habitat diversity lends itself to high levels of biodiversity. At least 118 species of bird, 148 species of reptile and amphibian, and 11 species of lemur are known to occur within Marojejy National Park. One of the lemurs, the silky sifaka (Propithecus candidus) is listed among "The World's 25 Most Endangered Primates". The helmet vanga (Euryceros prevostii) is considered the iconic bird species of the park.

One path leads from the entrance of the park to the summit. There are three camps along the route: Camp Mantella at 450 m (1,480 ft) in elevation in lowland rainforest, Camp Marojejia at 775 m (2,543 ft) at the transition between lowland and montane rain forest, and Camp Simpona at 1,250 m (4,100 ft) in the middle of the montane rainforest. Camp Simpona acts as a base camp for the trek to the summit, a route that stretches 2 km (1.2 mi) and can take up to four or five hours to traverse.

== History ==
Marojejy National Park is located in the northeast of Madagascar between the towns of Andapa and Sambava and extends approximately 32 km (20 mi) from east to west and 22 km (14 mi) from north to south. It is centered on the chain of mountains known as Marojejy Massif. Despite a scientific survey of some of the other mountains in the region by the 1929 Mission Zoologique Franco-Anglo-Américaine, Marojejy was not surveyed until 1937 when L.-J. Arragon of the Service Géographique de Madagascar ascended Marojejy Est. Arragon did not conduct any field research during his visit. The massif was not geologically described until after the French botanist Jean-Henri Humbert from the National Museum of Natural History in Paris explored the mountains in 1948. Humbert had previously explored numerous mountain ranges in continental Africa before going to Marojejy. Between November 1948 and November 1950, he spent five months collecting 4,039 dried plant (herbarium) specimens for study. After several expeditions, he published the book "A Marvel of Nature" in 1955, in which he claimed the massif was the most impressive range in all of Madagascar because of its size, floral diversity, and pristine natural state.

Marojejy was set aside as one of Madagascar's strict nature reserves in 1952 largely due to Humbert's enthusiasm and support. Under this protection, only research scientists were permitted to visit the site. In 1998, Marojejy was converted into a national park and thus became open to visitors.

Originally seen as a transition zone between the eastern rainforests and the central highlands, Marojejy is now recognized as having its own unique features, with some of the richest biodiversity on the island. Several studies from the early 1970s through the 1990s surveyed the mountain ecosystems and inventoried the flora and fauna. In 2007, Marojejy was listed as a World Heritage Site as part of the Rainforests of the Atsinanana. Due to illegal logging and trafficking of valuable hardwoods, and especially after the 2009 political crisis in Madagascar, the Rainforests of the Atsinanana was added to the list of World Heritage in Danger in 2010.

=== Park boundaries and size ===
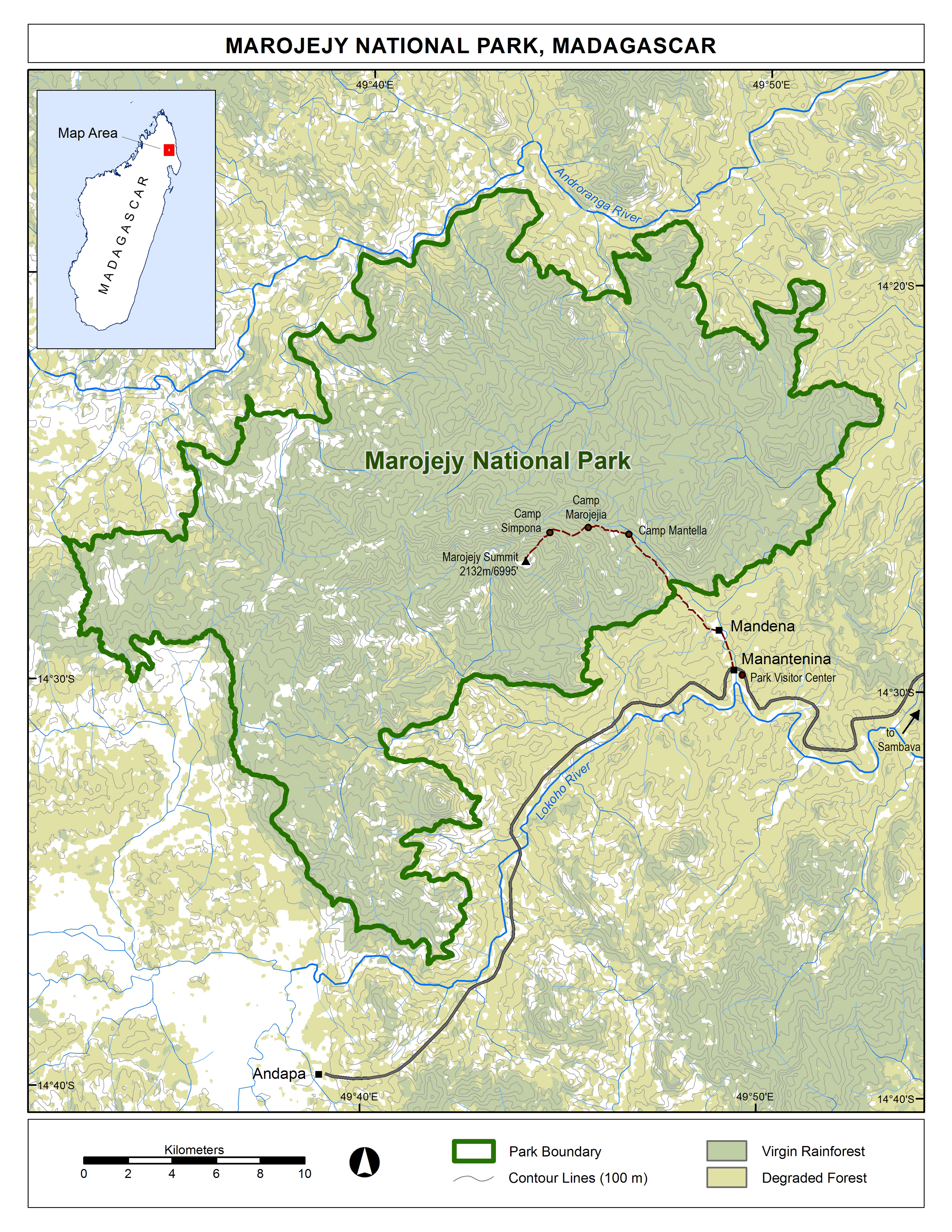
Map of Marojejy National Park

The boundaries of Marojejy National Park were originally established by approximation when the park was established in 1952. With a second decree (no. 66-242) from the government of Madagascar in 1966, the park's status as a strict nature reserve was reaffirmed, and its boundaries were marked by 89 points. From these markers, the size of the park was estimated at 60,150 ha (232.2 sq mi). At the time, two families were living 450 m (1,480 ft) within the park boundaries, which initially was permitted under the conditions that they did not extend their cultivated land into the park or allow others to join them. The families were later expelled for violating these conditions. Many families from the local communities did not understand why such a large area so rich in resources and necessary for their survival was forbidden to them, and between the late 1980s and 1993, they stopped honoring the status of the park. They began clearing the outer edges of the reserve to start plantations of vanilla and coffee. In 1993, the World Wide Fund for Nature (WWF) and the Service des Eaux et Forêts renewed conservation efforts in the area, evicted the people living inside the reserve, and renegotiated the borders with the local community, based on the 1966 decree. Trails and posts were then used to clearly mark the edges of the reserve. In the years following these events, many communities living near the borders of the park have become more involved in forest surveillance, and deforestation has fallen off sharply to only a few hectares a year.

In 1998, the WWF requested that the government of Madagascar relax the restrictions on the reserve to allow for ecotourism, the revenue from which could benefit the people living in the periphery of the park. With a decree (no. 98-375) in May 1998, the reserve became a national park. The boundaries were renegotiated, particularly in the western and northwestern regions of the park, and this time using clear natural landmarks, such as ridge crests, as markers. The size of the park was adjusted to 60,050 ha (231.9 sq mi), with some western communities gaining access to untouched forest zones while communities in the northwest lost agricultural land. Approximately 5,000 ha (19 sq mi) had been illegally cleared within the park and are still part of the park. There are now 91 boundary markers and the boundaries are georeferenced. Intermediate boundary markers are placed between existing markers to demarcate the edges of the park during disputes with the local community.

During October 2005, reports surfaced showing that boundary markers were being moved with the approval of park employees and that areas within the park were being cleared for agriculture. In January 2006, the Park Logistics Coordinator was fired for moving boundary markers while employed as the Park Conservation Agent and selling the 9 ha (0.035 sq mi) of park land to a local farmer for 2 million Malagasy francs (~US$200). In 2010, a new demarcation adjusted the size the park down to 55,500 ha (214 sq mi).

== Topography and habitat ==
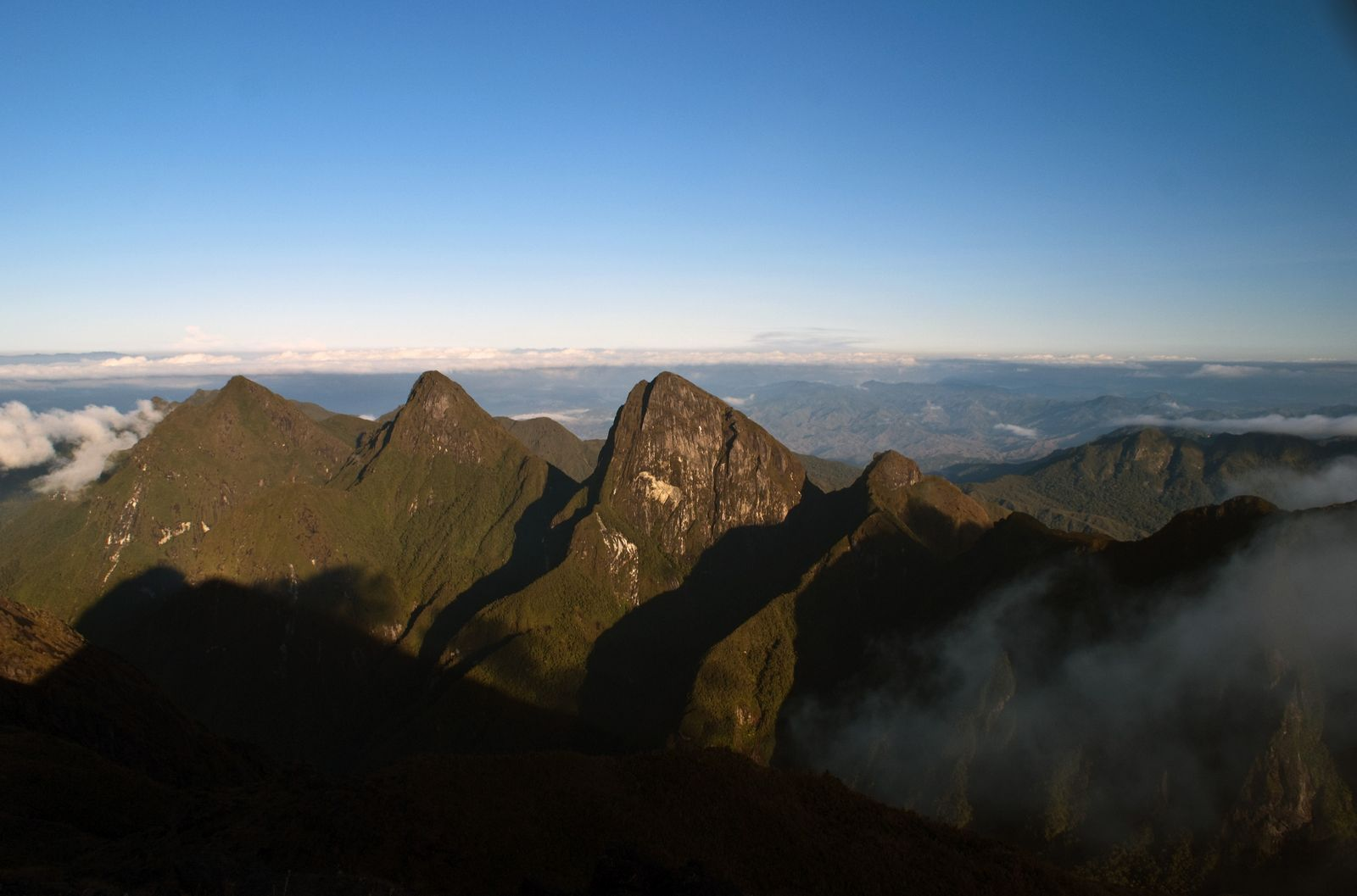
View of the surrounding mountains from the summit of Marojejy Massif at 2,132 m (6,995 ft)

Marojejy National Park covers 55,500 ha (214 sq mi) and protects almost the entire massif, which ranges in elevation from 75 to 2,132 m (246 to 6,995 ft) at the summit. The massif is part of a mountain chain that stretches from Tsaratanana in the northwest to the Masoala Peninsula in the south. The crests of the massif form an east–west line with a series of distinct peaks along its irregular structure, which consists of parallel or divergent crest lines broken apart by steep and irregular slopes. Rising 2,000 m (6,600 ft) over as little as 8 km (5.0 mi), the Marojejy Massif has some of the most precipitous terrain in Madagascar. As a result of this sharp rise in elevation and rugged topography, it has a variety of microclimates and a visible change in habitat, making it one of the few places in the world where cloud-covered rainforest rapidly transitions to high mountain shrubland over a distance that can be covered on foot. Also due to the rugged topography, the vegetative mosaic varies between the crests and slopes of the massif, even at the same elevations. For example, crests and adjoining slopes often have less than 20% of their flowering plant species in common.

Temperatures in the region are fairly constant, with both the daily temperature range and the seasonal range varying only slightly. February is the hottest month, averaging 25 °C (77 °F), while August is the coolest, averaging 19 °C (66 °F). Climbing the peaks, temperature decreases by 1 °C per 200 m of increased altitude (1 °F per 360 ft), and temperatures on the summit decline to 1.5 °C (34.7 °F) in July. The relative humidity for the region hovers around 87% throughout most of the year, although it rises to 97% between March and April. Rain falls every month on the southern side of the mountain, with the region receiving at least 2,300 mm (91 in) of rain annually, making it one of the wettest areas in Madagascar. The northern side of the mountain is more tropical, with a 6-month dry season, and receives about 1,500 mm (59 in) of rain per year. The general region receives the most rainfall during the warm season, from November through April, when heavy rain and occasional cyclones are delivered from the northwest by monsoons. During the cooler season, between May and October, lighter rains are delivered by winds from the southeast.

Landscape and wildlife of Marojejy National Park

Both temperature and rainfall vary significantly by location within the park. Lower temperatures are found at higher elevations, and the eastern slopes of the massif receive most of the rainfall, since the western slopes lie in the rain shadow of the mountain and consequently experience a prolonged dry period. The tops of the ridges experience strong winds and offer poor soil conditions. The effect can be seen in the plant life and their growth rates. The wide range in elevations and the rugged topography also play a crucial role in creation of the varied habitats distributed across the mountain slopes by affecting air temperature, fluctuations in temperature, and humidity levels. The interplay between these factors impacts the growth and development of plants, which form the foundation of the ecosystem. The result is an extremely varied and unevenly distributed forest that covers 90% of the park.

The mountains of both Marojejy and nearby Anjanaharibe-Sud Special Reserve feed several drainage basins, including the Lokoho River, which is sourced from the western and southern slopes of Marojejy, and the Androranga River, which originates from the northern slopes of Marojejy. Both rivers travel towards Sambava and drain into the Indian Ocean. Marojejy is connected to the Anjanaharibe-Sud Special Reserve by the Betaolana corridor, a narrow mid-elevation strip of forest extending west and slightly south.

=== Geology ===
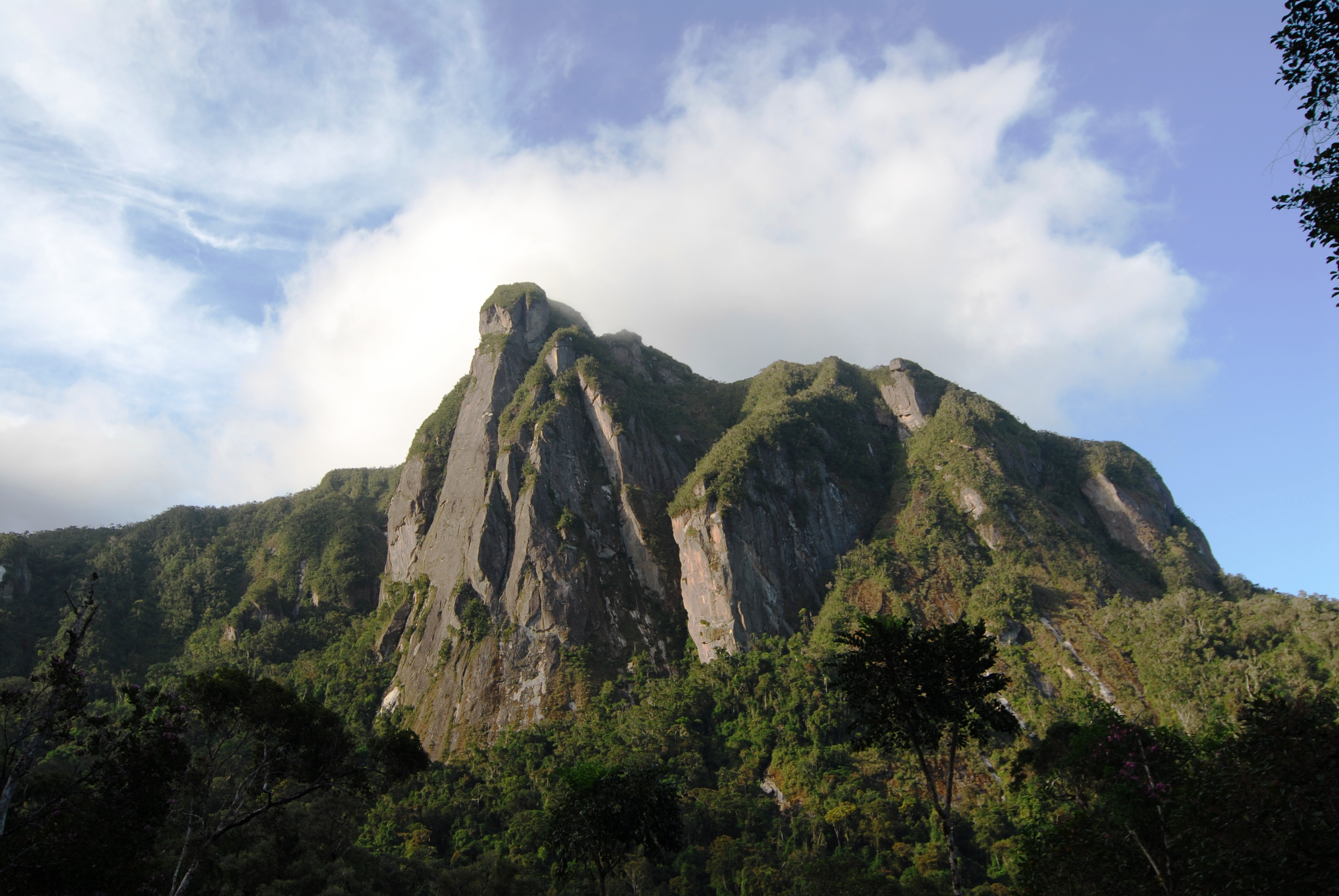
The cliff named Ambatotsondrona, like the rest of the highest peaks at Marojejy, is composed mostly of gneiss bedrock.

As with the rest of Madagascar, the rocks of Marojejy National Park were once part of the supercontinent of Gondwana, which began to break up 160 million years ago to form the southern continents. However, the bedrock of Marojejy formed over 500 million years ago during the Precambrian beneath an ancient mountain range that has since eroded away completely. The bedrock is composed mostly of granitic rocks, although it also contains a significant amount of gneiss, a high-grade metamorphic rock that formed under high pressure and temperature deep beneath the ancient mountain range. In places where heat and pressure were highest, the rock melted completely and eventually recrystallized at depth as granite, an igneous rock. Later, veins of quartz formed in cracks in the bedrock; these are the source of the quartz and amethyst crystals mined in the region today. In more recent geological times, the area's abundant quartzite formed when quartz-rich sands were deposited on the bedrock, and were then buried and recrystallized (metamorphosed). The soil pH is expected to be acidic to neutral.

The highest, most rugged peaks of Marojejy owe their form to the gneiss from which they are made. The gneiss consists of alternating bands of light and dark colored minerals. The light minerals, consisting mostly of quartz and feldspar, are the hardest and most resistant, whereas the dark minerals, which are mostly biotite mica and hornblende, are softer and weather out faster. This layered composition, in combination with the north-facing 45-degree angle at which the rocks are tilted, accounts for the asymmetric character of the peaks. The northern slopes dip moderately, while the southern faces are typically near-vertical cliffs where the rocks fractured counter to the layered grain. The cliff named Ambatotsondrona, with its sheer, south-facing rock wall, is an example.

== Biodiversity ==
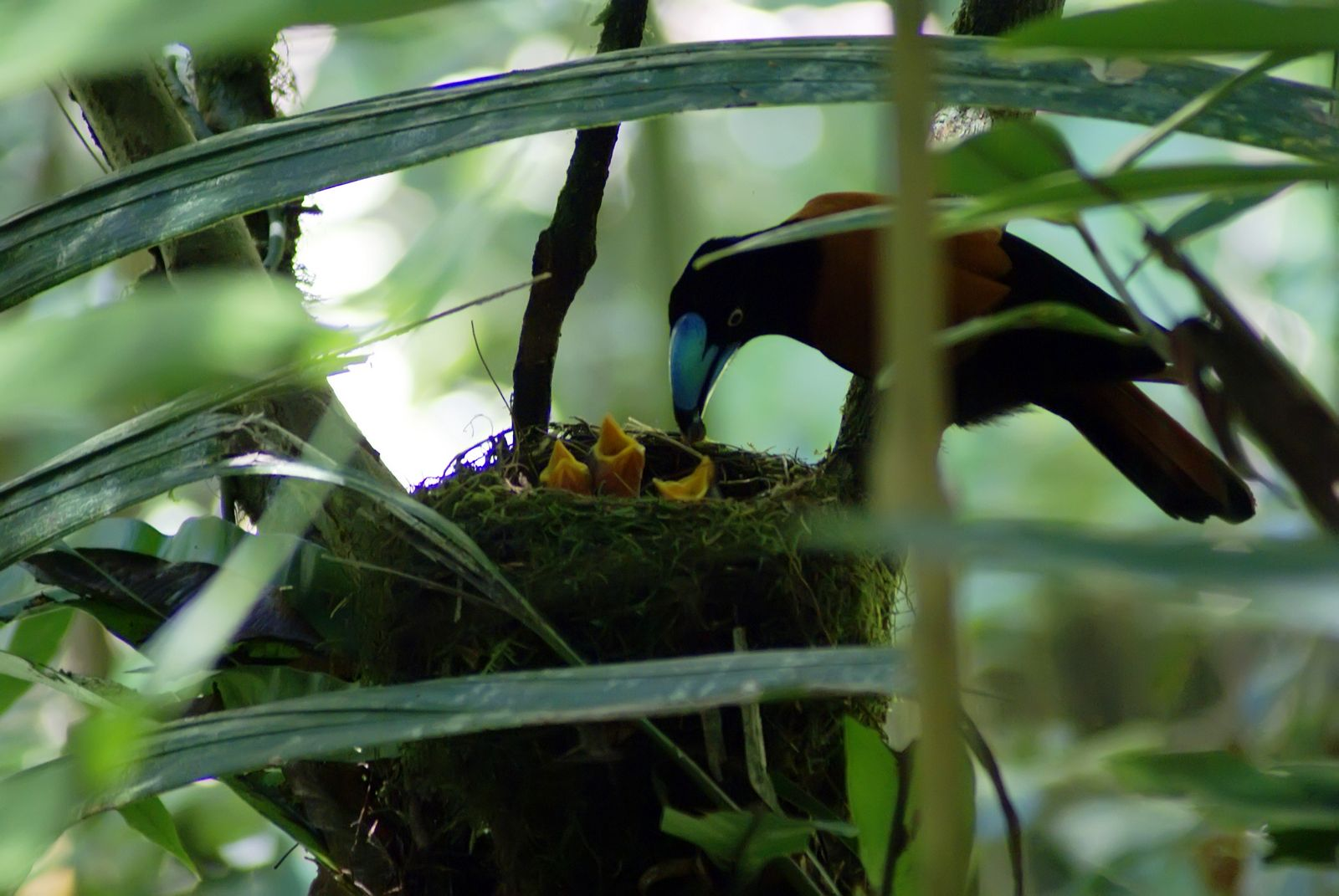
The helmet vanga is the iconic bird species of Marojejy National Park.

Marojejy National Park is noted for its rich biodiversity, which can appeal to both scientist and ecotourist. There are a wide range of habitats within the park, and many of its plants and animals are endemic to the area. Scientific expeditions regularly discover species that are either not previously documented in Marojejy, or in some cases, completely new to science. Some new species are highly endangered. In the case of many large groups, such as invertebrates, very little is known and much remains to be discovered.

=== Flora ===
The vegetation of Marojejy National Park is extremely diverse due to the various microclimates. The microclimates also affect plant growth rates, with the wet eastern slopes showing faster plant growth, the dry western slopes exhibiting slower plant growth, and the plants on the ridge tops hindered by high winds and poor soils. More than 2,000 species of flowering plants (angiosperms) have been discovered at the park so far. At least four plant families are found at all elevations: Clusiaceae and Poaceae are generally common, while Myrsinaceae and Elaeocarpaceae are rare.

There are four basic types of forest found at Marojejy:

- Lowland rainforest: Below 800 m (2,600 ft), species diversity is the highest due to abundant rainfall, consistently warm weather, and protection from strong winds. The canopy of the primary forests is dense with tall trees reaching heights of 25–35 m (82–115 ft). Many tree trunks measure over 30 cm (12 in) in diameter. A great variety of palms, epiphytes, and ferns are also present, with 130 species of fern known from this zone. Secondary growth, which primarily includes bamboo, wild ginger or longoza (genus Aframomum), and traveller's palm (Ravenala madagascariensis), is found in disturbed areas. The most common families of flowering plant are Sapotaceae, Rubiaceae, Euphorbiaceae, and Myrsinaceae. The most common families of plants in the light groundcover are Poaceae, Labiaceae, Acanthaceae, Gesneriaceae, Melastomataceae, and Balsaminaceae. The lowland rainforest region covers 38% of the surface area of the park.

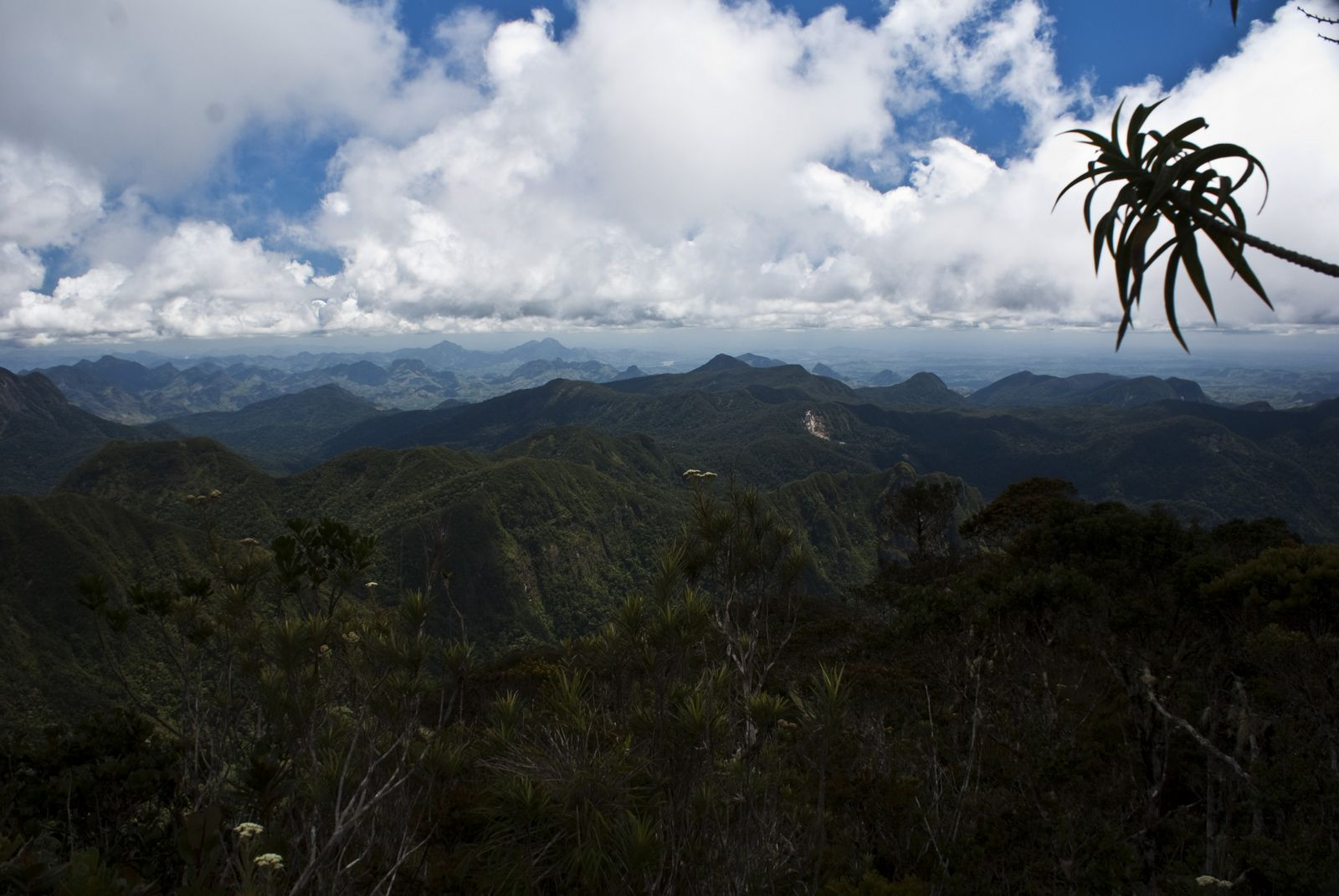
Sclerophyllous montane cloudforest, as seen from the summit, has shorter trees than the forests in the lowland areas.

- Moist montane rainforest: Between 800 and 1,400 m (2,600 and 4,600 ft) and also covering 38% of the surface area of the park, trees and shrubs become increasingly smaller due to lower temperatures and poorer soils, and tree ferns become more abundant as elevation increases. The lower temperatures cause moisture to condense onto surfaces without forming mist. The transition between the lowland rainforests and the mid-altitude rainforest is gradual. The canopy reaches heights of 18–25 m (59–82 ft), and sun-loving epiphytes, shrubs, and other forest floor species take advantage of the elevated light levels. The increased humidity also favors mosses and ferns. The families Rubiaceae, Euphorbiaceae, Myrtaceae, Arecaceae, Pandanaceae, and Burseraceae are the most common in this zone.
- Sclerophyllous montane cloudforest: At 1,400 to 1,800 m (4,600 to 5,900 ft) and covering 11.5% of the surface area of the park, the trees are significantly shorter, gnarled and stunted, with the canopy extending to a maximum height of only 10 or 15 m (33 or 49 ft). The most common plant families are Lauraceae, Rubiaceae, Clusiaceae, and Araliaceae. The ground layer in the cloud forest is rich, and moss and lichen drape the branches of the trees. At least 122 species of fern are found in this zone. Temperatures are lower, and heavy clouds brought in by eastern winds blanket the forest. Endemism is very high at this altitude, particularly between the various peaks due to long isolation. The area is also highly susceptible to fire due to its thick layer of humus.
- Montane scrub: Above 1,800 m (5,900 ft) on only 1.5% of the surface area of the park, the last remaining mountain scrub in Madagascar can be found. Unlike all other high mountain scrub on the island, it has not been altered by fire. The region has an open, tundra-like cover, over thin, rocky soils. Soil conditions, along with the cool temperatures, windy conditions, and low rainfall limits the vegetation, which reaches a maximum height of 2 m (6.6 ft). Low, dense thickets of shrubs dominate, although terrestrial orchids and miniature palms and bamboos are also present. The dominant families of plant are Poaceae, Ericaceae, Asteraceae, Balsaminaceae, Cunoniaceae, and Clusiaceae.

Of the many plant species found in Marojejy, 35 are palms, several of which are critically endangered and have extremely low populations. Only three of these palm species can be found outside of Madagascar, and seven can only be found at Marojejy. More than 275 fern species are present in the rainforests of the massif, 18 of which are tree ferns and seven are found only at Marojejy. Many of these fern species are very rare and have highly restricted distributions.

Marojejy also contains several types of rare rosewood and palisandre (genus Dalbergia), all of which are endemic to Madagascar. Rosewood, or andramena in Malagasy, is a type of hardwood with a lustrous deep red color, while palisandre, such as Dalbergia madagascariensis, lacks the red color. Of the three species of Dalbergia found in Marojejy, D. madagascariensis and D. baronii are listed as "vulnerable" on the IUCN Red List, while D. louvelii is listed as "endangered". The park has few large specimens of the former two due to overexploitation, and specimens are rarely found in the surrounding 5 km (3.1 mi) surrounding the park. The latter, D. louvelii, is not found outside of the park.

=== Fauna ===
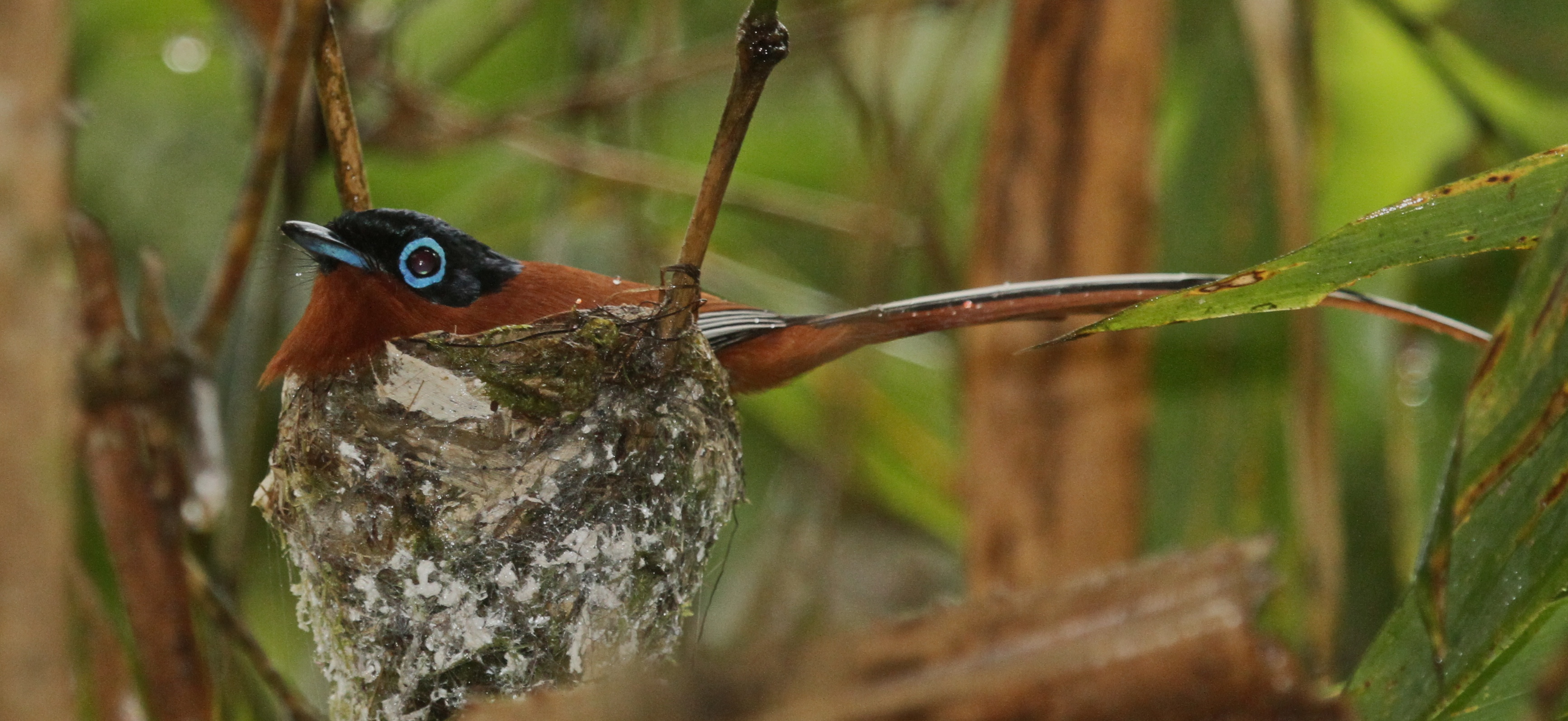
The Malagasy paradise-flycatcher is one of many species of bird found at Marojejy.

Marojejy National Park is best known for its two iconic species, the helmet vanga (Euryceros prevostii) and the critically endangered silky sifaka or simpona (Propithecus candidus). The silky sifaka has been listed as one of "The World's 25 Most Endangered Primates" since the inception of the list in 2000. According to estimates, fewer than 1,000 individuals of this species remain, and none exist in captivity.

The wealth of species of well-known groups of animals demonstrates the depth of the biodiversity found at Marojejy National Park. For example, 75 of the 118 species of birds (64%) found in or around Marojejy are forest-dwelling birds, a total that surpasses any other mountain site in Madagascar. All of these forest-dependent bird species are endemic to Madagascar and utilize the forest for some portion of their life-cycle. One of these birds is the Madagascar serpent-eagle (Eutriorchis astur), which prior to being reported in 1990, had not been seen by ornithologists since 1932.

In addition to the silky sifaka, Marojejy is home to 10 other species of lemur, several of which are also endangered due mainly to habitat loss. The nocturnal aye-aye has only been seen once at the park, although one old nest and traces of its feeding have been found at various elevations. Other mammals include at least 15 species of tenrec, seven species of native rodent, the fossa (Cryptoprocta ferox), and the Madagascar sucker-footed bat (Myzopoda aurita).

The reptile and amphibian diversity at Marojejy is also rich, higher than any other protected area in Madagascar. A total of 148 species have been inventoried, and 17 of these are found only in Marojejy, including Brookesia karchei and Chamaeleo peyrieresi, two species of several chameleons found there. The panther chameleon (Furcifer pardalis), leaf-tailed geckos (genus Uroplatus), and many species of frogs are also reported from this locality. Invertebrates include large millipedes, spiders, and an abundance of small leeches.

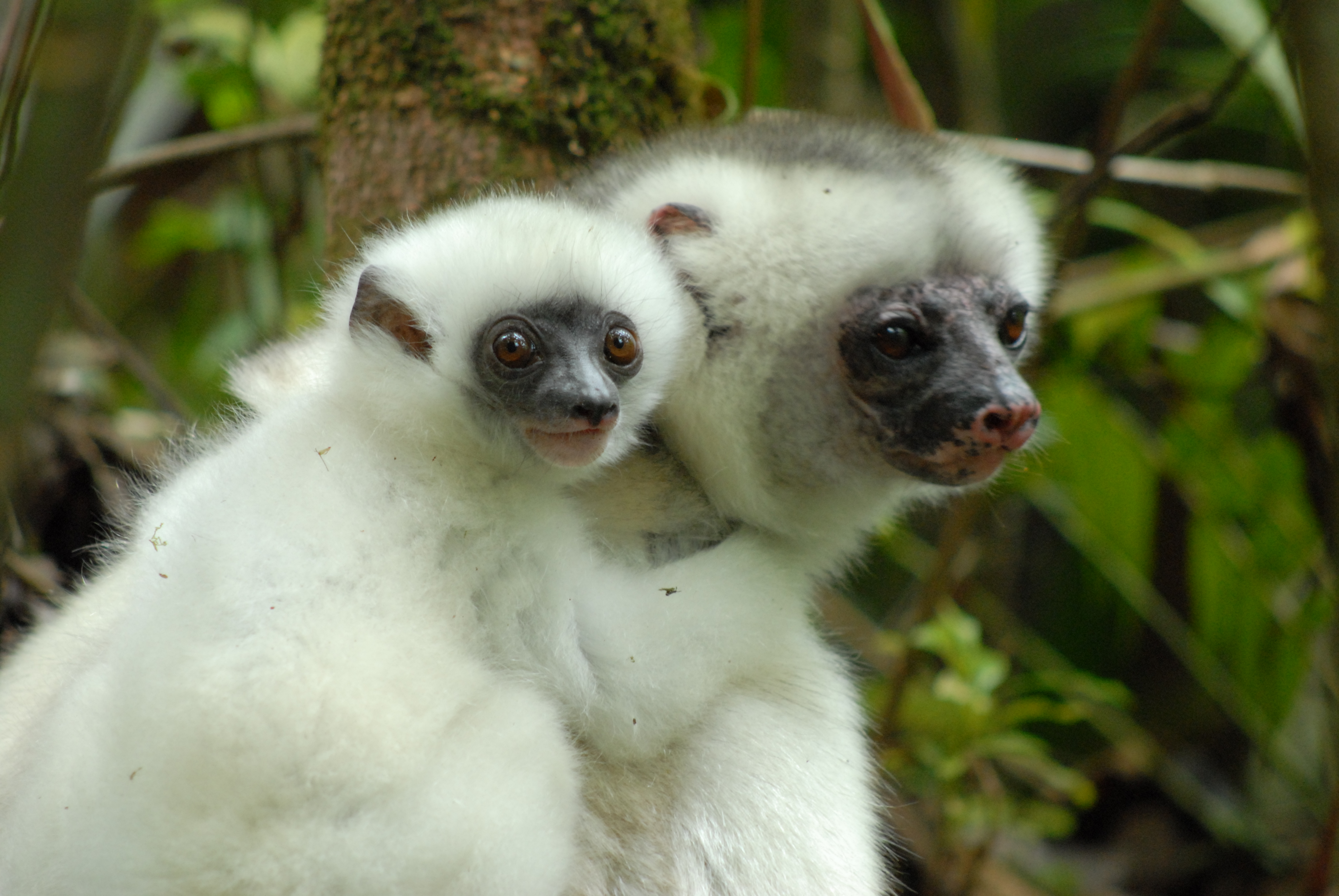
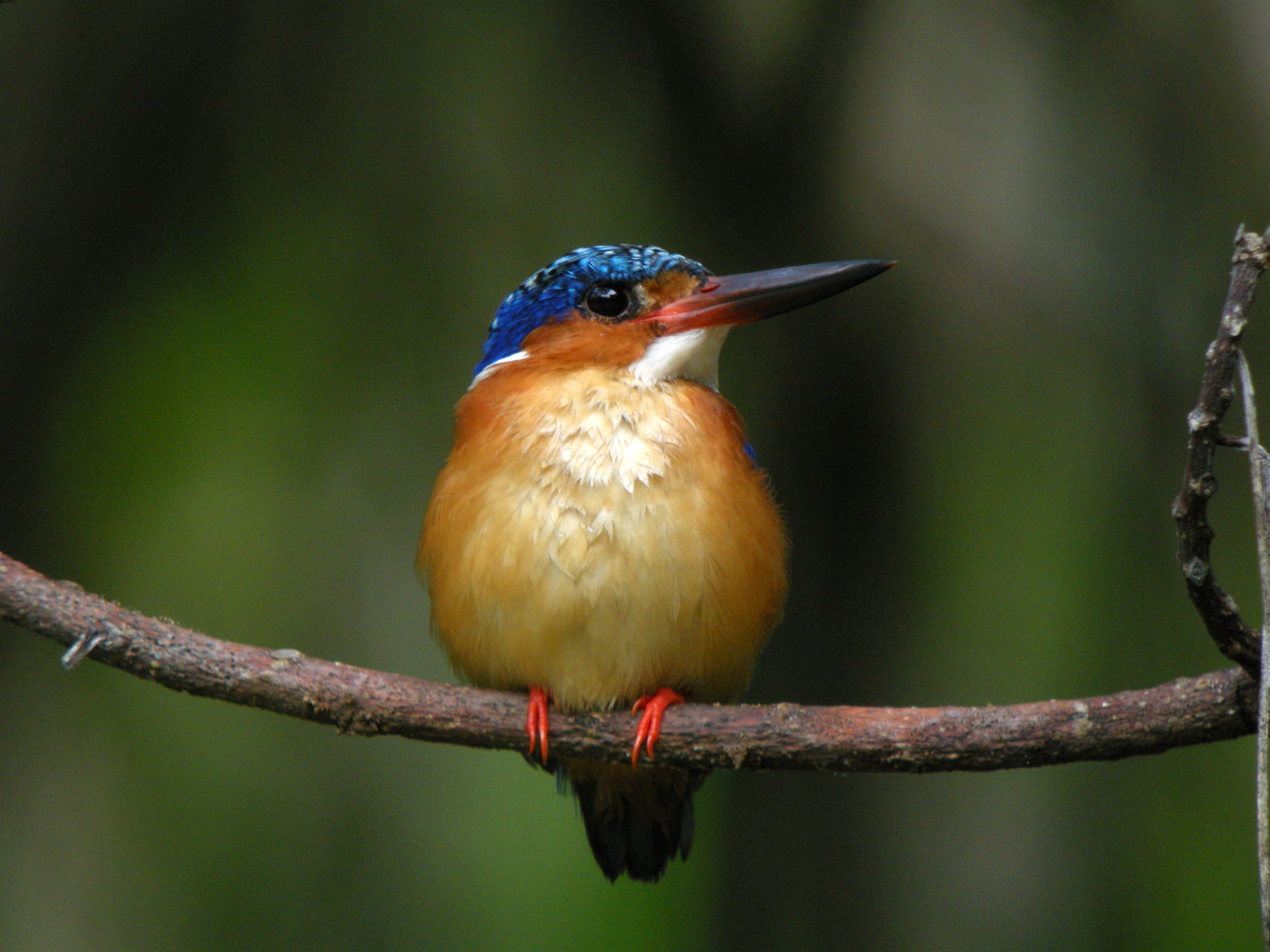
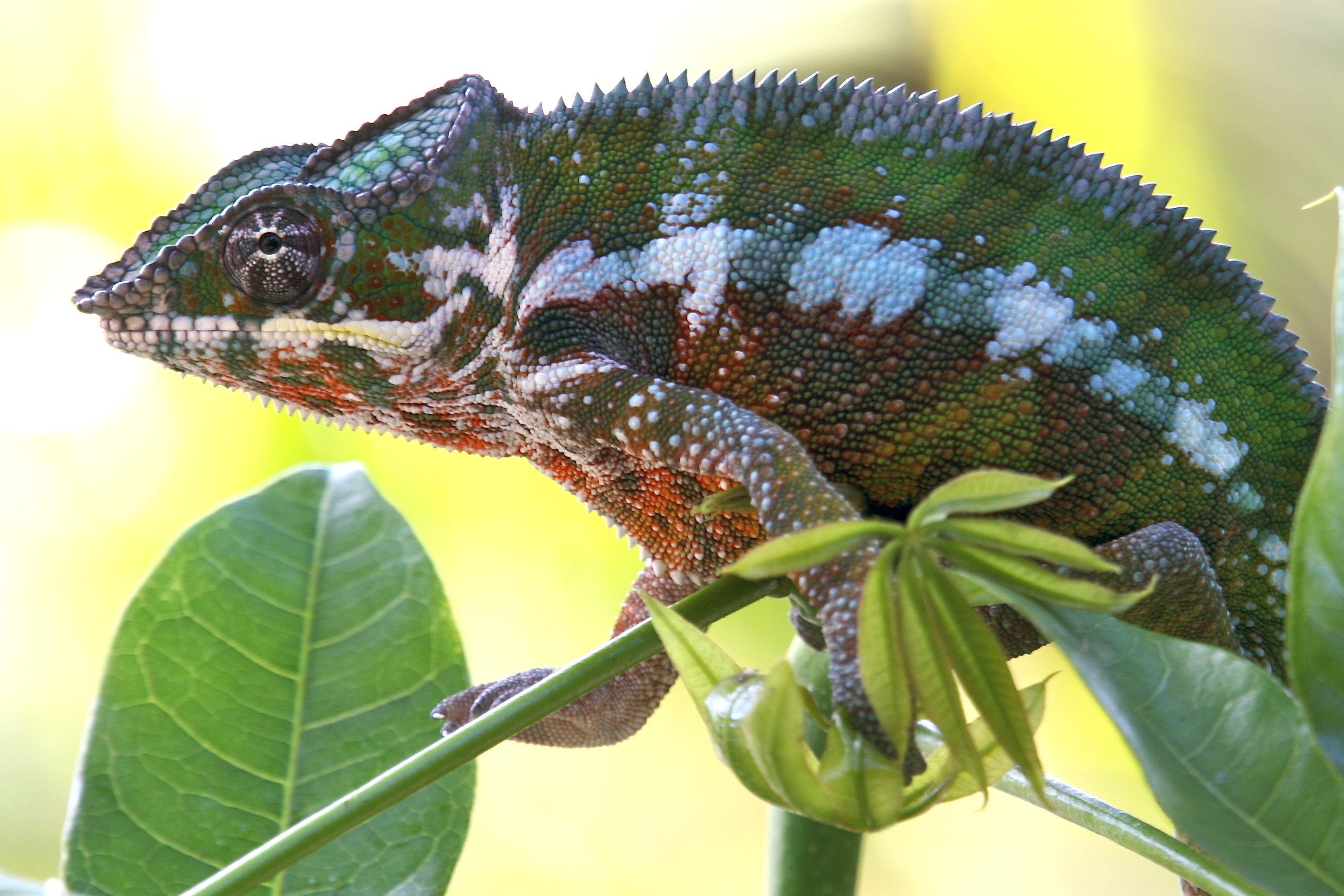
Marojejy National Park is rich in biodiversity and is home to the critically endangered silky sifaka (left), the Malagasy kingfisher (center), and the colorful panther chameleon (right).

== Camps and accommodation ==
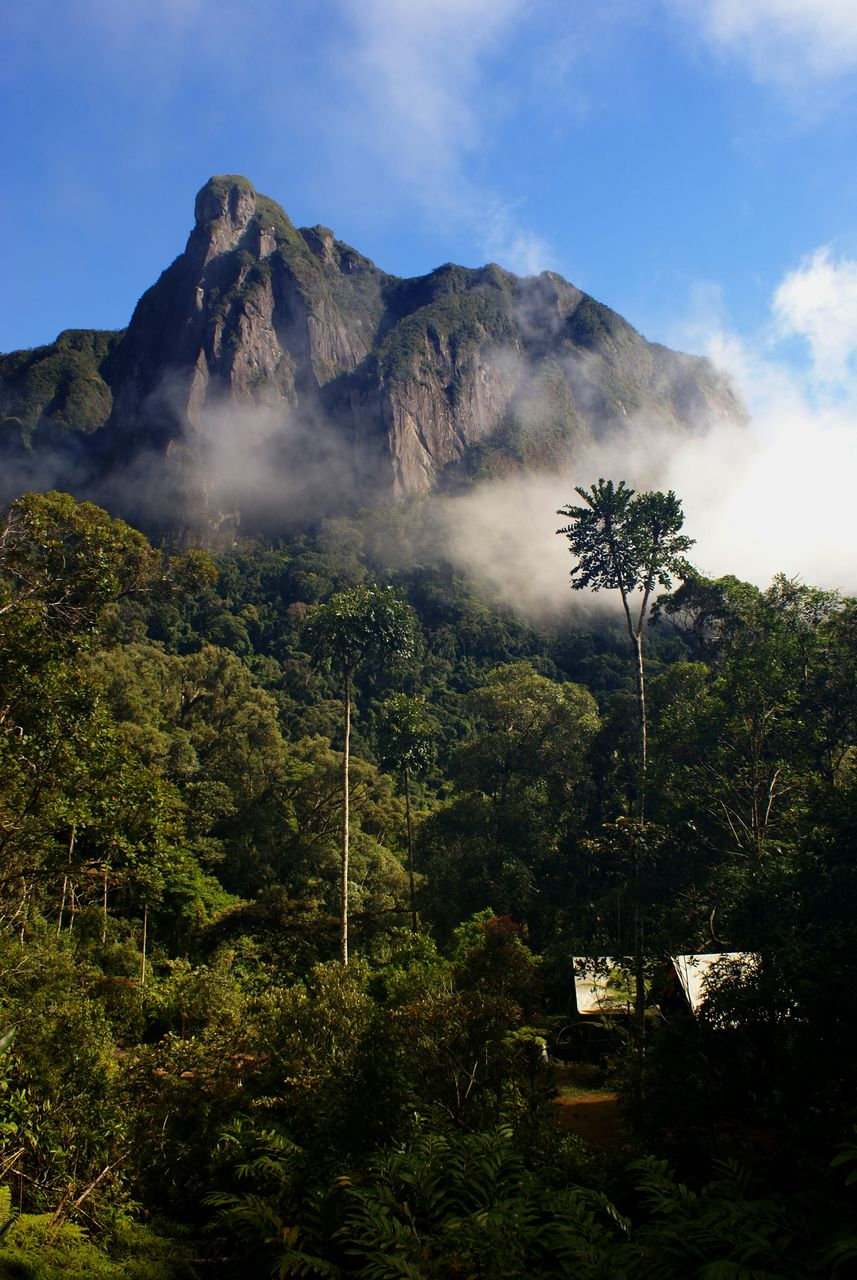
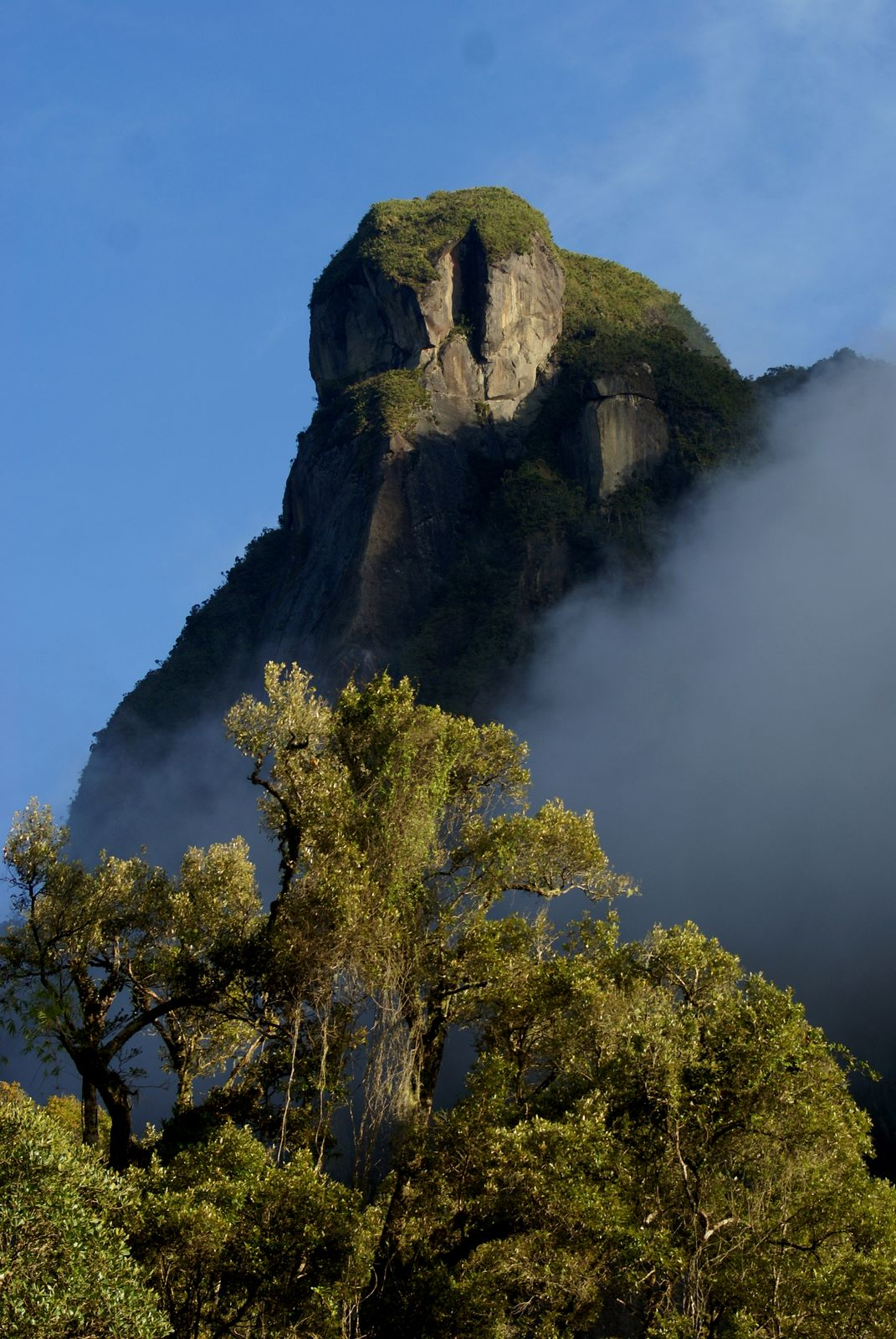
Marojejy has one trail leading to the summit, with three camps, including Camp Marojejia (left), and views of geological features, such as Ambatotsondrona (right), covered in virgin rain forest.

Marojejy National Park is open all year, with Bradt Travel Guides recommending April to May and September to December as the best times to visit due to less rainfall. The park is one of the only national parks in Madagascar offering wooden chalets or bungalows, in addition to having a kitchen and toilet facilities at each of its three main camps inside a primary rainforest. The housing provides beds and basic bedding, while the kitchen and eating areas are covered and offer basic cooking utensils. These three camps have basic tent sites for campers. Tent campsites are also offered outside the park, while the only other overnight accommodations outside the park are in Andapa and Sambava.

The park is unable to accommodate large groups. Because of the rugged terrain and variable temperatures, advanced planning for visiting the park is recommended.

Payment of the entrance fees, renting of the facilities, and hiring of guides, cooks, and porters are handled at either the park headquarters in Andapa or the Park Visitor Center in Manantenina, which is along the main Andapa-Sambava road, 66 km (41 mi) from Sambava and 40 km (25 mi) from Andapa. The park has a single trail that leads from the information center in Manantenina to the highest peak. The path into the rain forest is divided into three treks that vary in length and lead to each of the three main camps, each of which is situated at different altitudes and offer views of their own distinctive flora and fauna.

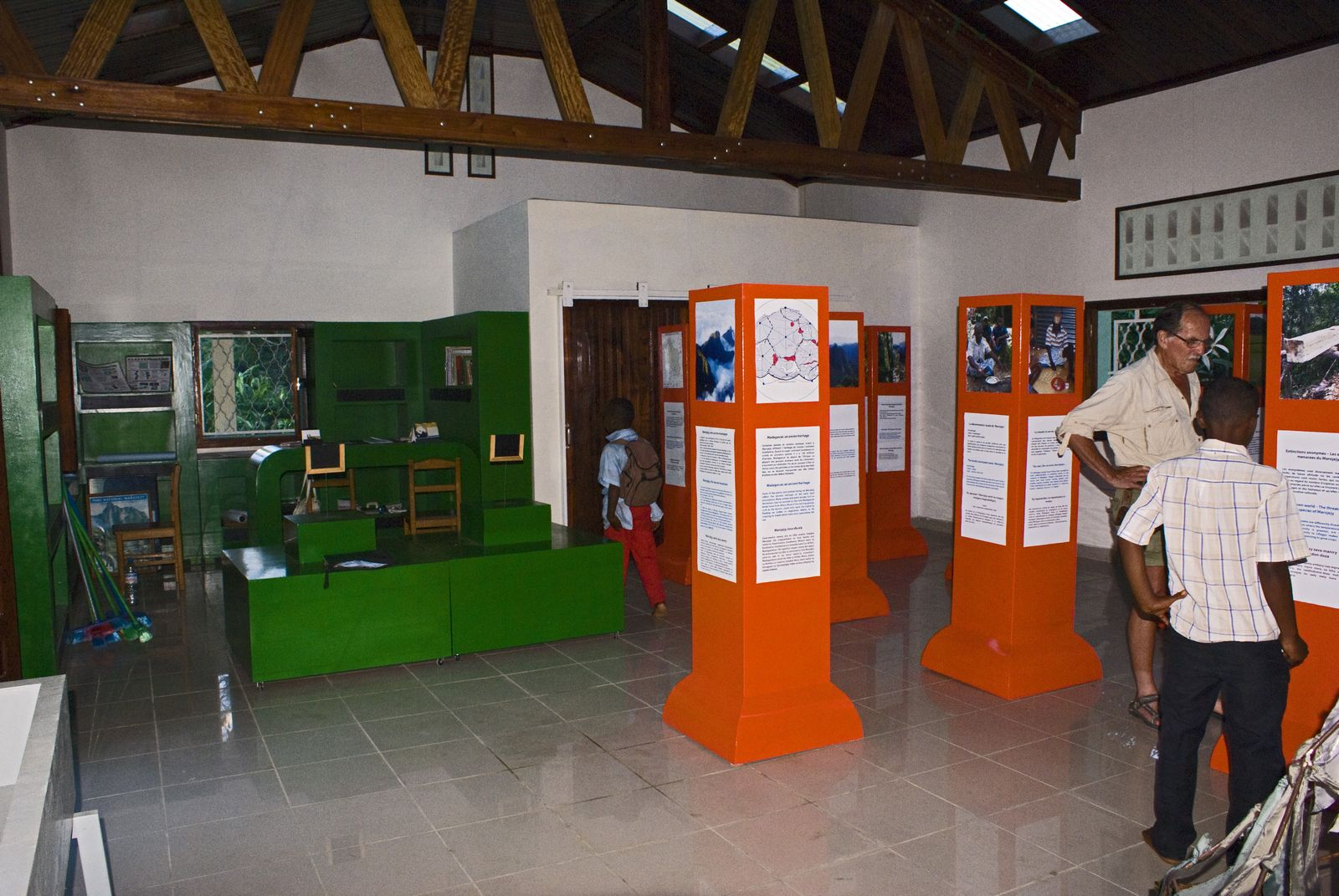
Marojejy National Park's visitor center is located in Manantenina.

The first section of the path, known as the Mantella Trek, takes visitors just inside the park entrance, and leads to a picnic area after the first 2.5 km (1.6 mi). The first camp, Camp Mantella, is 4.5 km (2.8 mi) further along the path. The camp is in the lowland rain forest above the Manantenina River at an elevation of 450 m (1,480 ft). The camp is 800 m (2,600 ft) from the Humbert waterfalls, and offers opportunities to see lemurs, such as the northern bamboo lemur (Hapalemur occidentalis); many species of bird, such as the helmet vanga; as well as a variety of amphibians and reptiles, such as leaf-tailed geckos, leaf chameleons (genus Brookesia), and many types of frogs.

The next 2 km (1.2 mi) along the path is known as the Simpona Trek; the name comes from the Malagasy name for the silky sifaka, which is found in the area. The trail leads to Camp Marojejia, located at an elevation of 775 m (2,543 ft) at the transition between lowland and montane rain forest. The camp sits on a mountainside, and its dining area overlooks a forested outcrop of rock, which includes the peak named Ambatotsondrona, or "Leaning Rock". This camp is reported to be the best location for spotting the silky sifaka, although the staff recommend that visitors hire a specialist tracker to aid in the search.

The Marojejy Summit Trek continues up the mountain for another 2 km (1.2 mi) to Camp Simpona, which is in the middle of the moist montane forest at an elevation of 1,250 m (4,100 ft). There is a ridge with a viewing platform built on it near the camp. Despite the stunted height of the trees in this high-altitude region, silky sifakas can occasionally be spotted from the bungalows. The rufous-headed ground-roller (Atelornis crossleyi) and yellow-bellied sunbird-asity (Neodrepanis hypoxantha) can be seen here, and a nearby stream teems with a diverse collection of frog species. Camp Simpona also serves as a basecamp for the steep climb to the summit of Marojejy Massif, one of Madagascar's highest but most accessible peaks. The climb to the peak stretches 2 km (1.2 mi) and takes four to five hours.

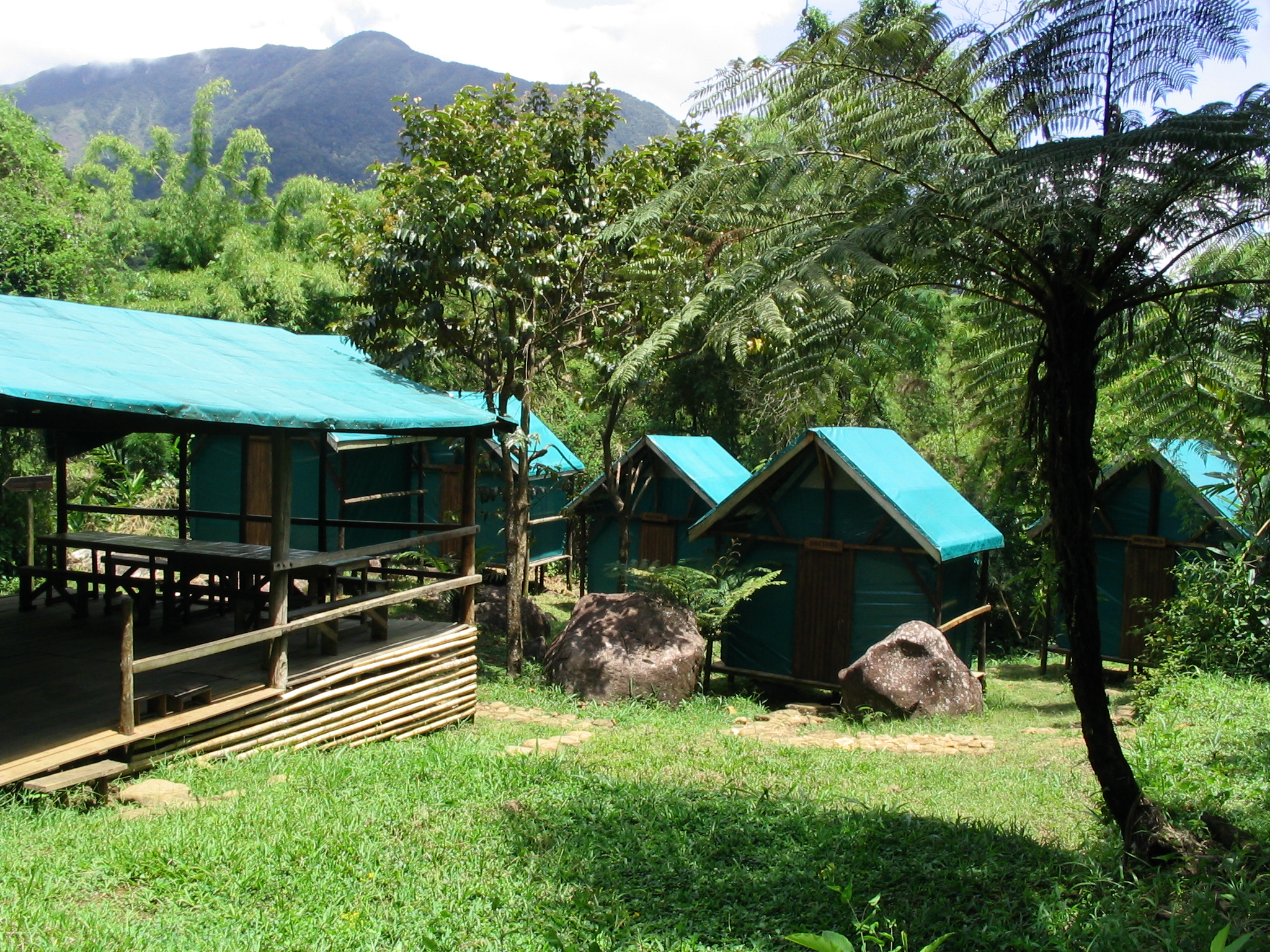
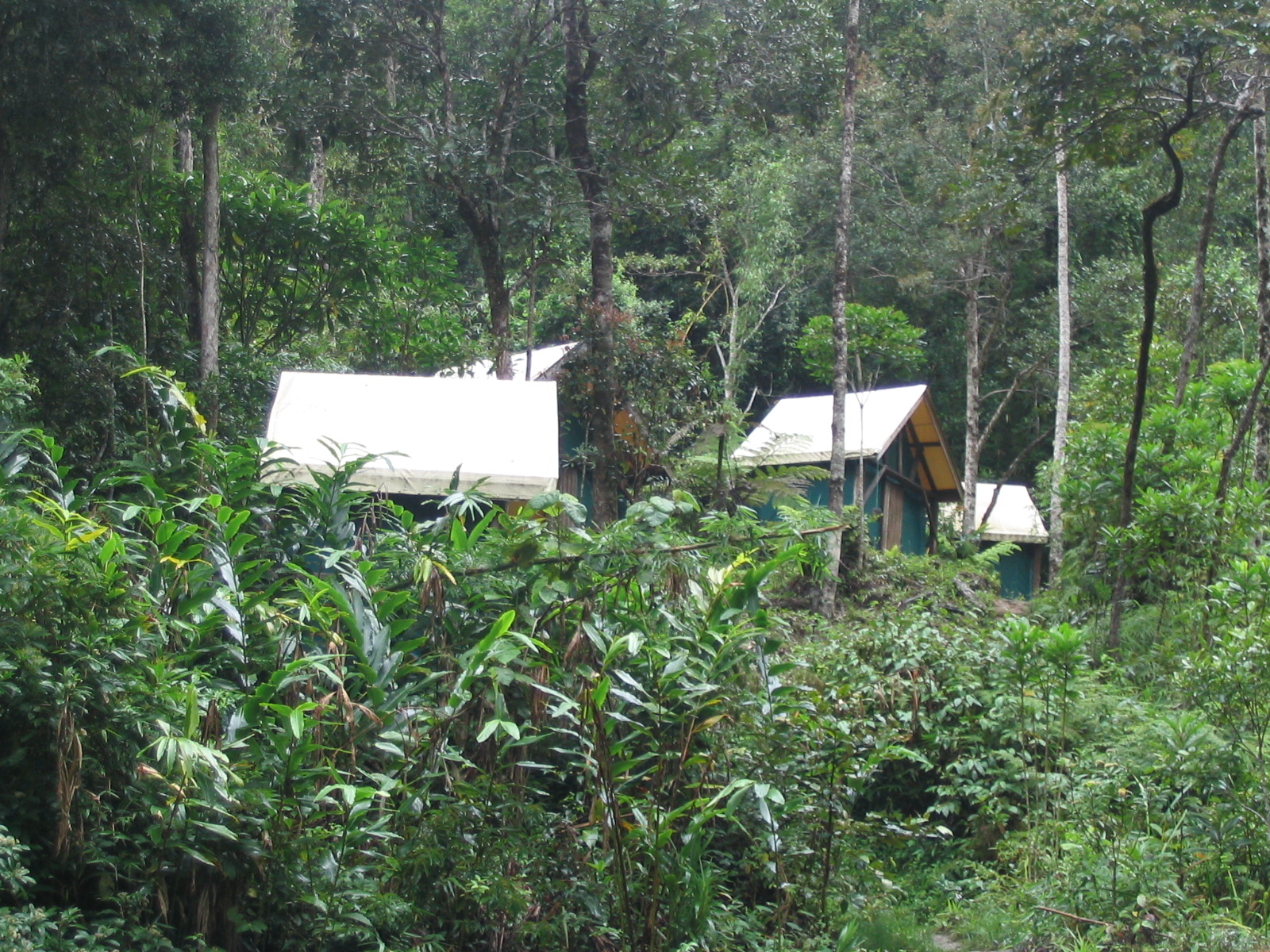
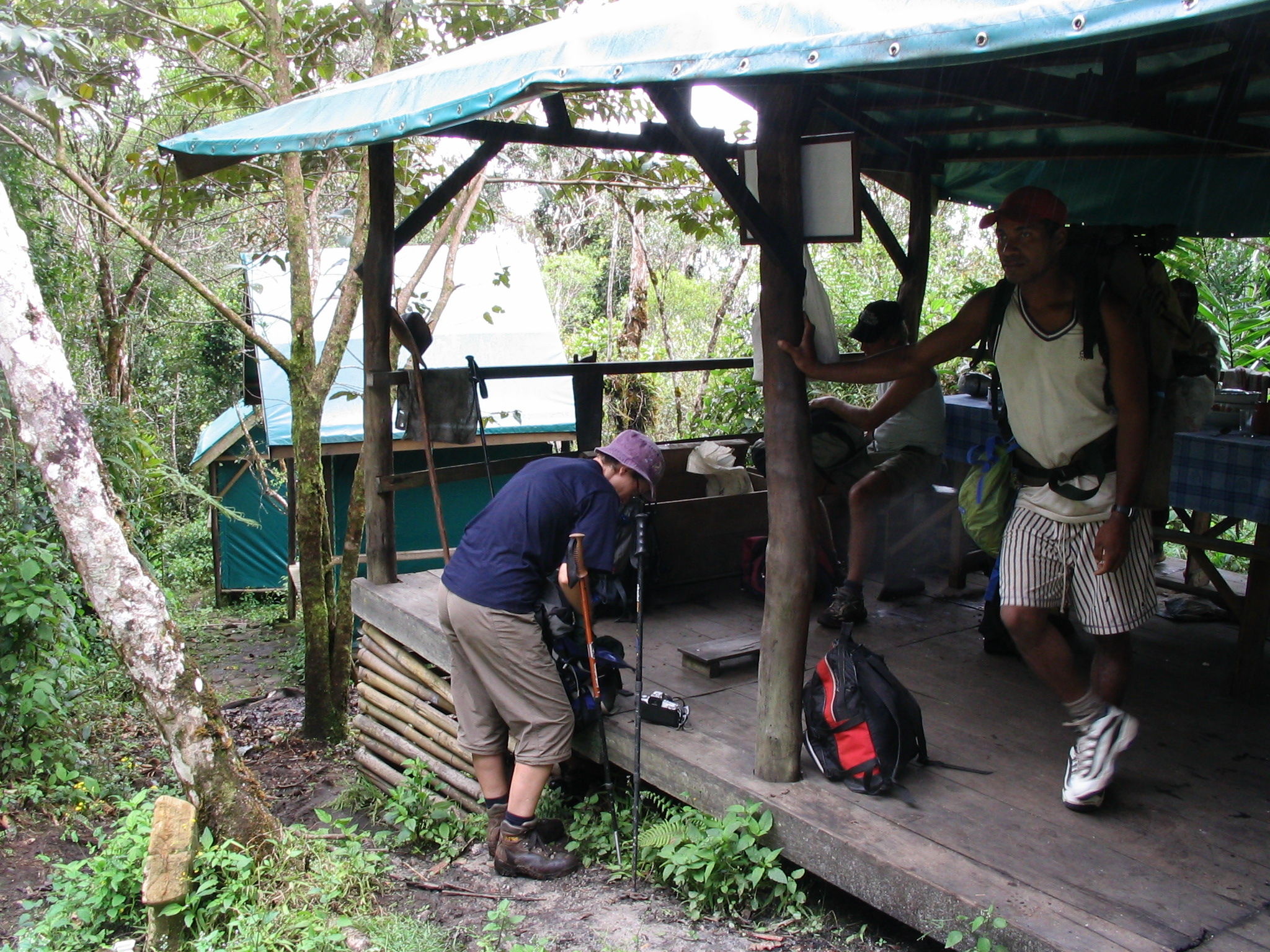
The trail to the summit at Marojejy National Park stops at three camps along the way, Camp Mantella (left), Camp Marojejia (center), and Camp Simpona (right).

== Local people ==
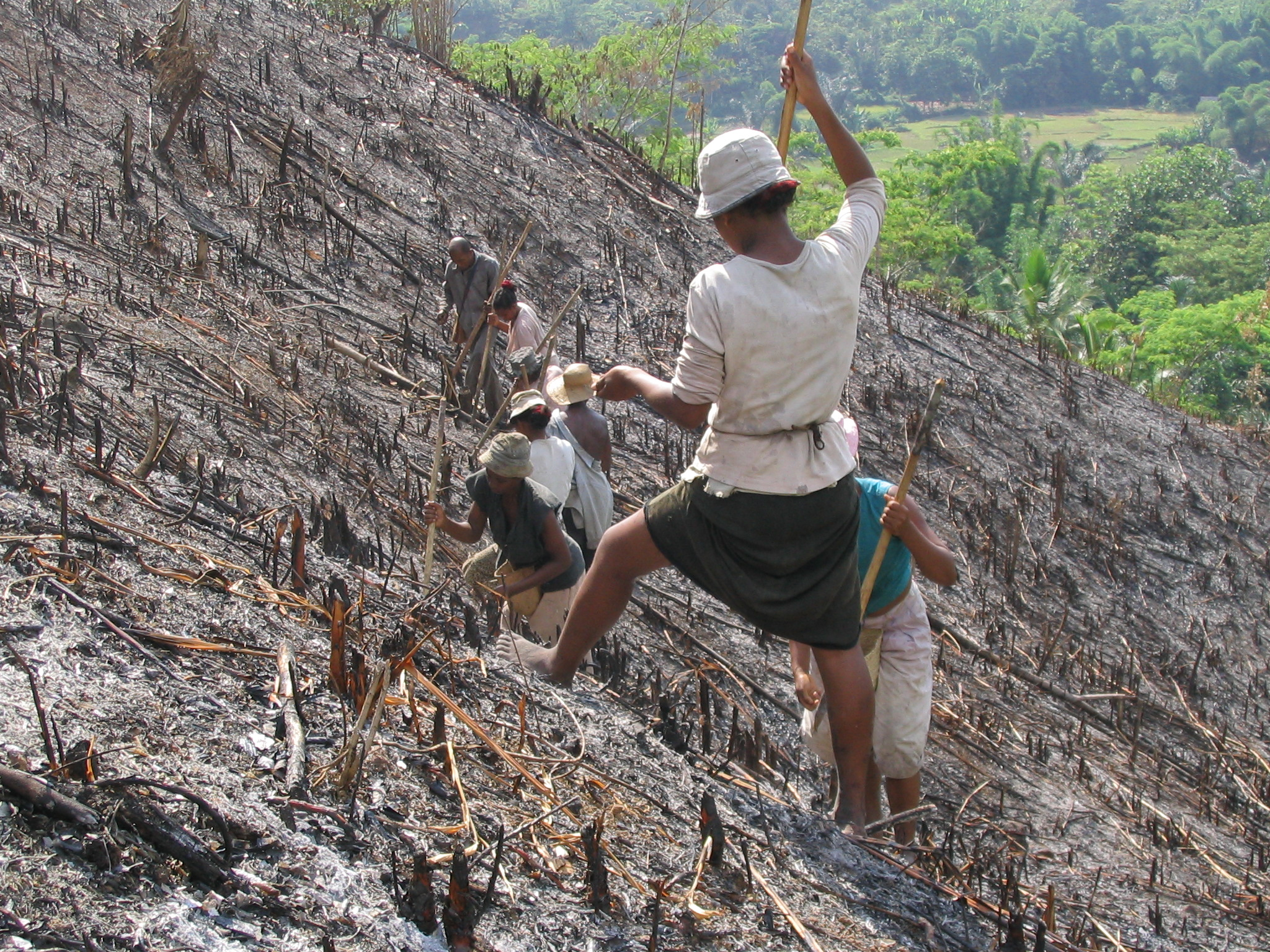
Most people in the area surrounding Marojejy National Park are subsistence farmers. Many burn hillsides to plant rice (slash and burn agriculture).

The Andapa Basin, surrounded by the high, rugged mountains of Marojejy and Anjanaharibe-Sud, was extremely remote and difficult to access until relatively recently. As a consequence, the area was not permanently settled until the mid-1800s, when refugees fled the Merina Kingdom. Nearly half a century later, another wave of refugees settled in the area, this time fleeing from French colonists. The population in the region, however, remained relatively small, despite a last small wave of immigration following World War I when people from Réunion came to the region to grow vanilla. The population did not increase noticeably until the early 1970s when construction of the Andapa–Sambava road was completed, connecting the region to the coast. This improved transportation route encouraged agricultural development and spawned another wave of immigration. Over the next 30 years, it was estimated that the population tripled, with more than 100,000 people living in the region by 2003. With 37 villages surrounding Marojejy, the population density is one of the highest in Madagascar and it continues to grow. The dominant ethnic groups in the region are the Tsimihety (the first settlers) and the Betsimisaraka, although other groups from the southern part of the island have also established themselves.

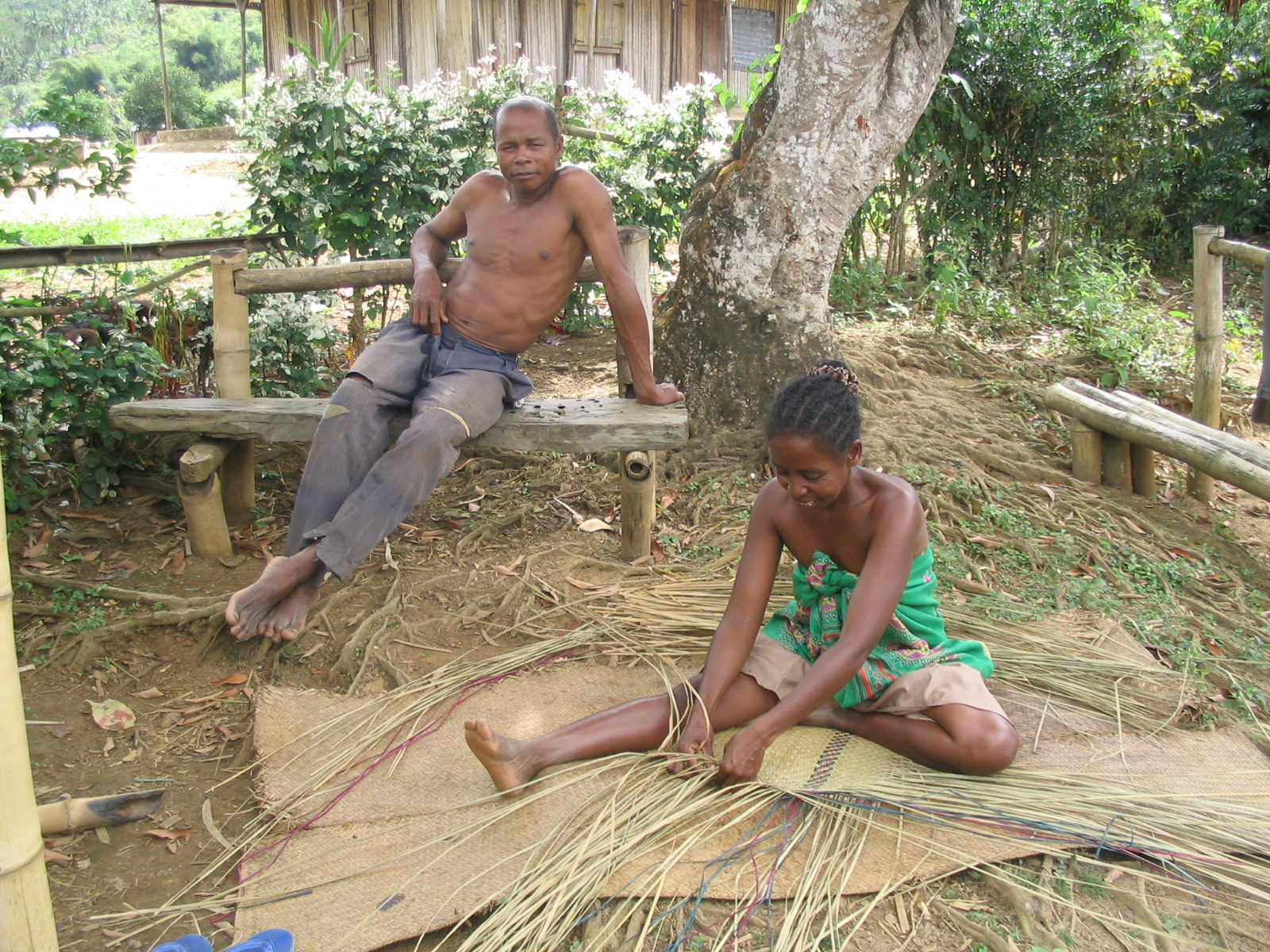
Fiber for weaving, like many other materials utilized in the traditional lifestyles of the people of the region, is obtained from the forests.

The local people have traditionally utilized material from the forest, whether for use in their architecture, to make pirogues (dugout canoes), to provide fiber for weaving, to provide firewood, to gather leaves for traditional medicine, or to flavor their drinks. Most of the residents are subsistence rice farmers who cultivate irrigated paddies in valleys or who plant on hillsides that have been cleared and burned (slash and burn agriculture, known locally as tavy). The swamps which formerly covered vast areas of Andapa Basin have been converted to rice paddies which are intensively cultivated; however the Tsimihety traditionally practice slash and burn techniques on the hillsides in preference to irrigated rice fields. Coffee was an important cash crop before market prices fell in the 1970s, but vanilla remains an important crop for the area. Until the mid-2000s, vanilla prices were high, but they have since fallen off significantly. The crash of vanilla prices, along with a rapidly growing population and steady decrease in cultivatable land, has resulted in widespread and extreme poverty. Between January and April, before the main rice harvest, many people in the region do not receive enough food to eat. The Sava Region, which includes Marojejy, is the poorest region in Madagascar, and in 2011, continued rises in global food prices—particularly that of imported rice—has made obtaining food more difficult for rural families.

Not only have international environmental organizations (such as Conservation International, Wildlife Conservation Society, World Wide Fund for Nature, and Care International) established programs to help local residents, many local people work to improve their situation through environmental and health education programs. An increase in sustainable agriculture, silviculture, conservation awareness, and improved education and health care have also furthered the goal of protecting the environment and promoting livelihoods centered on the remaining forest. Limited and responsible ecotourism is also seen as a long-term alternative to continued deforestation.

== Conservation concerns ==
The protections normally afforded to national parks have not halted the degradations of Marojejy National Park. The hunting of lemurs, including the silky sifaka, is a persistent problem, as is the harvesting of precious hardwoods, such as rosewood and palissandre. Semi-precious gemstones, such as amethyst, are still mined within the boundaries of the park, while slash and burn agriculture and wood collection for firewood and construction continue to cause the periphery to recede. These pressures are growing strong as the population in the region continues to increase. In 2003, approximately 200,000 people lived within 40 km (25 mi) of the park, 80% of whom were farmers that were still dependent upon the forest for agricultural land and various products, such as honey, firewood, and plant fibers, as well as tree bark from plants of the family Rutaceae (primarily genus Evodia) used to ferment betsabetsa, a local sugarcane spirit. Additionally, inappropriate use of the park or excessive visitation by guests could also pose a threat to the fragile high-altitude scrub.

=== Illegal logging ===
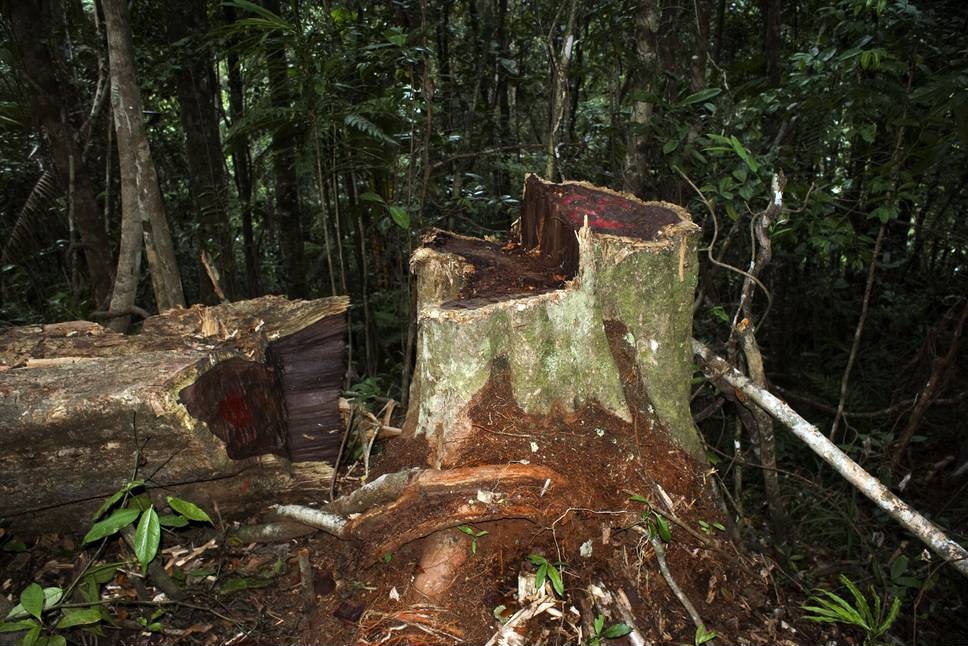
Rosewood is illegally logged from Marojejy National Park.

Madagascar's northeastern rain forests are severely threatened by illegal logging of precious hardwood, which not only dries out the forest (making it susceptible to fire), introduces invasive species, degrades habitat, and reduces genetic diversity, but also violates local taboos and traditions. Additional species, such as species of Dombeya, are typically cut to make rafts for floating the heavier hardwoods down rivers and out of the parks. Rosewood trees are cut into multiple logs for easier transport, and five or more high-buoyancy trees are cut per hardwood log. To tie the rafts together, the loggers cut thousands of lianas or vines, which are used by 75% of the forest fauna as avenues for moving around in the canopy. The logging activities are labor-intensive and dangerous. The labor employs the impoverished local population, but the officials who facilitate the process primarily benefit.

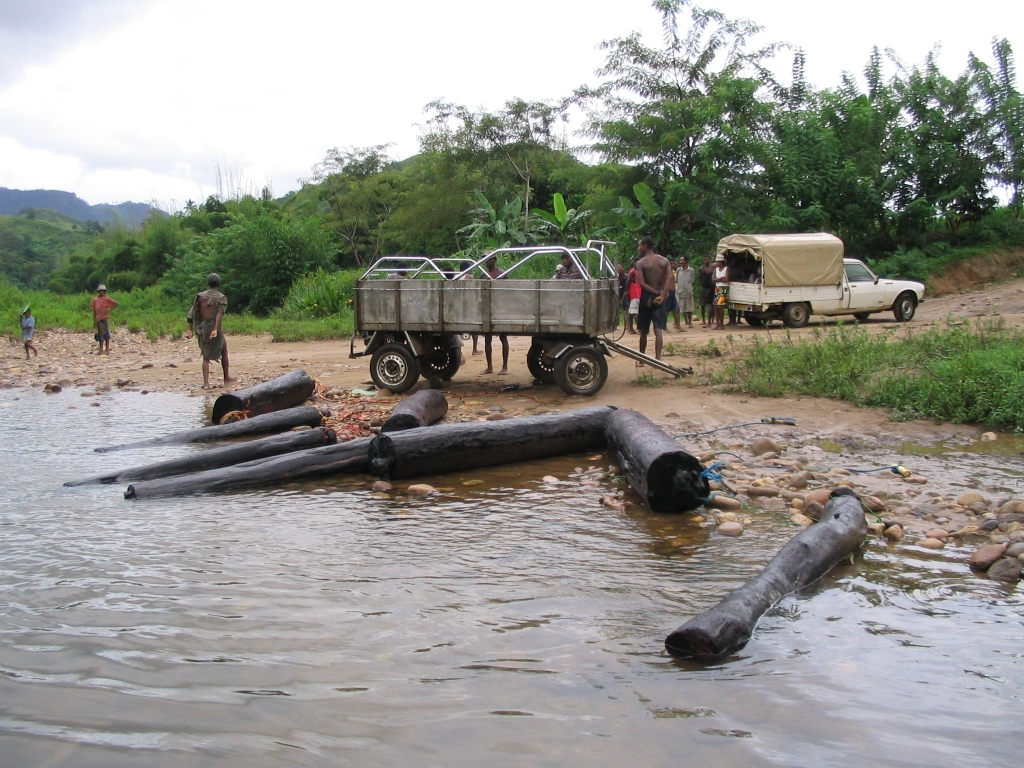
Rosewood leaves the park by being floated downstream to waiting trucks.

In 2005, illegal logging of rosewood was reported to have occurred more than 20 times. In 2007 at the port cities of Vohémar, Antalaha, and Toamasina, authorities confiscated thousands of logs valued at millions of dollars (US$). Some of this material was reportedly logged from eastern and northeastern parts of the park. At the start of the Malagasy political crisis in March 2009, thousands of woodcutters intensely logged precious hardwoods for six to eight weeks in the SAVA Region. An estimated 52,000 tons of rosewood lumber, or nearly 100,000 trees, were logged that year, with one-third of the total coming from Marojejy National Park and the remainder from nearby Masoala National Park. As a result, the park was closed briefly, but reopened in May 2009. In 2010, the situation improved in Marojejy, but illegal logging intensified in Masoala and the Makira Protected Area.

Illegal logging has been facilitated by insufficient governance, unclear forest regulation, and undermined judicial control while the exportation of the acquired logs (in 1992, 2006, and 2009–2010) has been permitted by government decrees that either precede elections or are issued during periods of political instability. The trade is organized and operated by high-ranking officials and influential businessmen. Additionally, the trade in Malagasy rosewood is not regulated under the Convention on International Trade in Endangered Species (CITES).
