= Humbert Falls =

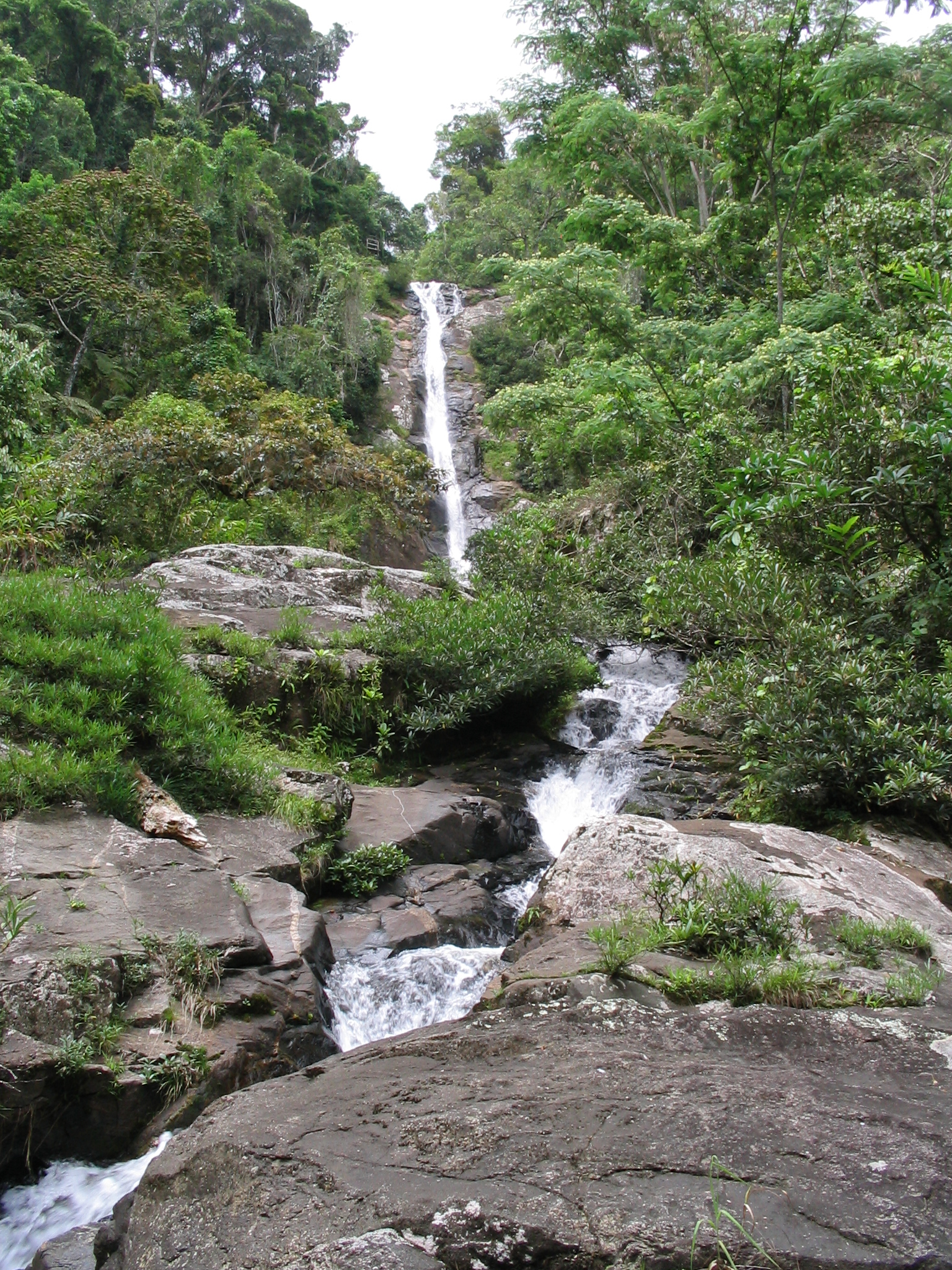
- Humbert Falls

- Location within Madagascar
- Location: Andapa, Sambava, Sava, Madagascar
- Coordinates: 14°25′00″S 49°45′00″E
- Total height: 40 m (130 ft)
- Number of drops: 2

The Humbert Falls is a waterfall in the Marojejy National Park in North-Eastern Madagascar. It is situated approximately 800m from Camp Mantella and 4.3 km from the entrance of the park.
