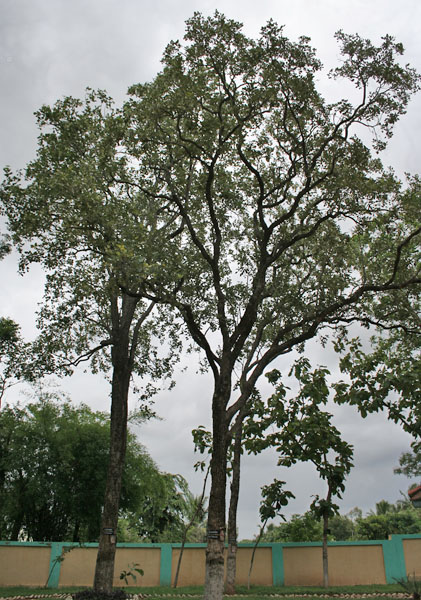
- In Talakona forest, in Tirupati district of Andhra Pradesh, India

Conservation status
- Endangered (IUCN 3.1)

Scientific classification
- Kingdom: Plantae
- Clade: Tracheophytes
- Clade: Angiosperms
- Clade: Eudicots
- Clade: Rosids
- Order: Fabales
- Family: Fabaceae
- Subfamily: Faboideae
- Genus: Pterocarpus
- Species: P. santalinus

Binomial name
- Pterocarpus santalinus L.f.

Synonyms
- Lingoum santalinum (L.f.) Kuntze

= Pterocarpus santalinus =

Species of legume

Pterocarpus santalinus, with the common names red sanders, red saunders, Yerra Chandanam, Chenchandanam, red sandalwood, Rakta Chandana, and rakto chandon, is a species of Pterocarpus endemic to the southern Eastern Ghats mountain range of South India. It is known for its red colour and has been used for furniture, musical instruments, and traditional herbal medicine. Because of the high market value for its timber, the species has been overexploited, and illegal trade remains a problem. It is listed as endangered on the IUCN Red List. It should not be confused with the aromatic Santalum sandalwood trees native to southern India.

== Description ==
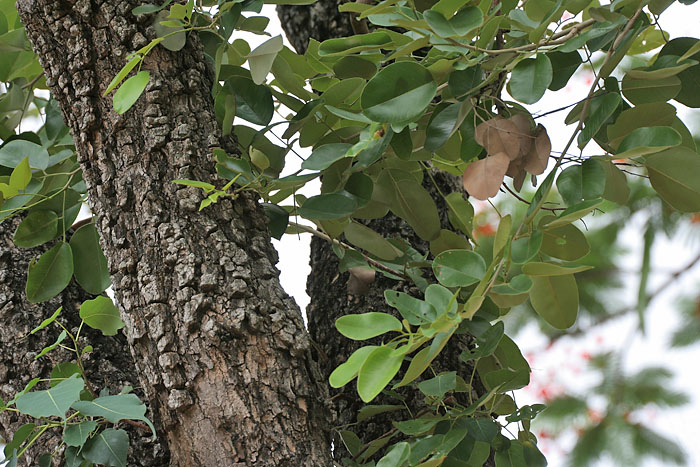
In Talakona forest, in Tirupati district of Andhra Pradesh, India

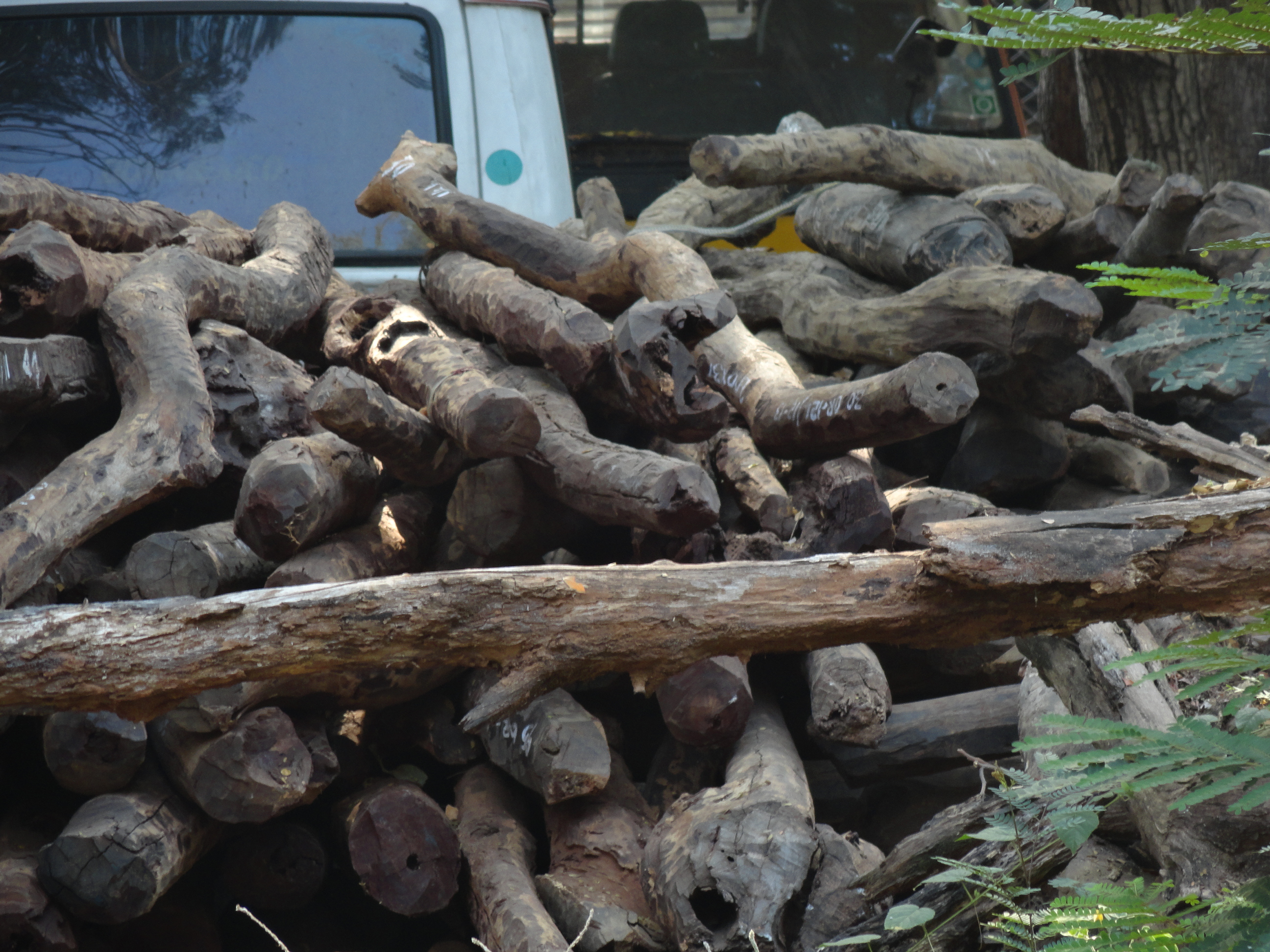
Seized red sandalwood logs at Forest office, Tirupati

Pterocarpus santalinus is a light-demanding small tree, growing to 8 metres (26 ft) tall with a trunk 50–150 cm (20–59 in) diameter. It is fast-growing when young, reaching 5 metres (16 ft) tall in three years, even on degraded soils. It is not frost tolerant, being killed by temperatures of −1 °C (30 °F).

The leaves are alternate, 3–9 cm (1.2–3.5 in) long, trifoliate with three leaflets.

The flowers are produced in short racemes. The fruit is a pod 6–9 cm (2.4–3.5 in) long containing one or two seeds.

== Uses ==
=== Timber ===
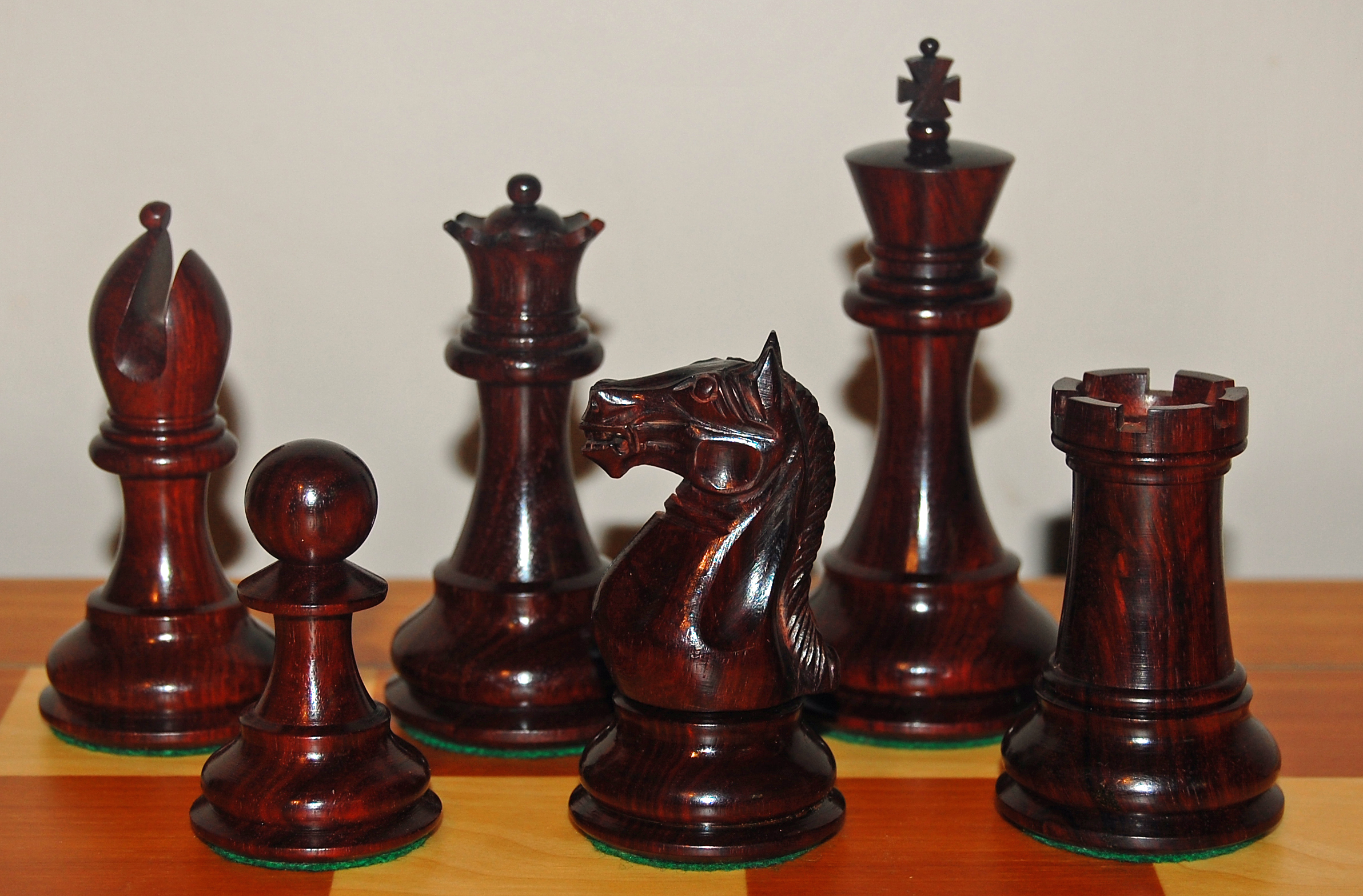
Chess pieces in red sandalwood

The wood has historically been valued in China, particularly during the Qing dynasty periods, and is referred to in Chinese as zitan (紫檀) and spelt tzu-t'an by earlier western authors such as Gustav Ecke, who introduced classical Chinese hardwood furniture to the west. An exquisite chair made of red sandalwood can be seen today in China's Forbidden City in Beijing, inside the Hall of Supreme Harmony, and once used by the emperors of the Qing dynasty.

Due to its slow growth and rarity, furniture made from zitan is difficult to find and can be expensive. It has been one of the most prized woods for millennia.

In India red sandalwood is one main and lucrative market for smugglers, as a high price is paid for this wood in China. Since the exporting of sandalwood is illegal in India, the underground market is growing and there are a number of arrests every year of those trying to smuggle this wood to China.

The other form of zitan is from the species Dalbergia louvelii, Dalbergia maritima, and Dalbergia normandii, all similar species named in trade as bois de rose or violet rosewood which when cut are bright crimson purple changing to dark purple again. It has a fragrant scent when worked.

=== Shamisen ===
Red sandalwood has been used for making the bridge and also the neck of the Japanese musical instrument shamisen. The heartwood is preferred for this purpose.

=== Medicinal values ===
Pterocarpus santalinus is used in traditional herbal medicine as an antipyretic, anti-inflammatory, anthelmintic, tonic, hemorrhage, dysentery, aphrodisiac, anti-hyperglycaemic and diaphoretic.

=== Grading of red sandalwood ===
Red sandalwood grown on the shale subsoils, at altitudes around 750 metres (2,460 ft), and in semi-arid climatic conditions gives a distinctive wavy grain margin. Lumber pieces with the wavy grain margin are graded as "A" grade. Red sandalwood with wavy grain margins sells at higher prices than the standard wood.

== Conservation status ==
Pterocarpus santalinus was listed as an Endangered species by the IUCN, because of overexploitation for its timber in South India; however, it was later reclassified to Near Threatened in 2018, as the scale of this loss is not properly known. It is also listed in the appendix II of the CITES, which means that a certificate is required in order to export it, that should only be granted if the trade is not detrimental to the survival of the species.

== Gallery ==
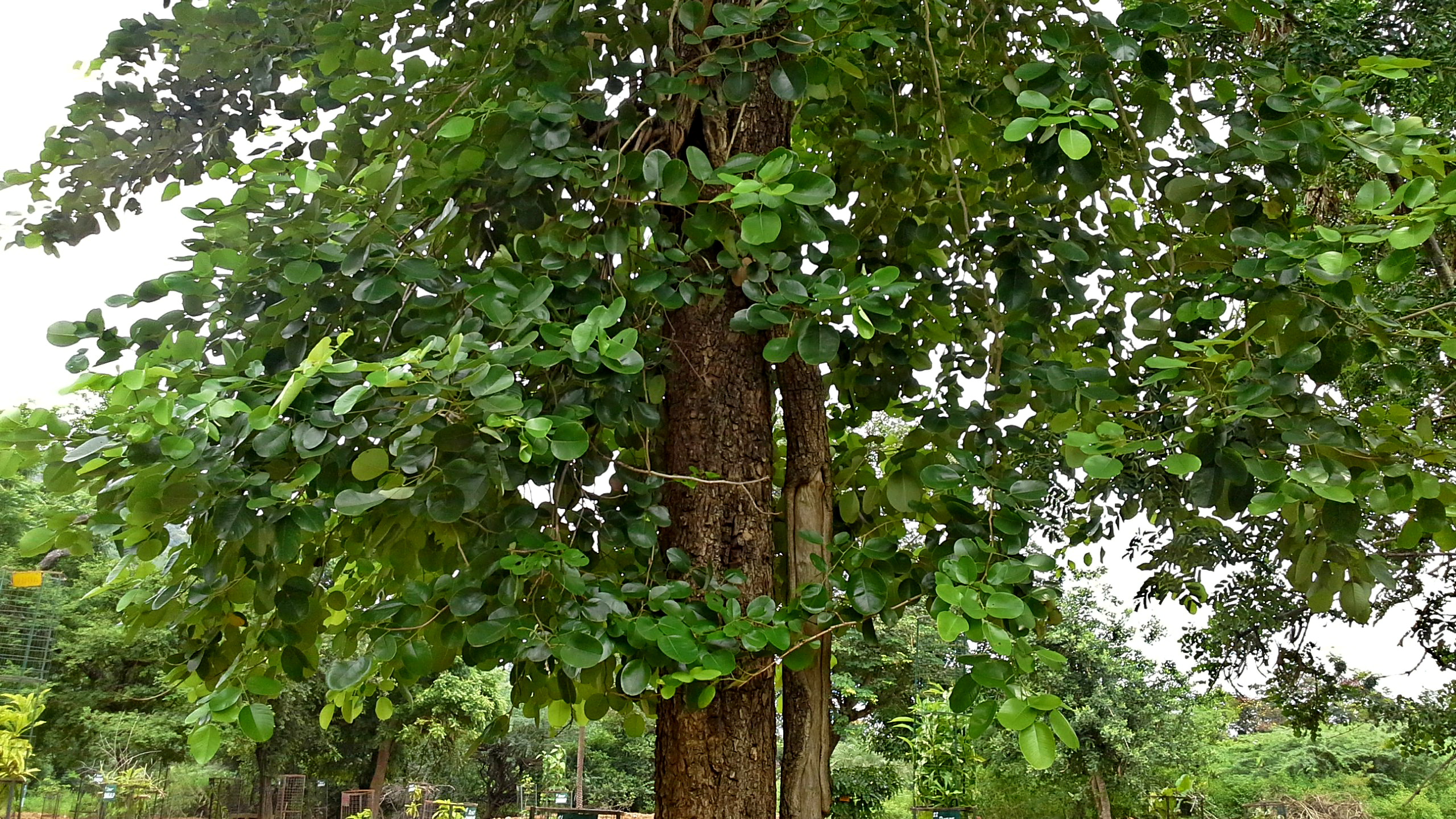
Pterocarpus santalinus (red sandal) in north coastal Andhra Pradesh

== See also ==
- Adenanthera pavonina
- Algum
- Pushpa: The Rise (Note: The films related to illegal business of red sandalwood)
- Pushpa 2: The Rule
