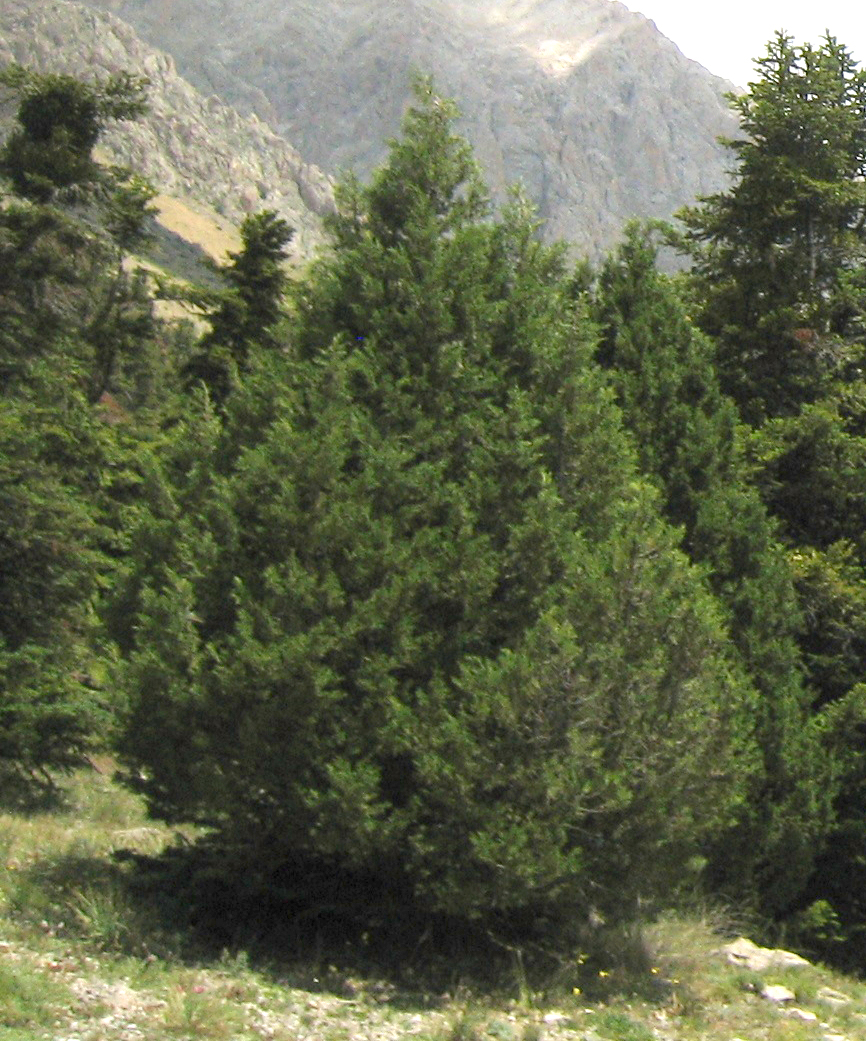

Conservation status
- Least Concern (IUCN 3.1)

Scientific classification
- Kingdom: Plantae
- Clade: Tracheophytes
- Clade: Gymnospermae
- Division: Pinophyta
- Class: Pinopsida
- Order: Cupressales
- Family: Cupressaceae
- Genus: Juniperus
- Section: Juniperus sect. Sabina
- Species: J. foetidissima

Binomial name
- Juniperus foetidissima Willd.
- Natural range

= Juniperus foetidissima =

Species of juniper tree

Juniperus foetidissima, with common names foetid juniper or stinking juniper, is a juniper tree species in the family Cupressaceae.

== Description ==
Juniperus foetidissima is a medium-sized tree reaching 6–25 metres (20–82 feet) tall, with a trunk up to 2.5 m (8 ft) in diameter. It has a broadly conical to rounded or irregular crown.

The leaves are of two forms, juvenile needle-like leaves 8–10 millimetres (5/16–3/8 in) long on seedlings and re-growth after branch damage, and adult scale-leaves 2–3 mm long on older plants. It is largely dioecious with separate male and female plants, but some individual plants are monoecious, producing both sexes.

The cones are berry-like, 7–13 mm in diameter, blue-black with a whitish waxy bloom, and contain 1–2 (rarely 3) seeds; they are mature in about 18 months. The male cones are 2–3.5 mm long, and shed their pollen in early spring.

It often occurs together with Juniperus excelsa, being distinguished from it by its thicker shoots, 1.2–2 mm in diameter (while J. excelsa's are 0.7–1.3 mm), and green, rather than grey-green, leaves. The crushed foliage has a strong foetid smell, from which the species gets its name.

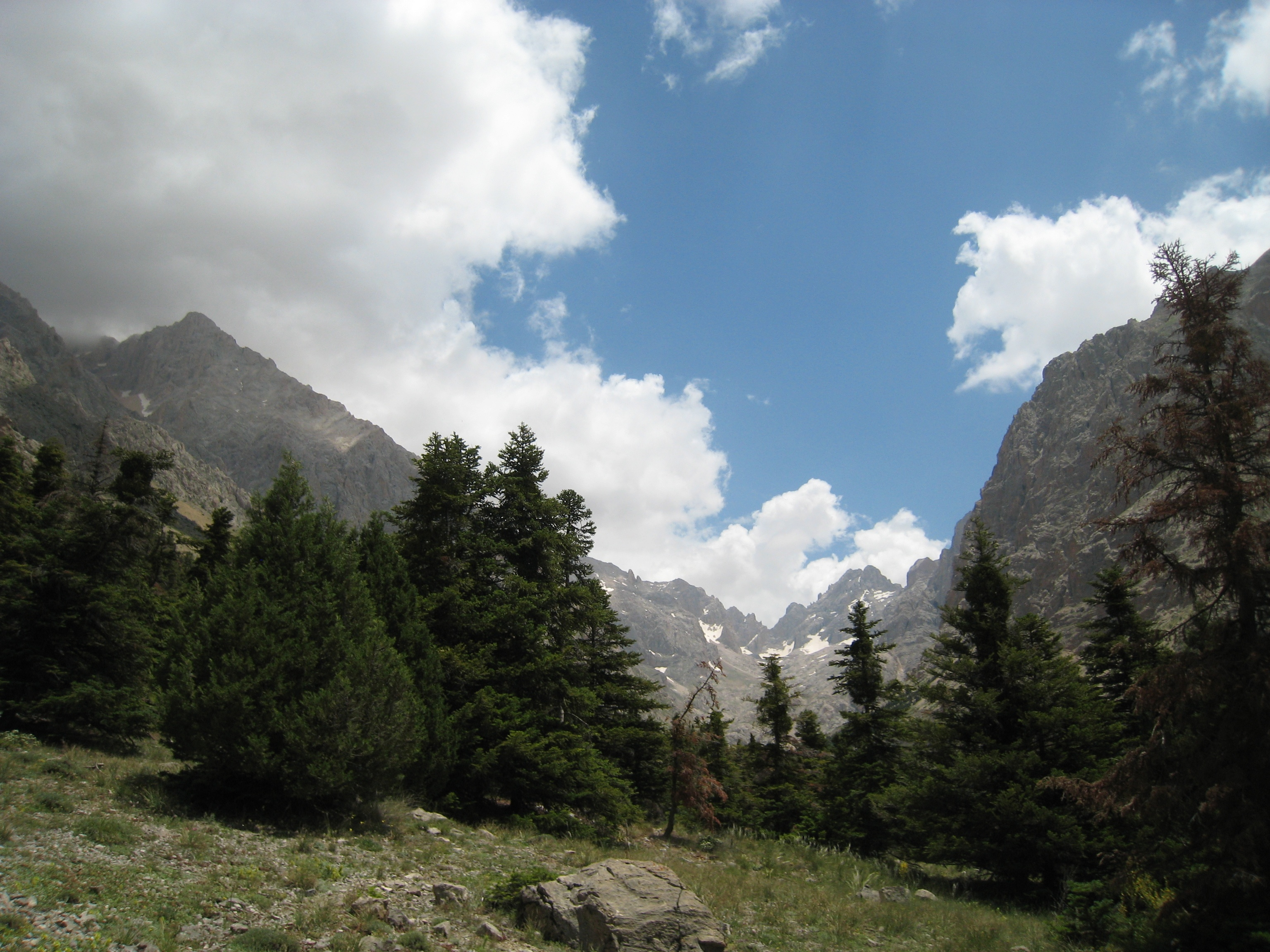
J. foetidissima, in the Taurus Mountains, Turkey

== Distribution ==
The tree is native to southeastern Europe and Western Asia, from southern Albania and northern Greece, southern North Macedonia, across Turkey to Syria and the Lebanon, the Caucasus mountains, the Alborz mountains of northern Iran, and east to southwestern Turkmenistan. There is also an isolated population in the Crimea.

A number of notably large specimens are specially protected in Turkey; the largest is the Aslanardıçı ("Lion Juniper"), 25 m (82 ft) tall and 3.38 m (11 ft) in trunk diameter, estimated to be 1,700 years old.
