= Dalbergia louvelii =

Conservation status
- Endangered (IUCN 3.1)

Scientific classification
- Kingdom: Plantae
- Clade: Embryophytes
- Clade: Tracheophytes
- Clade: Spermatophytes
- Clade: Angiosperms
- Clade: Eudicots
- Clade: Rosids
- Order: Fabales
- Family: Fabaceae
- Subfamily: Faboideae
- Genus: Dalbergia
- Species: D. louvelii

Binomial name
- Dalbergia louvelii R.Vig.

Species of legume

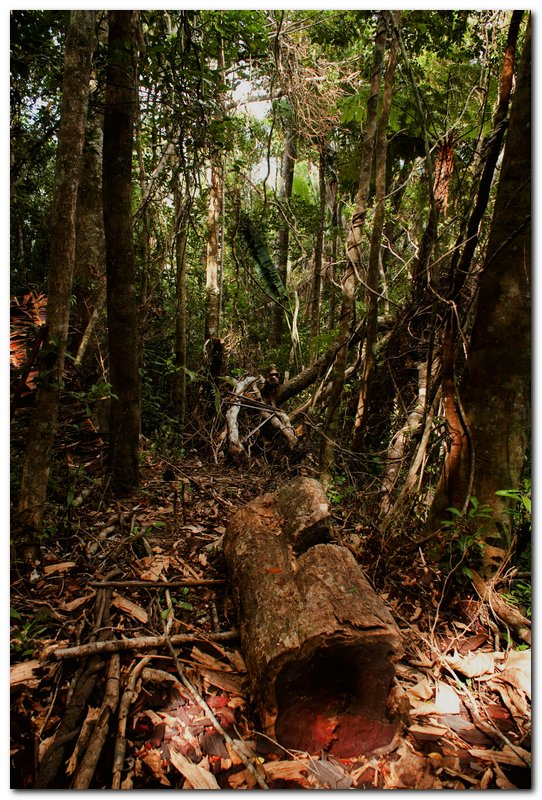
Illegally felled Dalbergia louvelii in Marojejy National Park

Dalbergia louvelii (violet rosewood) is a species of legume in the family Fabaceae. It is a tree endemic to eastern Madagascar. It is threatened by habitat loss.
