= Chinese furniture =

Style of furniture

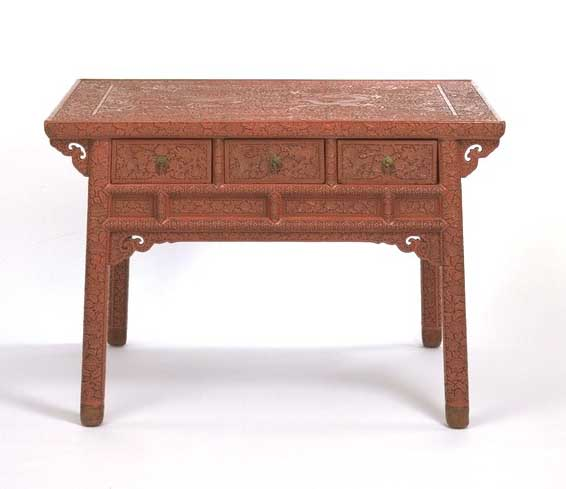
Ming imperial table in carved lacquer, early 15th century

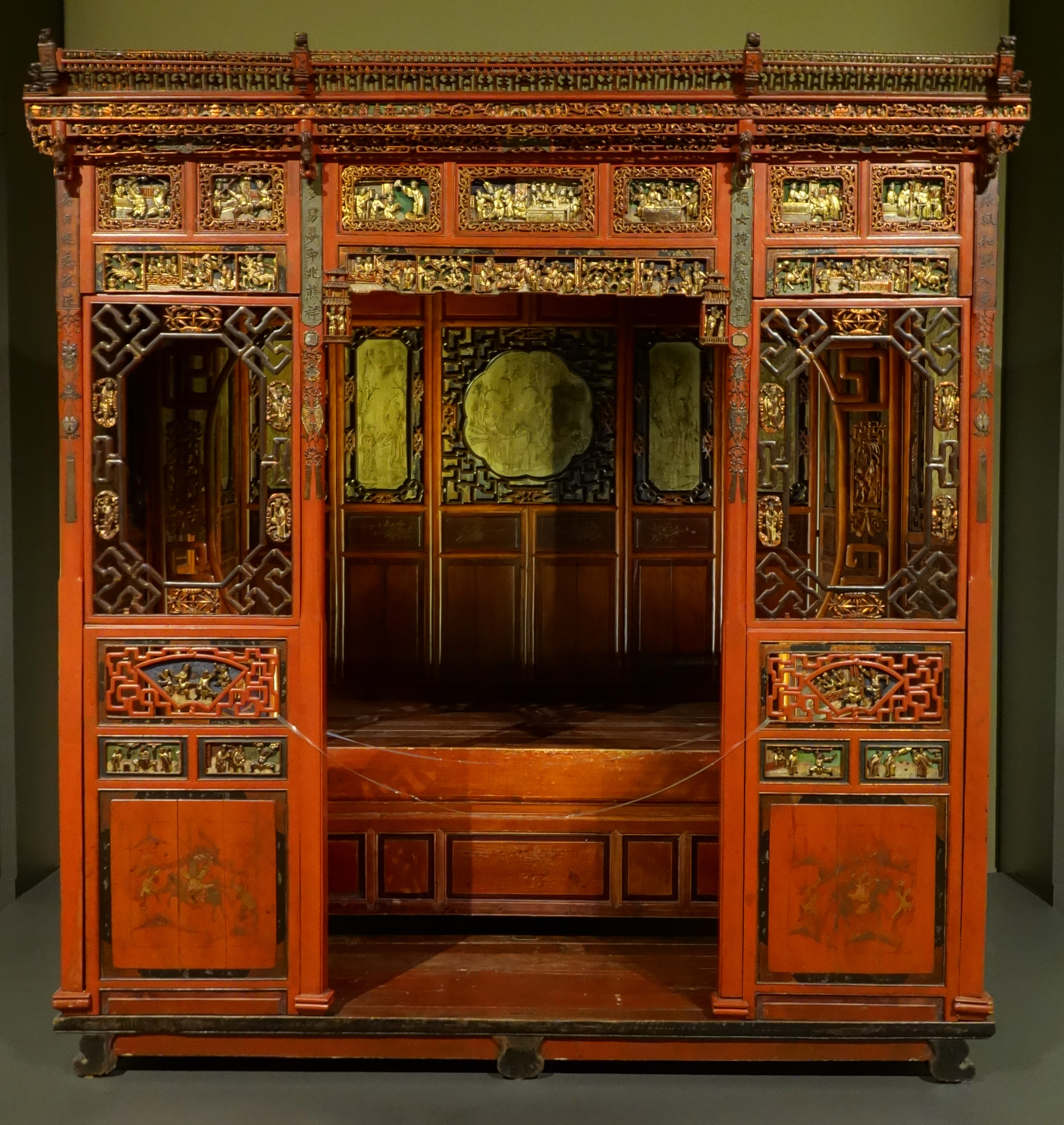
Canopy bed, late 19th or early 20th century

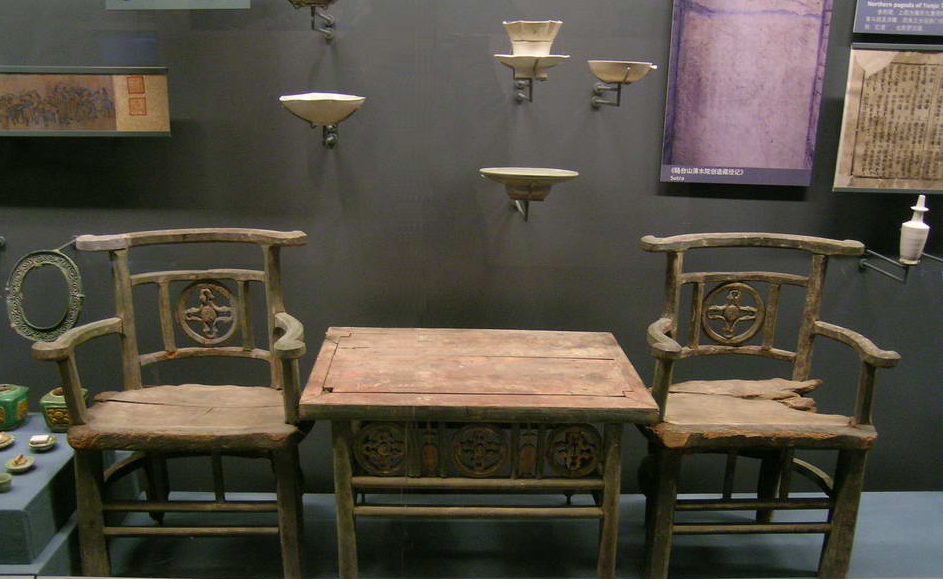
Furniture made during the Liao dynasty, excavated from the underground palace in Tian Kai Ta, in Fangshan District of Beijing

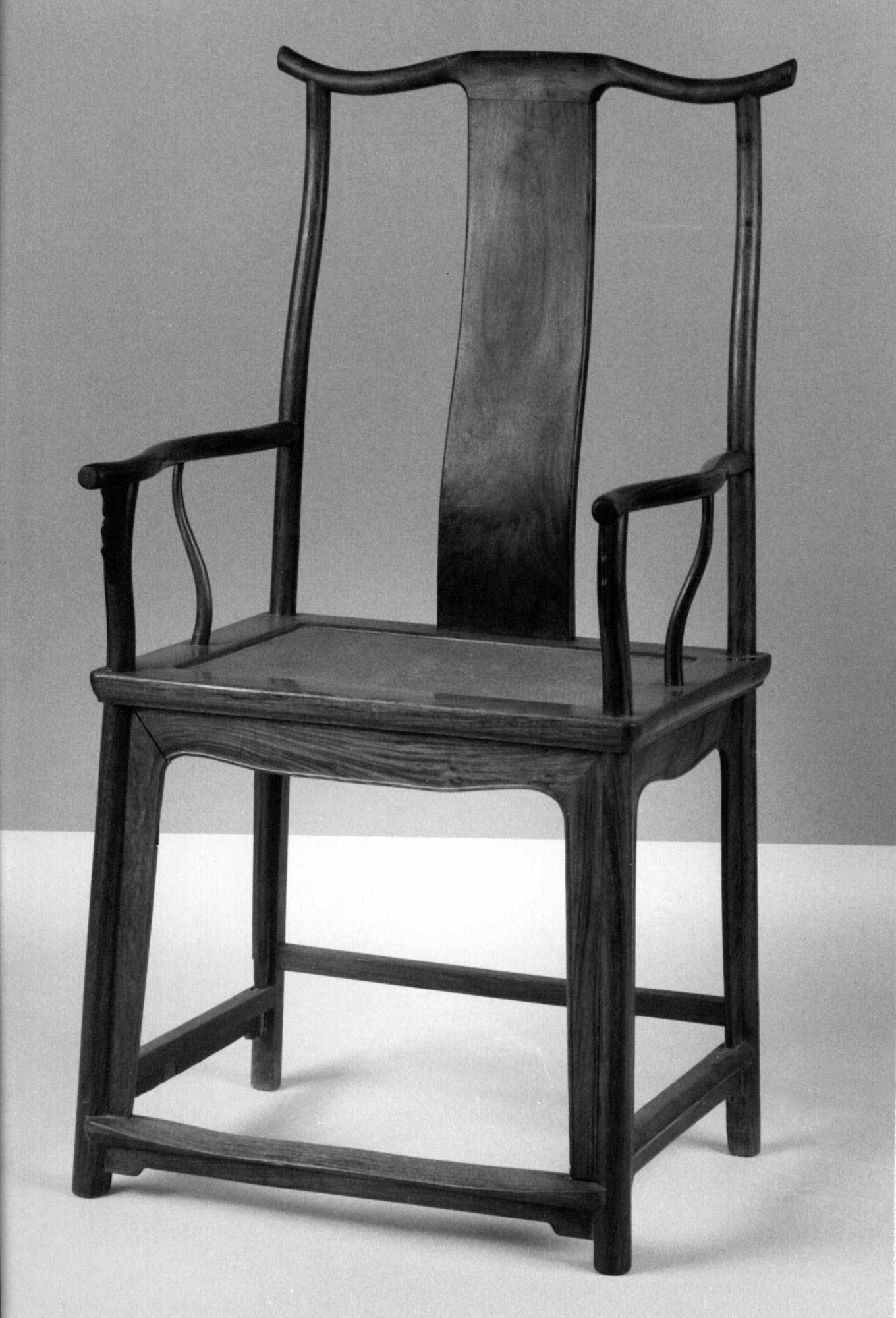
A yoke-back chair from the Metropolitan Museum of Art.

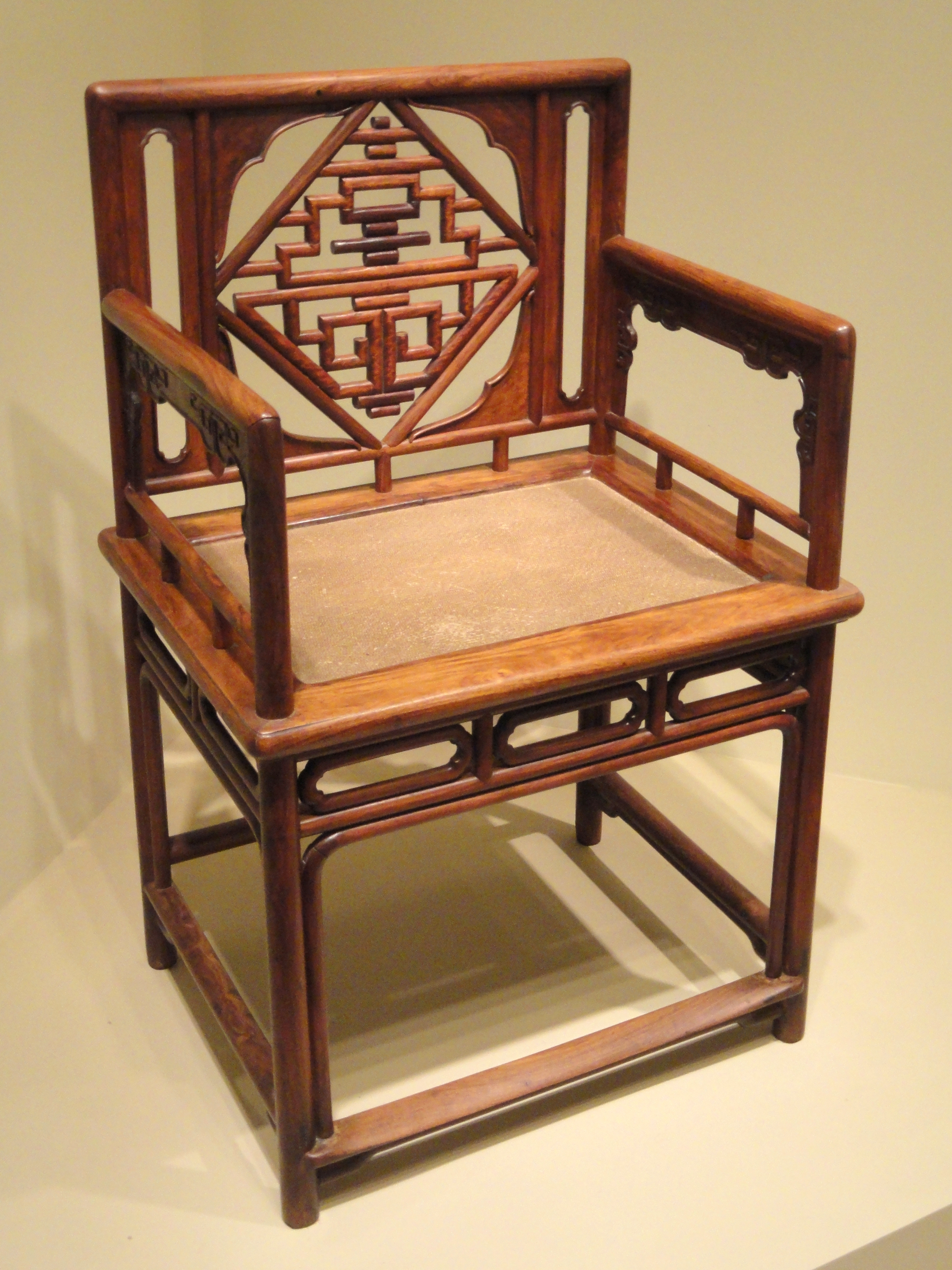
Low-back armchair, late 16th-18th century AD, huanghuali rosewood

A Ming era Ta couch from the Shanghai Museum

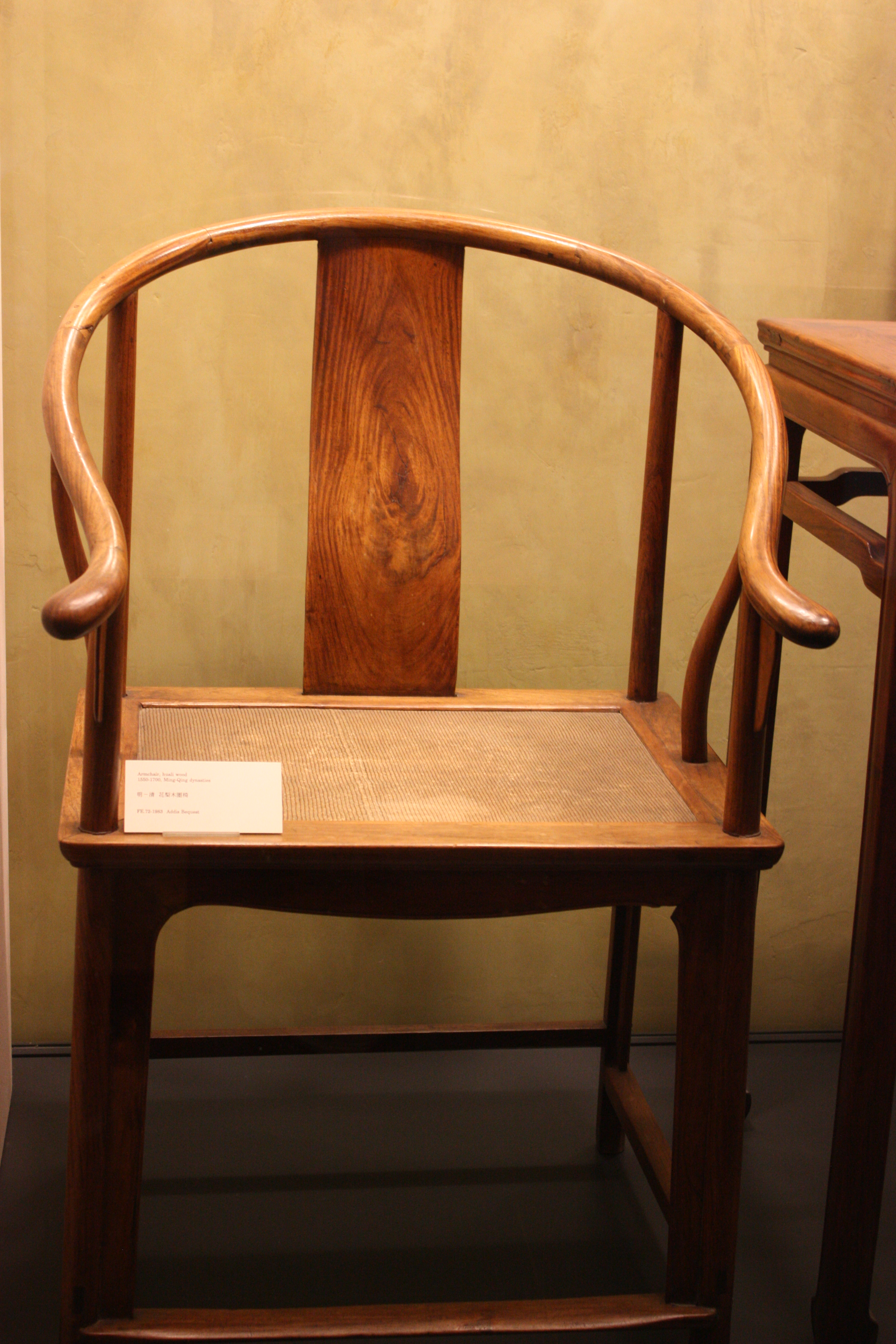
A Huali wood Quanyi (圈椅）Circular Chairs from Victoria and Albert Museum.

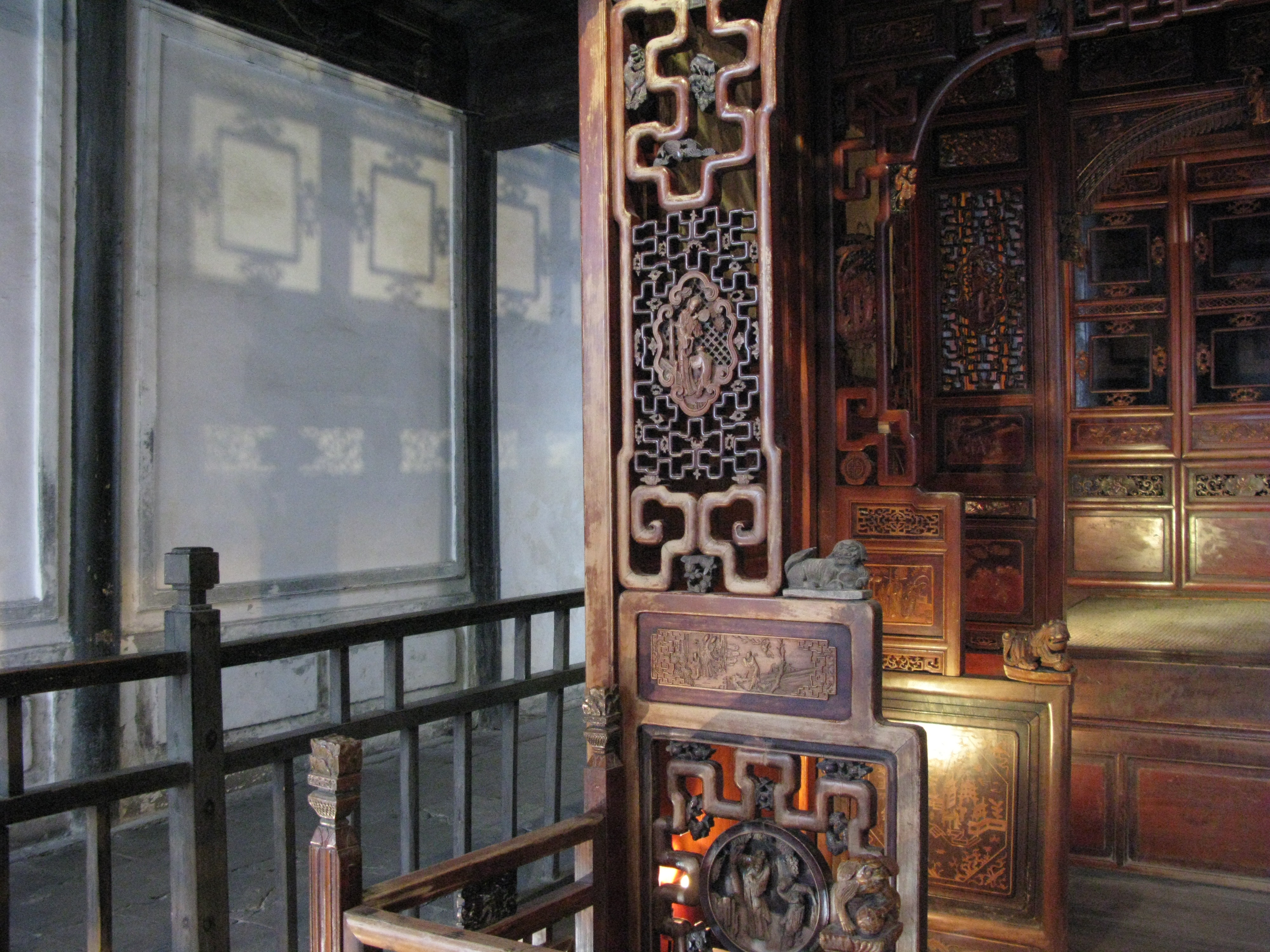
An example of openwork carving of a bed frame in Wuzhen.

The forms of Chinese furniture evolved along three distinct lineages which date back to 1000 BC: frame and panel, yoke and rack (based on post-and-rail seen in architecture) and bamboo construction techniques. Chinese home furniture evolved independently of Western furniture into many similar forms, including chairs, tables, stools, cupboards, cabinets, beds and sofas. Until about the 10th century CE, the Chinese sat on mats or low platforms using low tables, but then gradually moved to using high tables with chairs.

Chinese furniture is mostly in plain, polished wood, but from at least the Song dynasty, the most luxurious pieces often used lacquer to cover the whole or parts of the visible areas. All the various sub-techniques of Chinese lacquerware can be found on furniture, and became increasingly affordable down the social scale—thus widely used—from about the Ming dynasty onwards. Carved lacquer furniture was, at first, only affordable by the imperial family or the extremely rich, but by the 19th century, it was merely very expensive, and mostly found in smaller pieces or as decorated areas on larger ones. It was especially popular on screens, which were common in China. Lacquer inlaid with mother of pearl was a technique used especially on furniture.

Chinese furniture is usually light, whenever possible, anticipating Europe by several centuries in this respect. Practical fittings in metal such as hinges, lock plates, drawer handles and protective plates at edges or feet are used and often given considerable emphasis, but compared to classic European fine furniture, purely decorative metal mounts were rare. From the Qing dynasty, furniture made for export, mostly to Europe, became a distinct style, generally made in rather different shapes to suit the destination markets and highly decorated in lacquer and other techniques.

Early traditional Chinese furniture for sitting or lying on was not often covered with soft material. Not until very late historical periods, were cushions, textiles, and other forms of upholstery incorporated into Chinese furniture, impacted by Western culture. Openwork in carved wood or other techniques is very typical for practical purposes such as chair-backs, and also for decoration. The Ming period is regarded as the "golden age" of Chinese furniture, though very few examples of earlier pieces survive. Ming styles have largely set the style for furniture in traditional Chinese style in subsequent periods, though as in other areas of Chinese art, the 18th and 19th centuries saw increasing prosperity used for sometimes excessively elaborated pieces, as wider groups in society were able to imitate court styles.

== Cultural context ==
What is now considered the Chinese aesthetic had its origins in China as far back as 1500–1000 BC. The furniture present in some of the artwork from that early period shows woven mats on elevated floors, sometimes accompanied by arm rests, providing seating accompanied by low tables. In this early period both unadorned and intricately engraved and painted pieces were already developing. High chairs, usually single ones, had existed as status symbols, effectively thrones, since at least the Eastern Zhou period (771–256 BCE), but were not used with tables at the same level.

The use of screens has been recorded since the Shang and Zhou dynasties, which shows that society is in civilization and society is in progress. It plays a role in dividing space and beautifying the environment. It has privacy, comfort and security.

The Han dynasty still sat on the ground, and indoor life was centered on beds and couch. The function of beds was not only to sleep, but also to have meals, conversations and other activities. A large number of portrait bricks and stones of the Han dynasty reflected such scenes. The bed is slightly different from the couch. The bed is higher than the couch and wider than the couch. Moreover, in this era, curtains were used, and curtains set on beds also played an important role, indicating that society was in the progress of civilization, avoiding mosquitoes in summer and keeping out the wind and cold in winter. At the same time, they played a role of beautification and were also a sign of identity and wealth.

Buddhism, entering China around AD 200, brought with it the idea of (the Buddha) sitting upon a raised platform instead of simply mats. The platform was adopted as an honorific seat for special guests and dignitaries or officials. Longer versions were then used for reclining as well, which eventually evolved into the bed and daybed. Taller versions evolved into higher tables as well. The folding stool also proliferated similarly, after it was adapted from designs developed by nomadic tribes to the North and West, who used them for both their convenience and light weight in many applications such as mounting horses. Later, woven hourglass-shaped stools evolved; a design still in use today throughout China.

Some of the styles now widely regarded as Chinese began appearing more prominently in the Tang dynasty (618–907 AD). It is here that evidence of early versions of the round and yoke back chairs are found, generally used by the elite. By the next two dynasties (the Northern and Southern Song) the use of varying types of furniture, including chairs, benches, and stools was common throughout Chinese society. Two particular developments were recessed legs and waisted tables. Newer and more complex designs were generally limited to official and higher class use.

In the Song dynasty, high furniture for sitting with feet hanging occupied an absolutely dominant position. Sitting with feet hanging has become a fixed posture, and the daily life in Chinese history has been fundamentally changed, which depends on the sitting posture. Furniture in the Song dynasty shows the characteristics of straightness and beauty in its overall style. Its decoration inherits the style of the Five Dynasties and tends to be simple and elegant. It does not make large-scale carving decoration, but only takes local decorations to make the finishing point.

At the beginning of the Qing dynasty, the style of Ming style furniture was continued. Chinese traditional furniture technology developed to the Yongzheng and Qianlong periods of the Qing dynasty, forming a Qing style school different from Ming style furniture. The Qing dynasty experienced the Kangxi, Yongzheng and Qianlong periods, and there was a luxurious and decadent trend of blindly pursuing richness, luxury, and red tape in social culture at that time. There is a strong contrast with Ming style furniture, so it is called "Qing style" furniture in the history of furniture in China. Qing style furniture is made of thick and heavy materials, and its variety and decoration pursue innovation. The decoration of Qing style furniture seeks more, fullness, wealth and splendor. A variety of materials are used together, and a variety of processes are combined.

More modern Chinese furniture developed its distinguishing characteristics. The use of thick lacquer finish and detailed engraving and painted decoration as well as pragmatic design elements would continue to flourish. Significant foreign design influence would not be felt until increased contact with the West began in the 19th century, due to efforts on the part of the ruling elite to limit trade.

In recent decades, there has been a trend of redesigning Chinese furniture from a more modern perspective. The quality and innovation of the furniture associated with what has already become known as ‘New Chinese Design’ is expected to prompt a significant reappraisal of contemporary Chinese design. Notably, New Chinese Design is foremost a design reform movement. Ideologically guided, it has been responsible for a renaissance within Chinese furniture design, the first shoots of which emerged in isolation with the designs of Samuel Chan in Britain during the late 1980s. The process of integrating traditional culture and contemporary style in furniture was initiated by designers such as Zhu Xiaojie, Chi Wing Lo, Chen Renyi, Shan Fan, Shi Jianmin, and Song Tao, but many others have since joined the movement, notably Lv Yongzhong, Lydon Neri, Rossana Hum Jiang Qiong’er, Jeff Shi Dayu, Wen Hao, Shen Baohong, Studio MVW, Chen Darui, Zhong Song, Chen Yanfei, and Jerry Chen.

During the Ming and Qing dynasties, previous bans on imports were lifted, allowing for larger quantities and varieties of woods to flood in from other parts of Asia. The use of denser wood led to much finer work, including more elaborate joinery. A Ming Imperial table entirely covered in carved lacquer, now in London, is one of the finest survivals of the period.

== Ming dynasty furniture ==
Chinese furniture flourished in Ming and Qing dynasties; as the ault, the Ming-style furniture and the Qing-style furniture become ahe representative traditional Chinese furniture people often see today. Suzhou, an area in Jiangsu Province, is distinguished by the fine production techniques of Ming-style furniture. Thus, Ming-style furniture is also known as Suzhou-style furniture.

The Wishbone chair by Danish designer Hans Wegner was inspired by Ming-style chairs.

=== Shape, style and culture ===
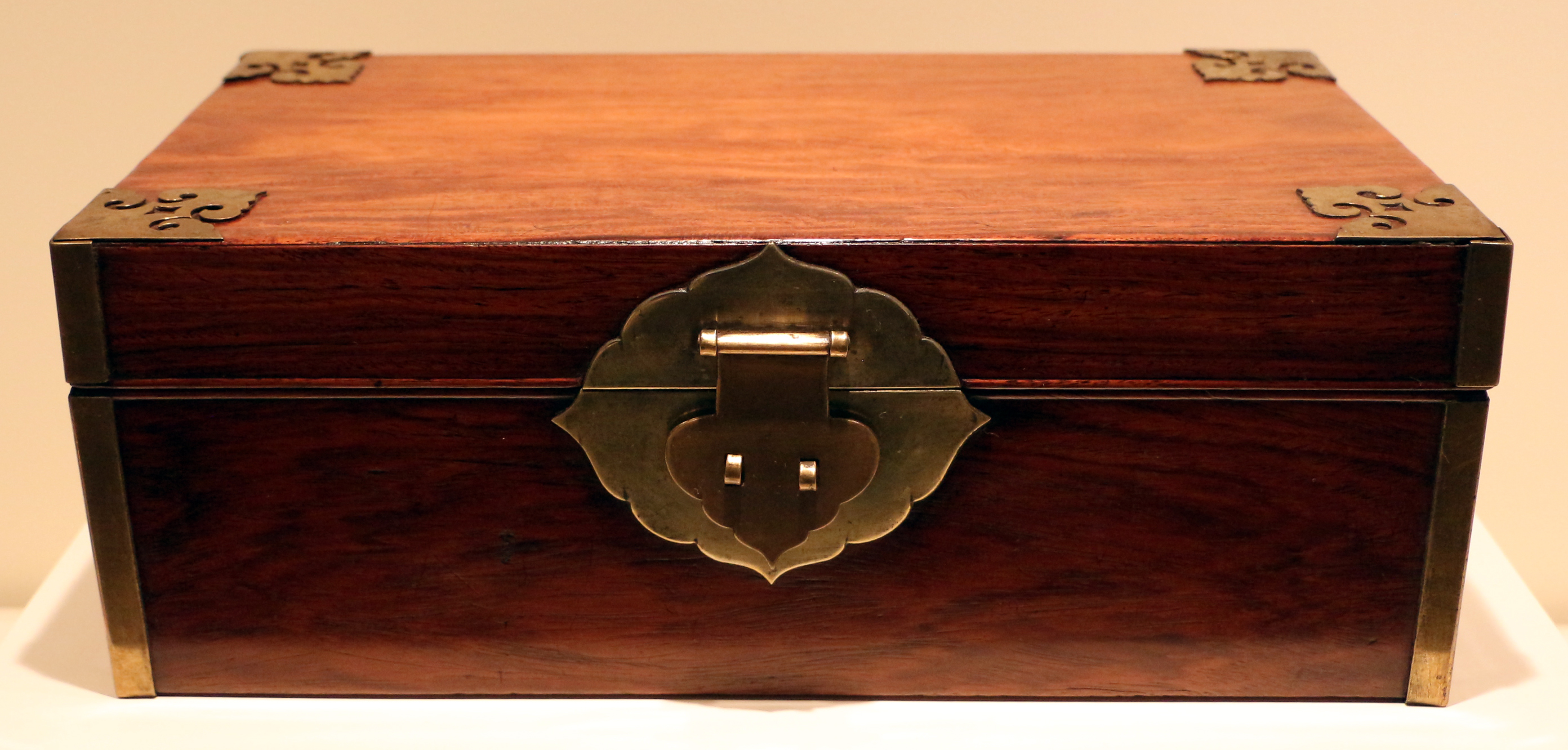
A wooden jewel case from Indianapolis Museum of Art

Ming dynasty furniture is distinguished by its simplicity of shape. It does not focus on the rich and complicated decorative patterns but the elegance of style and the beauty of lines. Ming furniture stresses the smoothness of lines: it looks unobtrusive, blends curves and straight lines, and creates a sense of balance and harmony. This feature is particularly prominent in the Quanyi (圈椅 pinyin: Quānyǐ) Circular Chairs, an example of the combination of curves and lines. Moreover, Ming furniture is noted by its ergonomic design. It attaches importance to the rationality of scale and curvature, which makes people feel comfortable while sitting on a hard wooden chair. For example, the backrest of Ming furniture is in the shape of "S" or "C". This special shape conforms to the characteristics of the human spine curve, allowing people to sit on their backs to rest and relieve fatigue. The round crescent armrest of the chair has a natural slope from high to low, allowing people to rest their shoulders and arms on the arc-shaped armrests. Overall, the function and aesthetics of Ming furniture are emphasized by its unique shape and refined structure.

Culture has a deep impact on traditional Chinese throughout history. Taking Ming dynasty furniture as an example, artistic symbolism reflects the philosophy of ancient Chinese culture. Both the pleasing aesthetics and the symbolic meaning of Ming dynasty furniture contribute to advocating the Chinese style towards contemporary home furnishing. As a visualization of Confucian philosophy, the form and auspicious decorative patterns of Ming dynasty furniture symbolize the expression of Neutralization thought, the thought of harmony, the importance of going into the world, which encourages the user to be more practical and more responsible. Altogether, design of Ming dynasty furniture reflects people's pursuit of wealth, peace, harmony and rights.

=== Decoration ===
Ming furniture pursues small and refined decoration, which results in a moderate and artistic decoration style. The main decoration methods in Ming furniture include inlay, carving, and lacquerware. Various materials are used in inlay, including enamel, bamboo, animal's horn or teeth, jade, stone, copper, etc. However, Ming furniture does not aim to have all the luxuries in one piece, instead highlighting the beauty of wood through the raw materials. Partial or small area relief and openwork became the primary means of decoration in many Ming furniture examples; swastika, cloud, and Ruyi are the common patterns for this type of decoration. Additionally, the application of metal accessories is another major feature of Ming furniture decoration. Copper, the most commonly used metal in Ming furniture, is usually decorated on the corners, feet, and handles of the furniture. These metal fittings not only serve aesthetic purposes, but simultaneously enhance wear resistance.

=== Material ===
Ming furniture is made of a wide range of materials, including wood, stone, and other auxiliary materials. The choice of wood is usually hardwood, such as huanghuali (黄花梨pinyin: Huáng huālí), red sandalwood, rosewood, chicken-wing wood (鸡翅木pinyin: Jīchì mù), beech, and Cassia siamea. Among those hardwoods, huanghuali was especially popular in the Ming dynasty because of its texture, color, and odor. Among all the stone materials, marble, agate, and Nanyang stone are the common materials for inlay. Rattan, rope, and bamboo are often used as auxiliary materials in Ming furniture as well.

== Four categories ==
Chinese furniture traditionally consisted of four distinct categories, all formed by the mid Qing dynasty, but each with its own unique characteristics.

- Beijing category (京式家具pinyin: Jīng shì jiājù): characterized by its simple build, directly developed from Ming dynasty furnitures.
- Guangzhou category (广式家具pinyin: Guǎng shì jiājù): incorporating western influence, fully formed in the 19th century but dating back to at least 17th century. Characterized by the adoptation of Baroque and Rococo artistic styles, use of native timbers in the Lingnan region, and the decorative mounting of marble and the shells of shellfish.
- Shanghai category (海式家具pinyin: Hǎi shì jiājù): characterized by its decorative carving and carved lacquer.
- Suzhou category (苏式家具pinyin: Sū shì jiājù): Suzhou area is the main birthplace of Ming-style furniture in China, so Su-style furniture is a typical representative of Ming-style furniture.

== Material ==
Classic Chinese furniture is typically made of a class of hardwoods, known collectively as "rosewood" (紅木, literally "red wood")(紅木pinyin: Hóngmù). These woods are denser than water, fine grained, and high in oils and resins. These properties make them dimensionally stable, hardwearing, rot and insect resistant, and when new, highly fragrant. The density and toughness of the wood also allows furniture to be built without the use of glue and nail, but rather constructed from joinery and doweling alone. According to the Chinese industry standards the woods are grouped into eight classes:

Name	Chinese	Genus	Description
Huali wood	花黎木pinyin: Huā lí mù	Pterocarpus	Woods typically from Pterocarpus cambodianus, P. dalbergioides, P. erinaceus, P. indicus, P. macarocarpus, P. pedatus, and P. marsupium. This wood is known commercially in the West as "padauk".
Zitan wood	紫檀木pinyin: Zǐtán mù	Dalbergia, Pterocarpus	Wood from Dalbergia nigra, a burgundy-black wood that oxidizes into a purple-black colour. Highly valued. Other sources say that Zitan is not the same as Dalbergia nigra, which is commonly known as Brazilian rosewood, but that Zitan is Pterocarpus santalinus, commonly known as purple sandalwood, which is somewhat of an inaccurate name.
Hong suanzhi wood	紅酸枝木pinyin: Hóng suān zhī mù	Dalbergia	Reddish coloured woods that have a sour/acrid smell when freshly cut. The woods are typically from Dalbergia bariensis, D. cearensis, D. cochinchinensis, D. frulescensvar, D. granadillo, D. oliveri, and D. retusa
Hei suanzhi wood	黑酸枝木pinyin: Hēi suān zhī mù	Dalbergia	Dark coloured woods that have a sour/acrid smell when freshly cut. The woods are typically from D. cultrata, D. fusca, D. latifolia, D. louvelii, D. melanoxylon, D. nigra, D. spruceana, and D. stevensonii
Xiangzhi wood	香枝木pinyin: Xiāngzhī mù)	Dalbergia	The wood from Dalbergia odorifera and known commonly by the name "Huanghua li" (黄花梨, literally yellow flowered pear) or "Jiangxiang huangtan" (降香黄檀, literally fragrant yellow hardwood). This is one of the most valued and traditionally used hardwoods for Chinese furniture before its overharvesting from Chinese domestic sources.
Wu/Yinchen wood	烏木 / 陰沉木pinyin: Wūmù/ yīnchén mù	Diospyros	Typically refers to woods from Diospyros crassiflora, Diospyros ebenum, Diospyros pilosanthera, and D. poncei, which are known as ebony in the West. Name is sometimes mistakenly applied to Dalbergia nigra.
Striped Ebony wood	條紋烏木pinyin: Tiáowén wūmù	Diospyros	Woods from trees of genus Diospyros with vivid dark and light striations. Principally Diospyros blancoi, Diospyros celebica and Diospyros melanoxylon.
Phoenix tail or Chicken wing wood	雞翅木pinyin: Jīchì mù	Millettia and other genera	Woods which have a finely patterned, high contrast grain that is similar to the feathers of certain birds, such as chickens and partridges. The wood is taken typically from Millettia laurentii (非洲崖豆木), Millettia leucantha (白花崖豆木), Ormosia hosiei(相思木), and either Senna siamea or Mesua ferrea (鐵力木) but also from a wide variety of species including, Terminalia tomentosa, Diplotropis purpurea, Hymenolobium excelsum, Andira inermis, and Sterculia oblonga.

Furniture and carving made from these wood species are typically referred to, in the market, as "Hongmu Furniture" (紅木家具, literally "rosewood furniture")(紅木家具 pinyin: Hóngmù jiājù). Due to overlogging for the said furniture, most of the species are either threatened or endangered.

Chinese furniture using precious wood also has property attributes, which is appreciation. This is due to the use of precious hardwood and high labour costs, durability, and it can be passed on to future generations as property. Hardwoods like Huali Wood (花梨木 pinyin: Huālí mù) and Suanzhi (酸枝 pinyin: Suān zhī) are the most representative, and the price of the raw material spiked over the past decades. Taking Huali Wood as an example, one of the most famous and expensive precious wood, the price skyrockets due to the scarcity of old trees. The growth cycle of Hualimu tree is extremely long making it unimaginably difficult to become timber—800 years. By the end of the Ming dynasty, all of Hualimu tree was felled in China. The price of Hualimu is 8-12 million RMB (approximately 1.5-2.4 million CAD) per ton in 2004. In 2020, the price increased to 18 million RMB (approximately 3.4 million CAD) per ton and is expected to keep increasing. In China, some manufacturers grasped this opportunity by replicating the traditional design from precious hardwood with the help of machinery making the old design more accessible to certain consumers. There is a niche market for high-end collectors to appreciate traditional Chinese furniture not only for the timeless design but also the opportunity to invest or to show social status.

== Construction ==
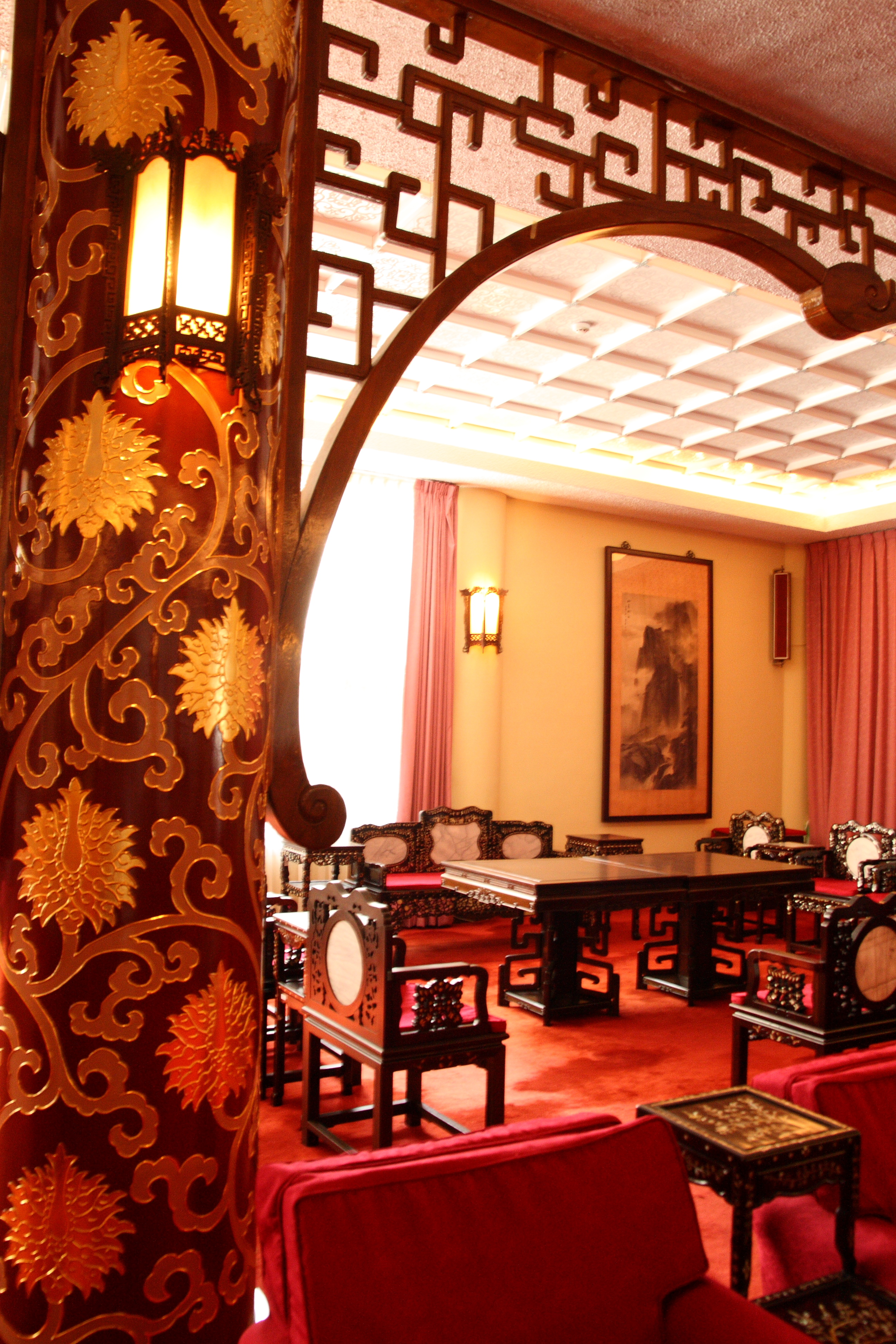
Chinese furniture in Taipei's Zhongshan Building

Construction of traditional wooden Chinese furniture is based primarily of solid wood pieces connected solely using woodworking joints, and rarely using glue or metallic nails. The reason was that the nails and glues used did not stand up well to the vastly fluctuating temperatures and humid weather conditions in most of Central and Southeast Asia. Further, the oily and resinous woods used in Chinese furniture generally do not glue well, even when pre-cleaned with modern industrial solvents.

Platform construction is based on box designs and uses frame-and-panel construction in simple form during earlier periods evolving into more and more modified forms in later periods. While earlier pieces show full frame-and-panel construction techniques, different parts of the construction were modified through the centuries to produce diverse looking pieces which still share the same basic construction. First the panel, originally complete, is subject to cut-out sections, followed by further reduction to what may appear to be simply decorative brackets. Further refinement of the same pattern lead the shape of the decorative brackets being incorporated into the shape of the surrounding frame and simultaneously the two mitered vertical pieces comprising a corner become one solid piece. Pieces start to have small cross-pieces attached to the bottom of the feet rather than a frame that is equal on all sides and finally, with evolution of the complex woodworking joints that allow it, the cross-pieces are removed entirely, leaving a modern table with 3-way mitered corners. Unlike European-derived styles, table designs based on this style will nearly always contain a frame-in-panel top, the panel serving as the tabletop center and the frame sometimes also serving as what would be rails on a European table. Cabinets in this style have a top that does not protrude beyond the sides or front. The critical element in almost all pieces of this type is the mitered joints, especially the 3-way mitered joining of the leg and two horizontal pieces at each corner.

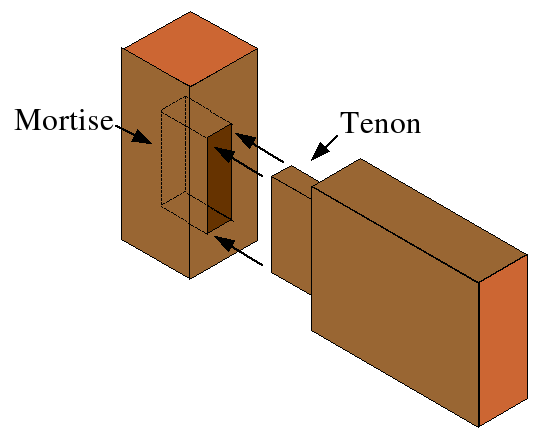
Mortise and Tenon Joint, drawn by Jim Thomas

The yoke and rack construction differs critically in the way that the legs of the piece are joined to the horizontal portion (be it tabletop, seat or cabinet carcass) using a type of wedged mortise-and-tenon joint where the end grain of the leg is visible as a circle in the frame of the tabletop. The cross-pieces (stretchers in the Western equivalent) are joined through mortise-and-tenon joinery as well. A mortise (卯 pinyin: Mǎo) is a slot or recess, and a tenon (榫pinyin: Sǔn) is the projecting end of a piece of wood formed to fit into a corresponding mortise. Mortise-and-tenon joinery is an extremely old construction technique that has stood the test of time and is still being used today. The legs and stretchers are commonly round rather than square or curvilinear. The simplest pieces are simply four splayed legs attached to a solid top, but more complicated pieces contain decorative brackets, drawers and metal latches. Cabinets in this style typically have an overhanging top, similar to Western-style cabinetry.

Bamboo construction style, although historically rooted in pieces made from bamboo, later saw many pieces made from hardwood with patterning to imitate the look of bamboo, or simply in the style of previous pieces made from bamboo. The construction is more similar to the yoke and rack style with some apparent crossover.

== Gallery ==
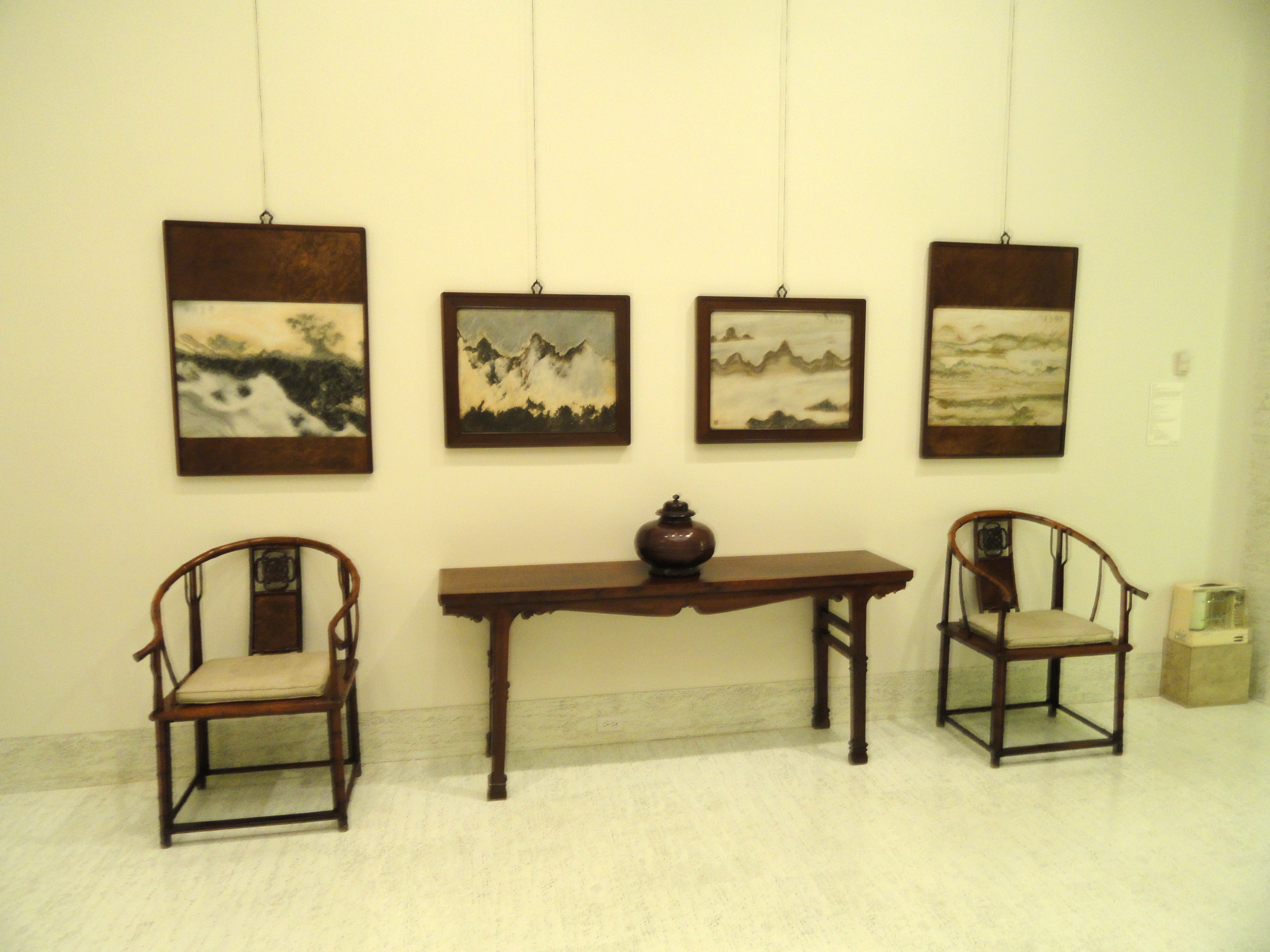
Huanghuali wood furniture, China, - Nelson-Atkins Museum of Art

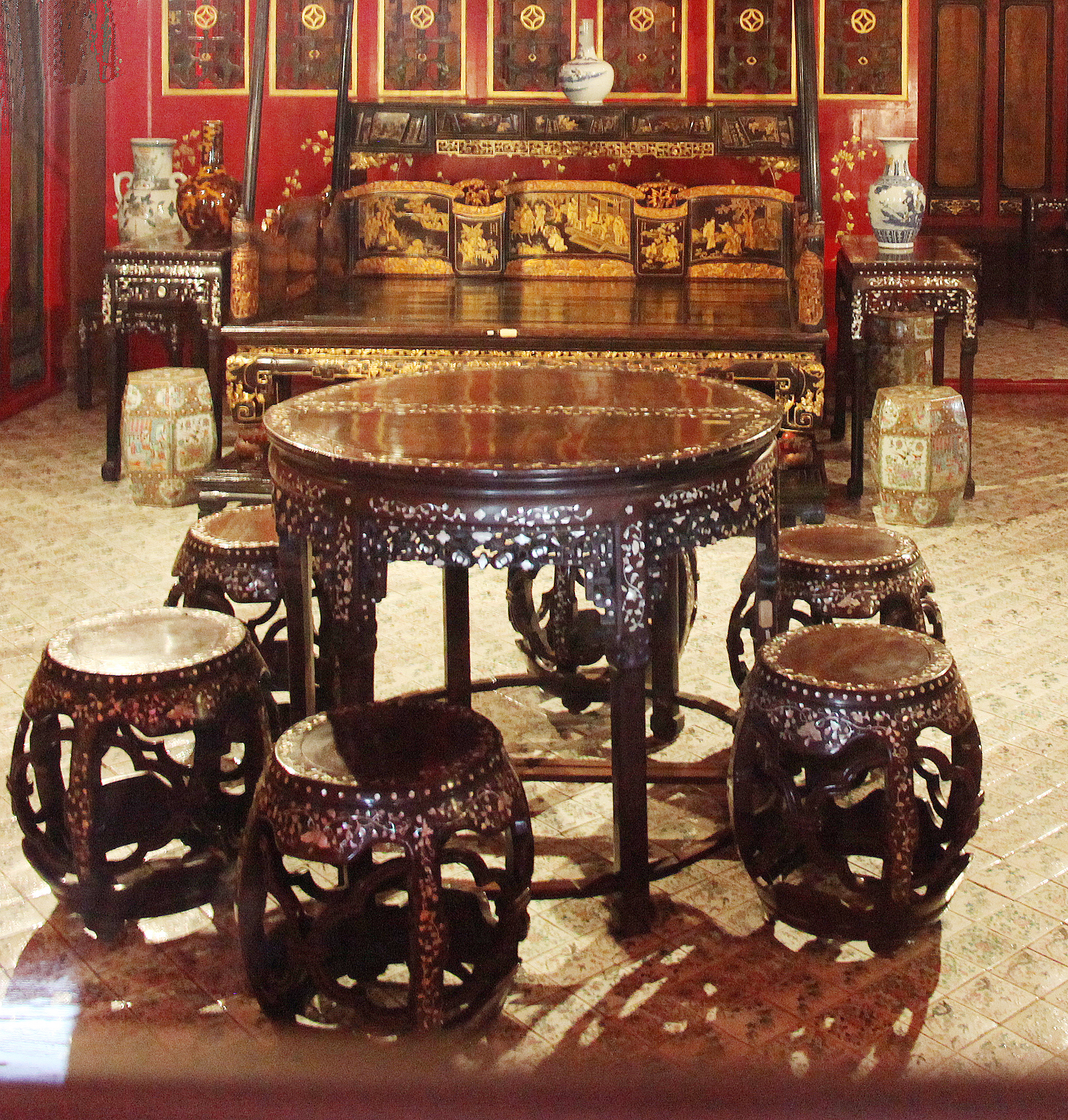
Chinese style furniture in Bang Pa In Chinese style palace

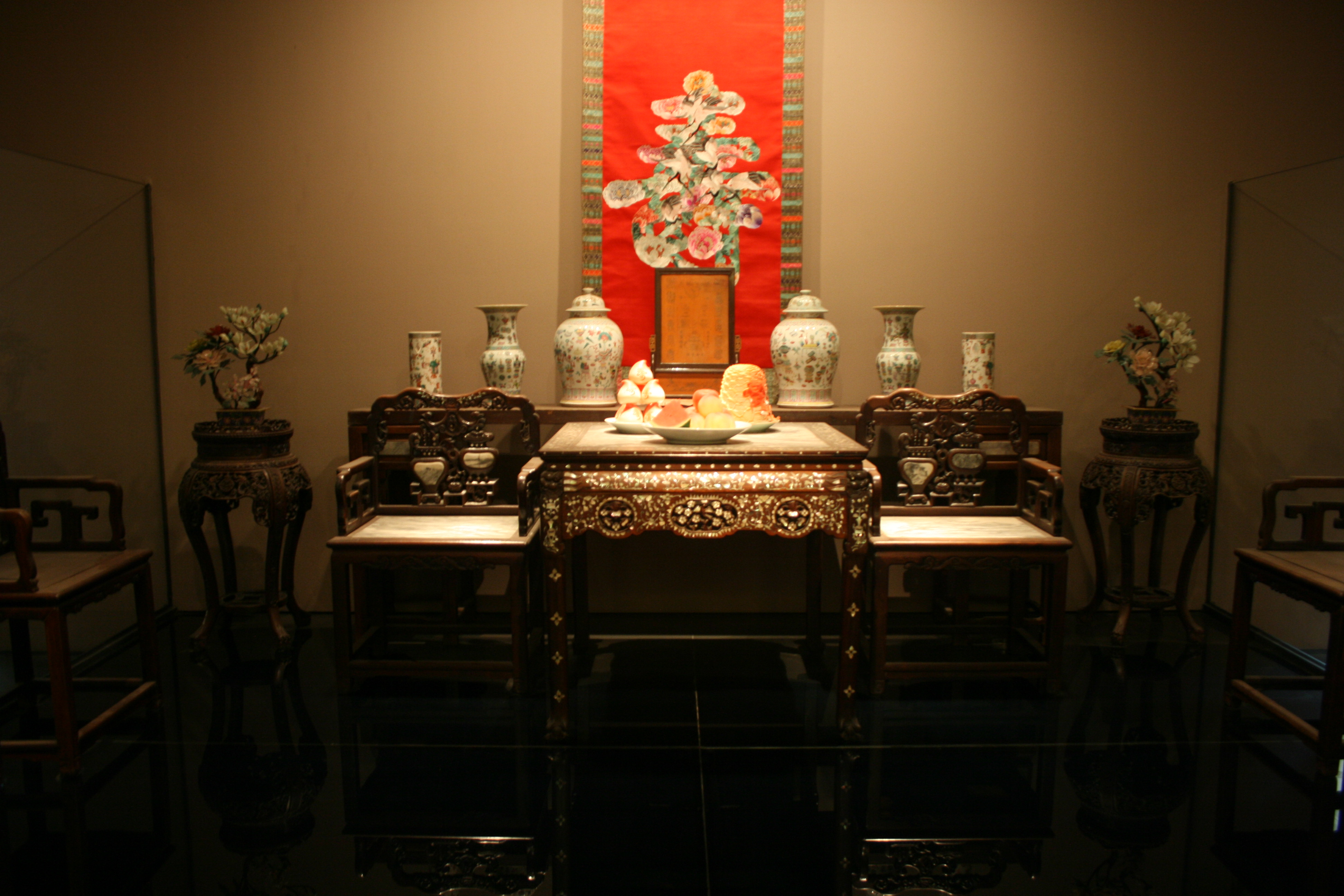
Qing Furniture

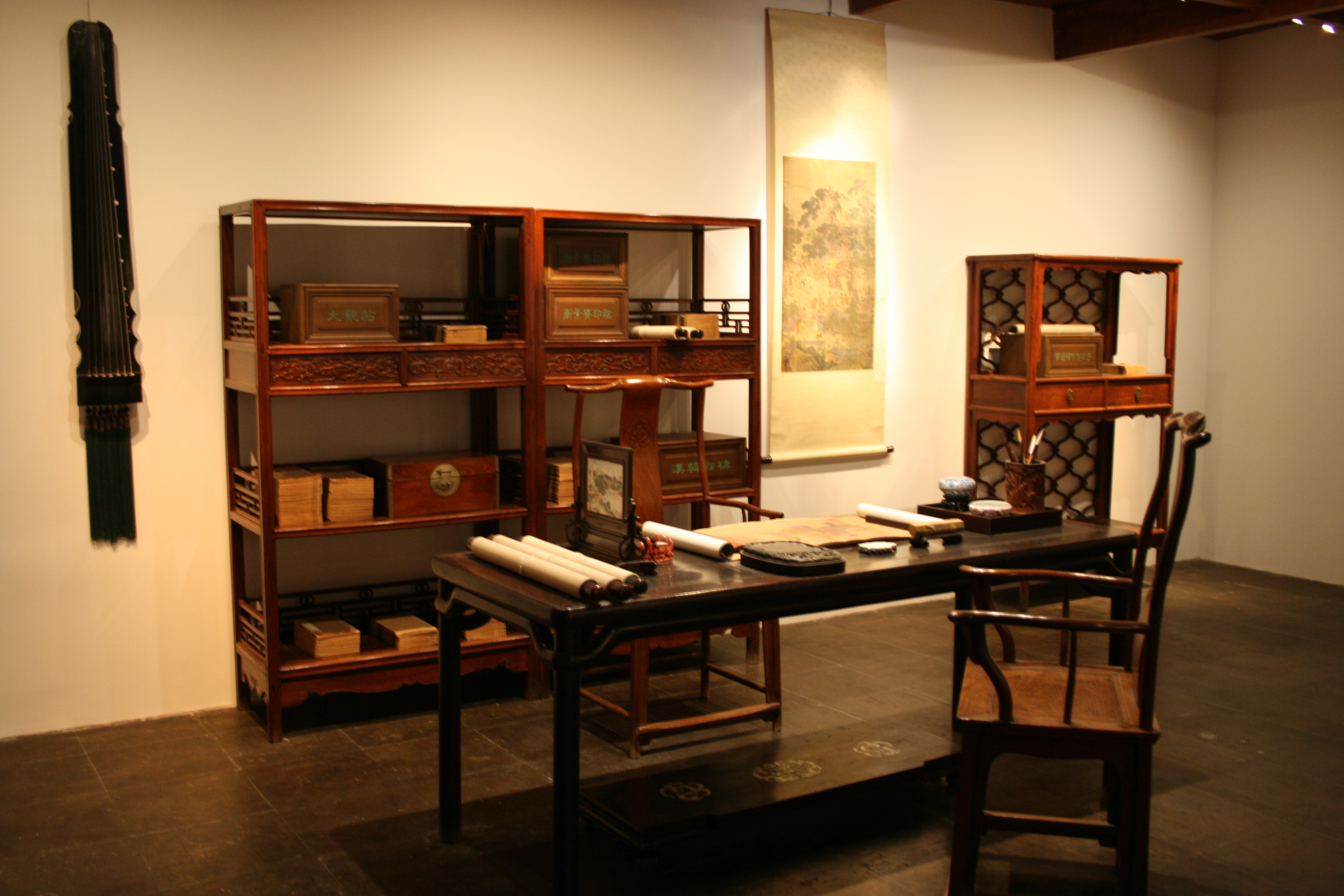
Ming Furniture

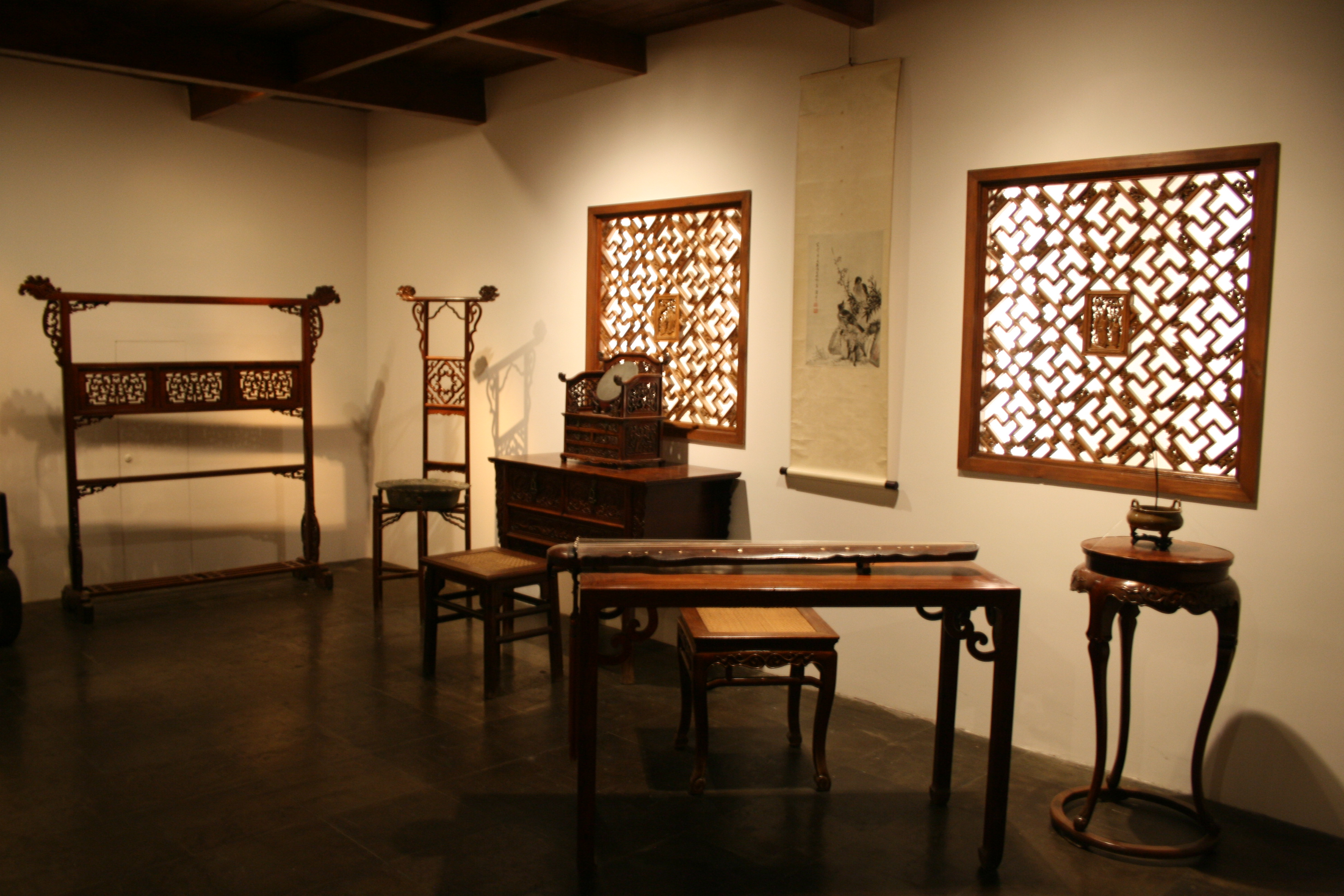
Ming Furniture

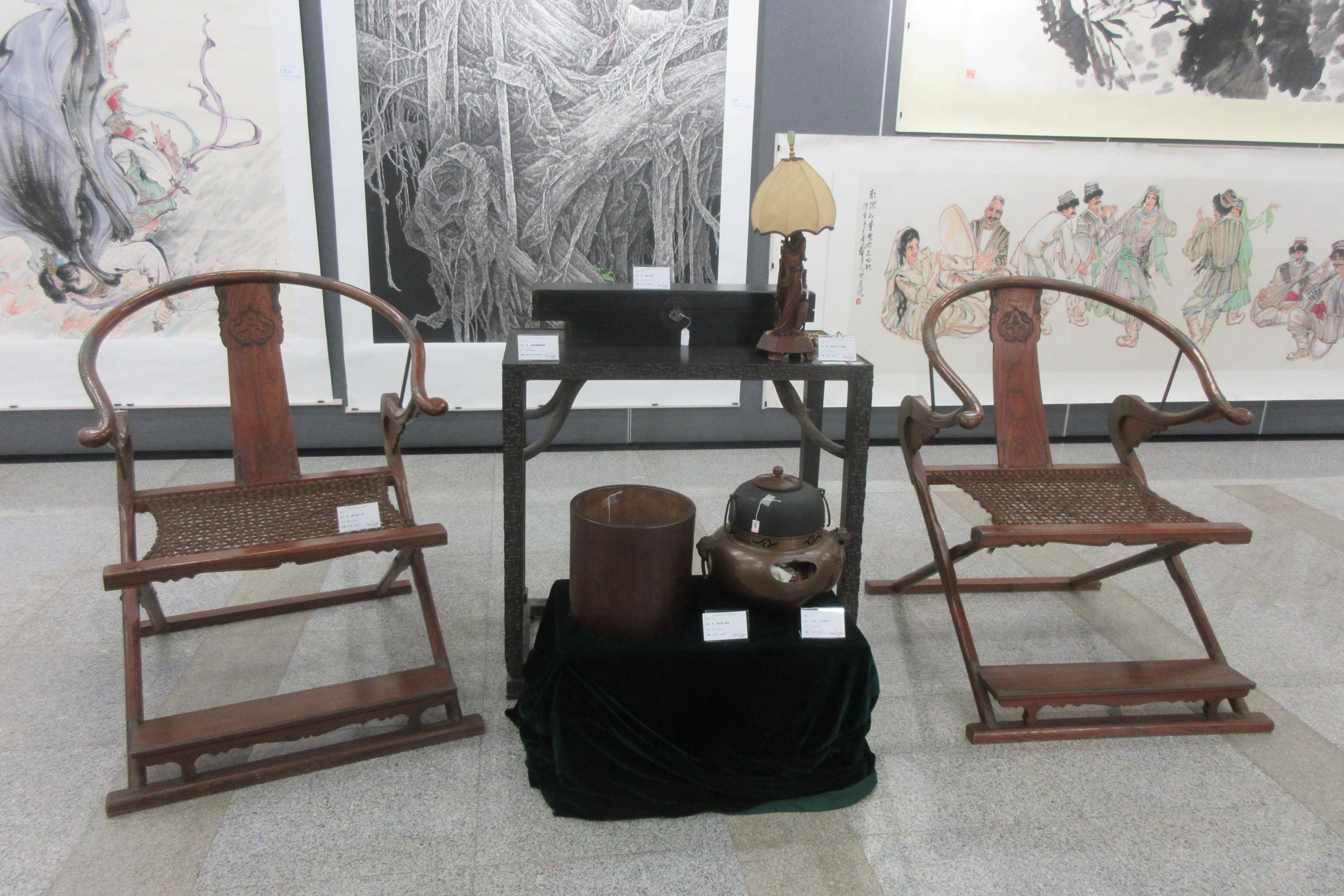
Chinese furniture armchairs

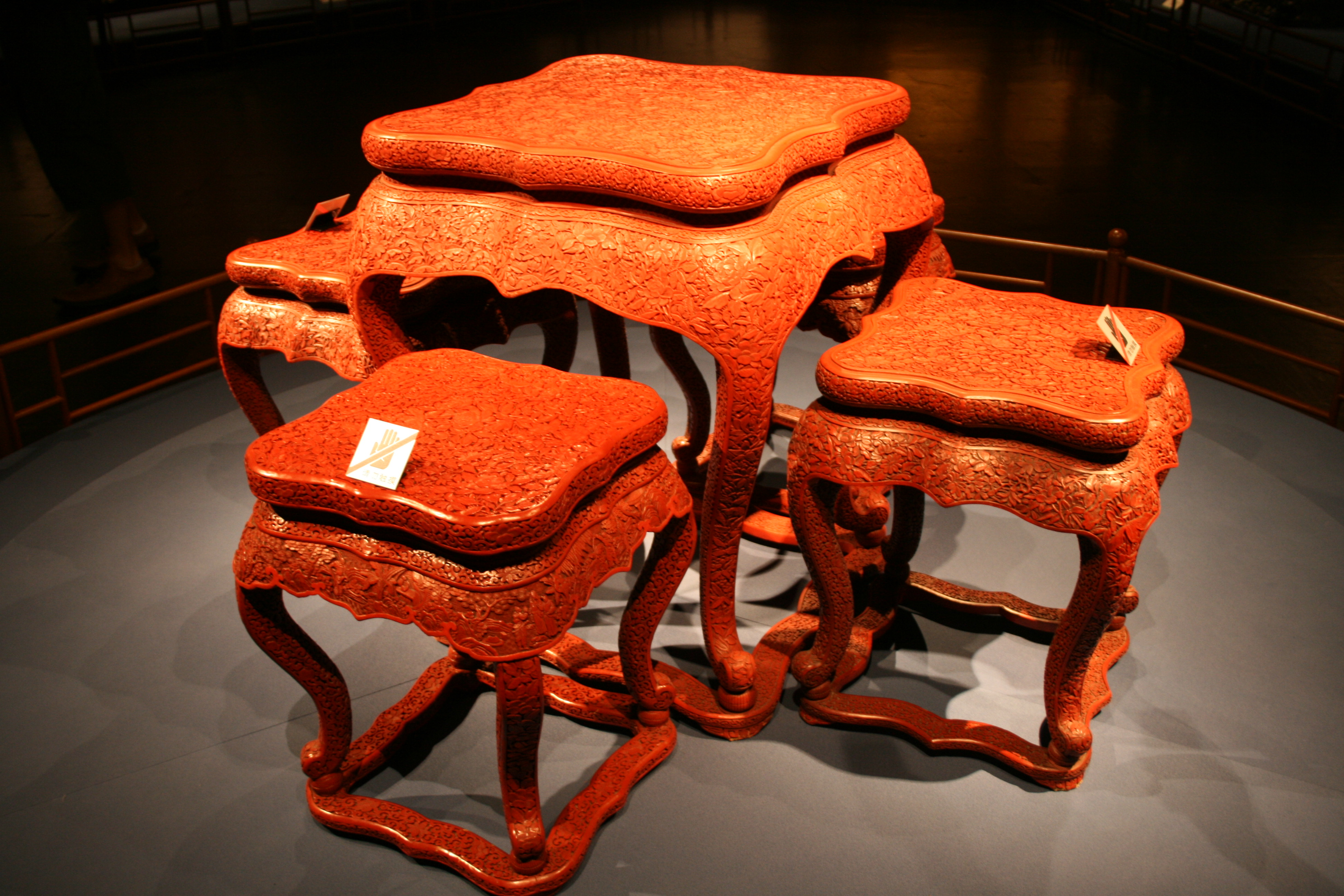
Qing Red Lacquer Furniture

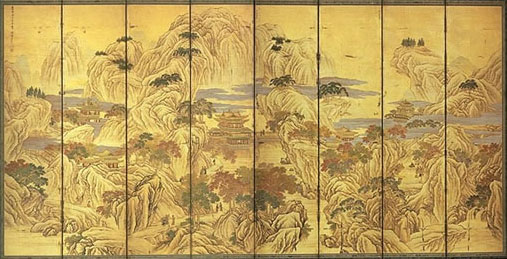
Landscape with Pavilion Screens by Yuan Jiang and Wang Yun, 1720

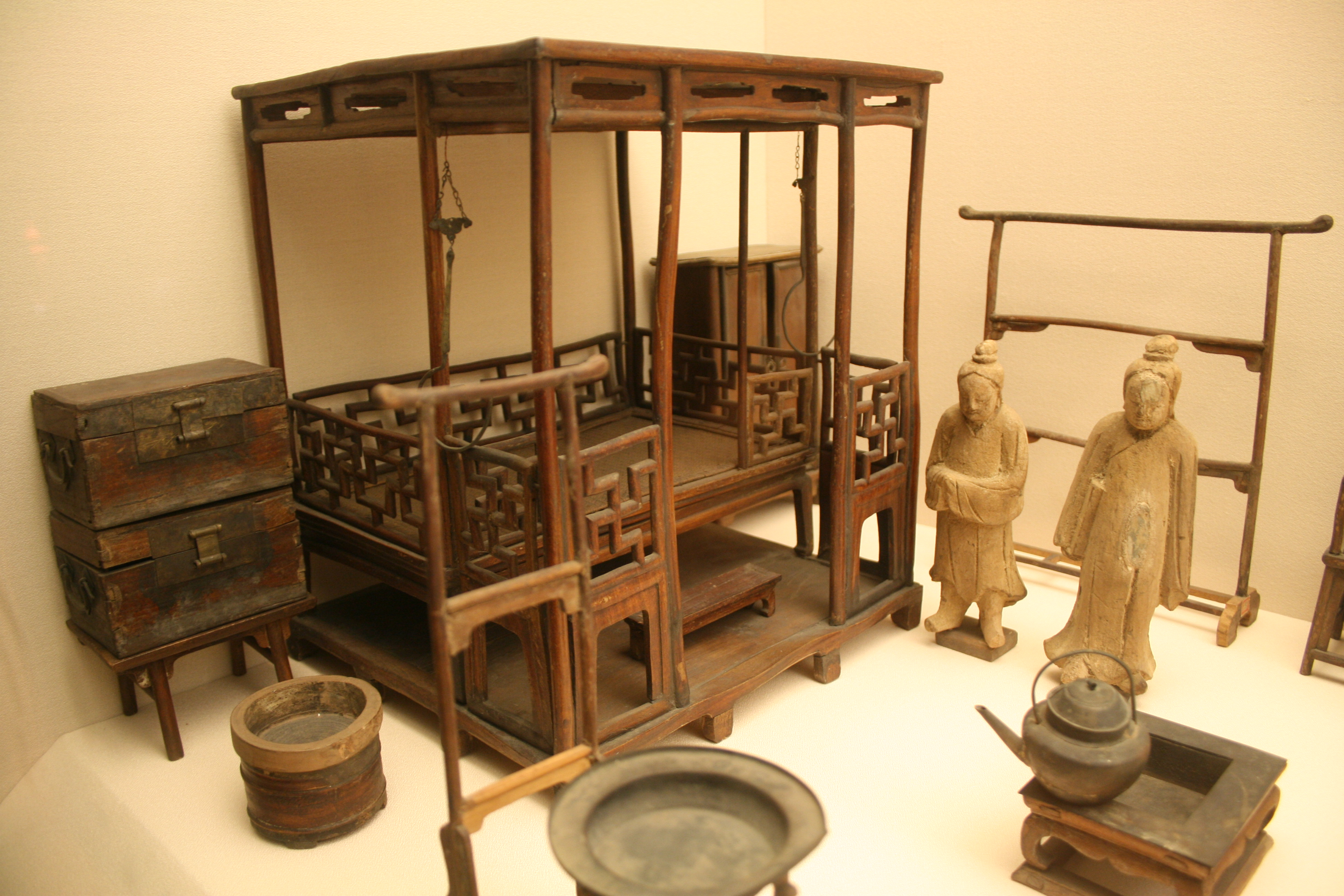
Ming Furniture Models from Tomb of Pan Yongcheng

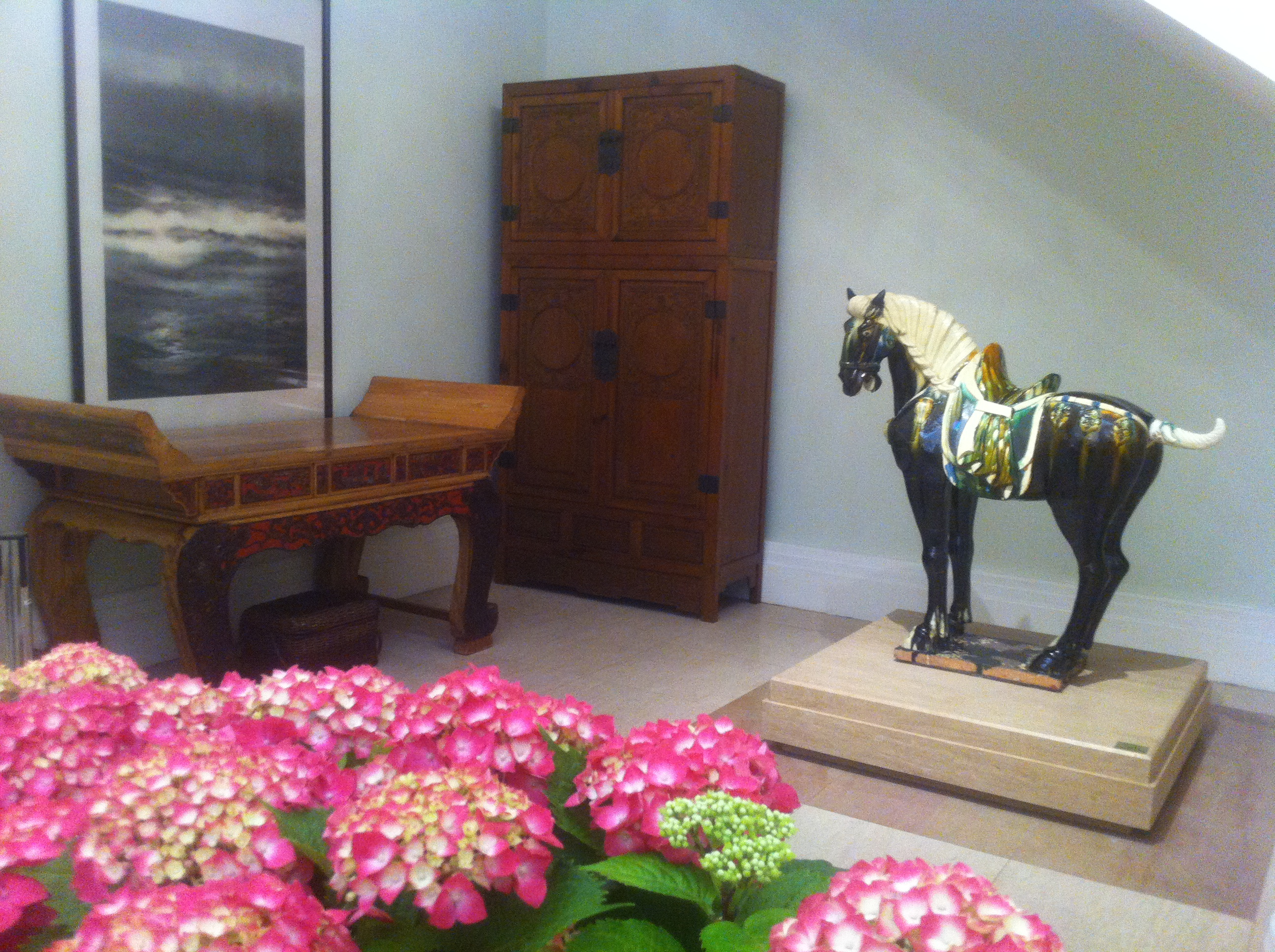
HK Central Government House Open Day interior furniture Horse in art

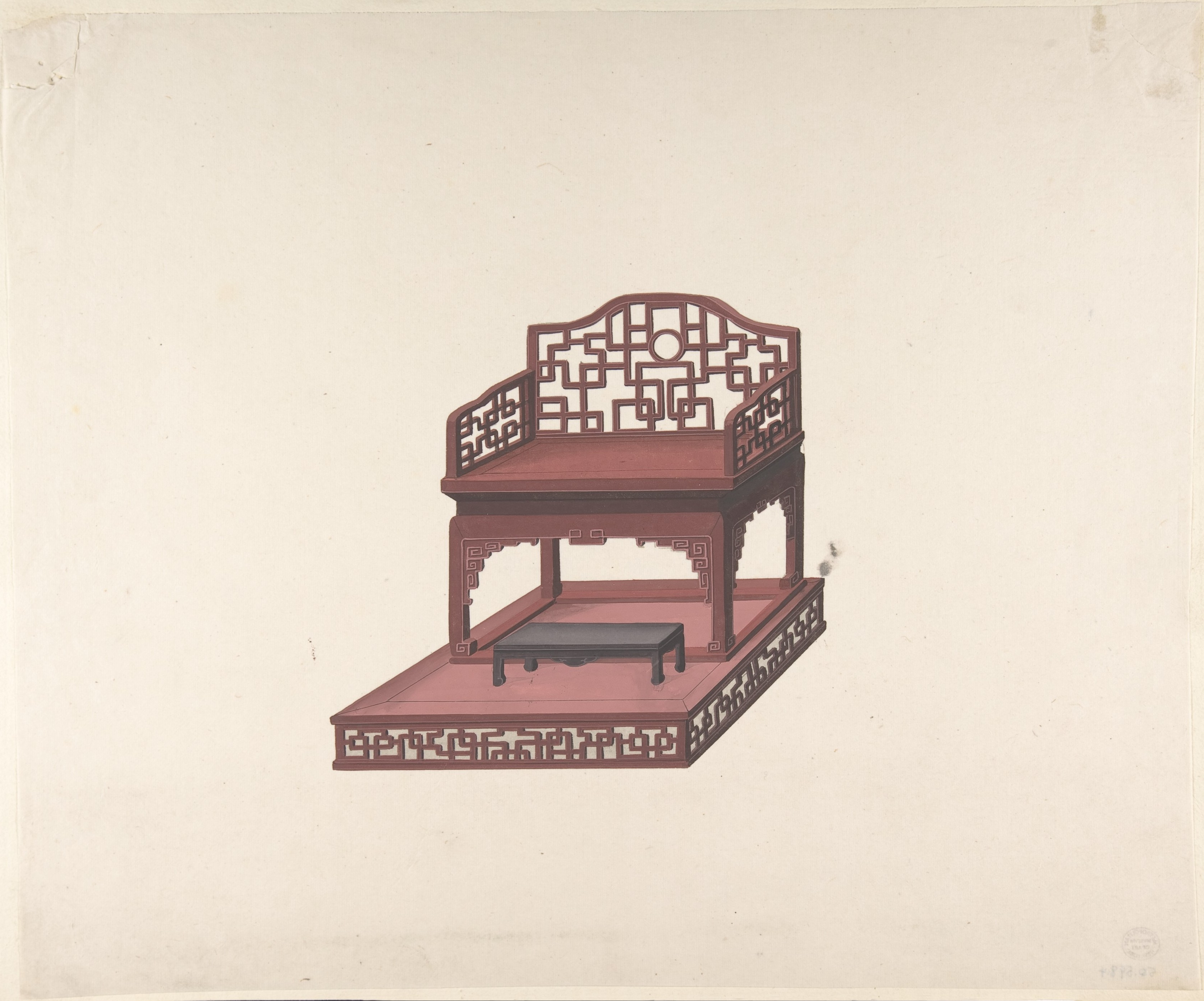
Chinese traditional chair.

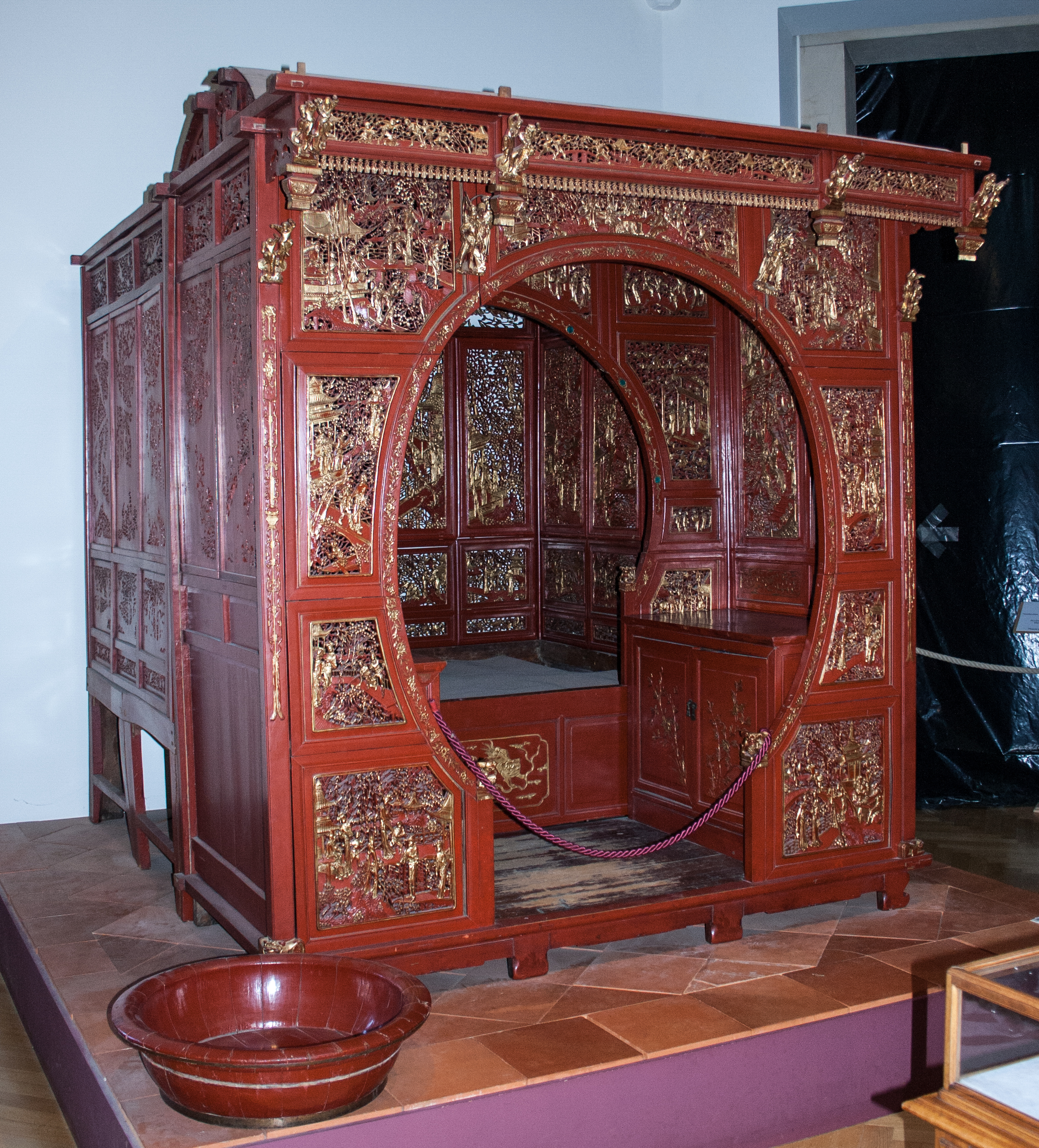
Chinese traditional bed, 19th century

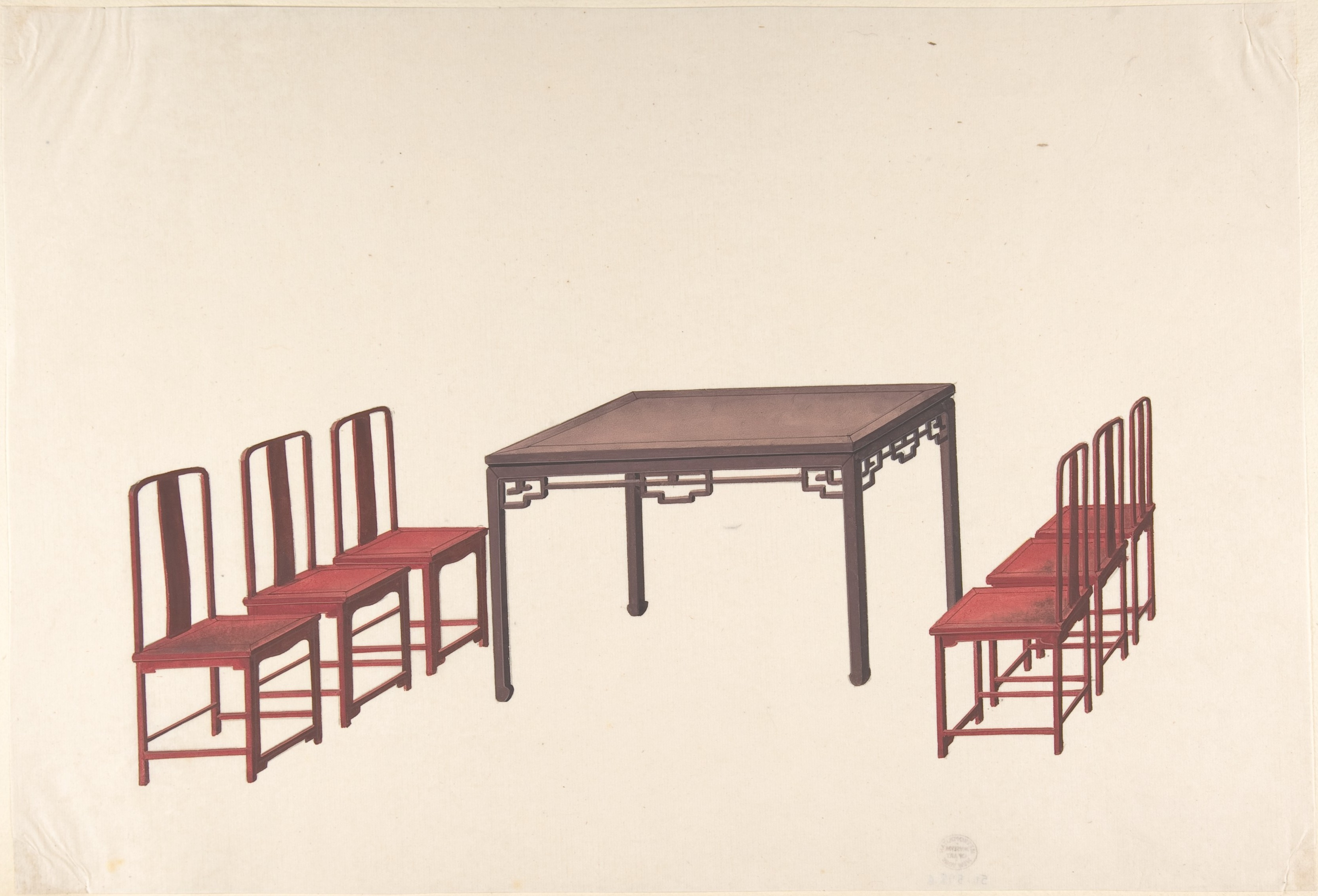
Traditional chairs and tables.

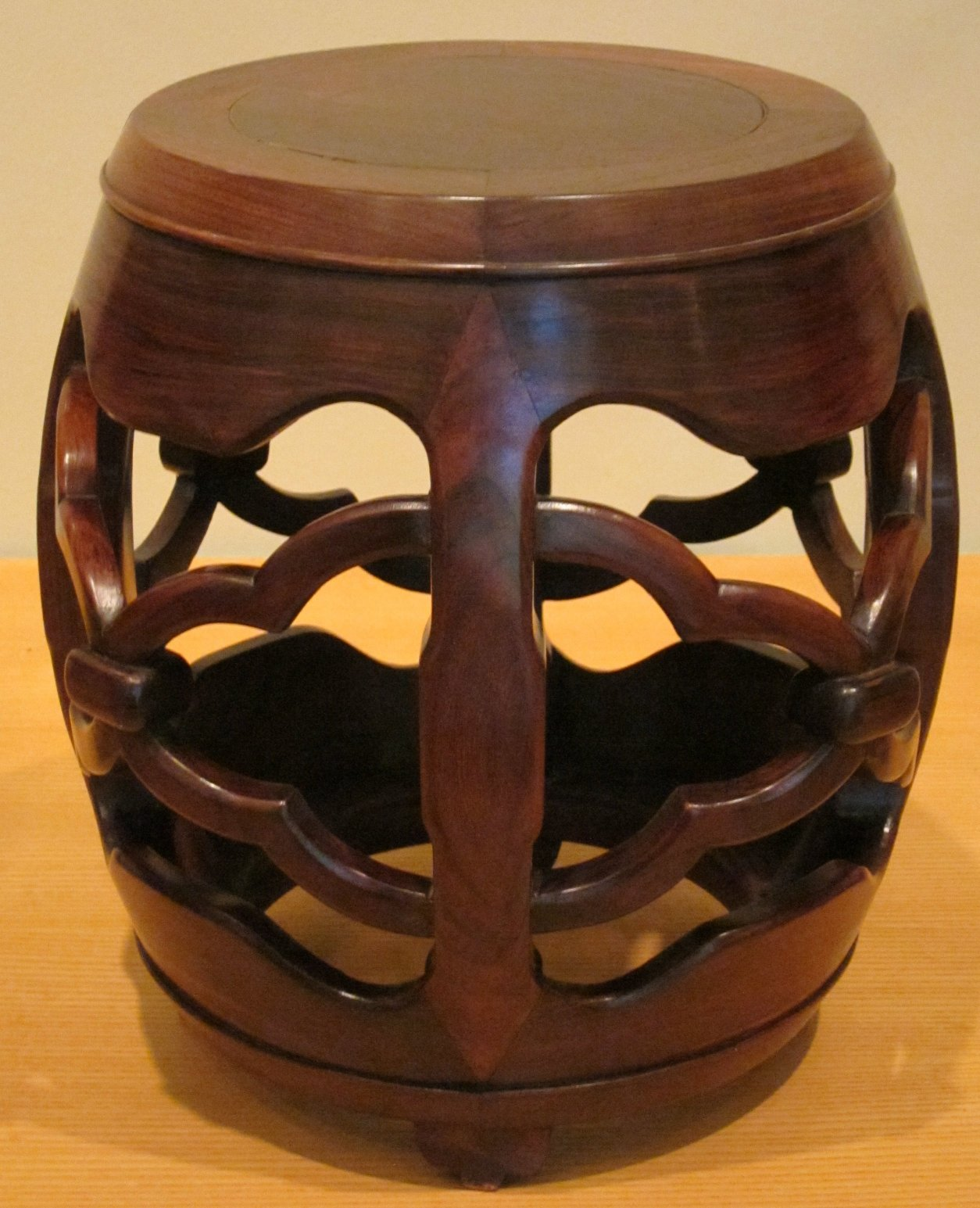
Chinese garden seat, Qing dynasty, mid 19th century, red wood

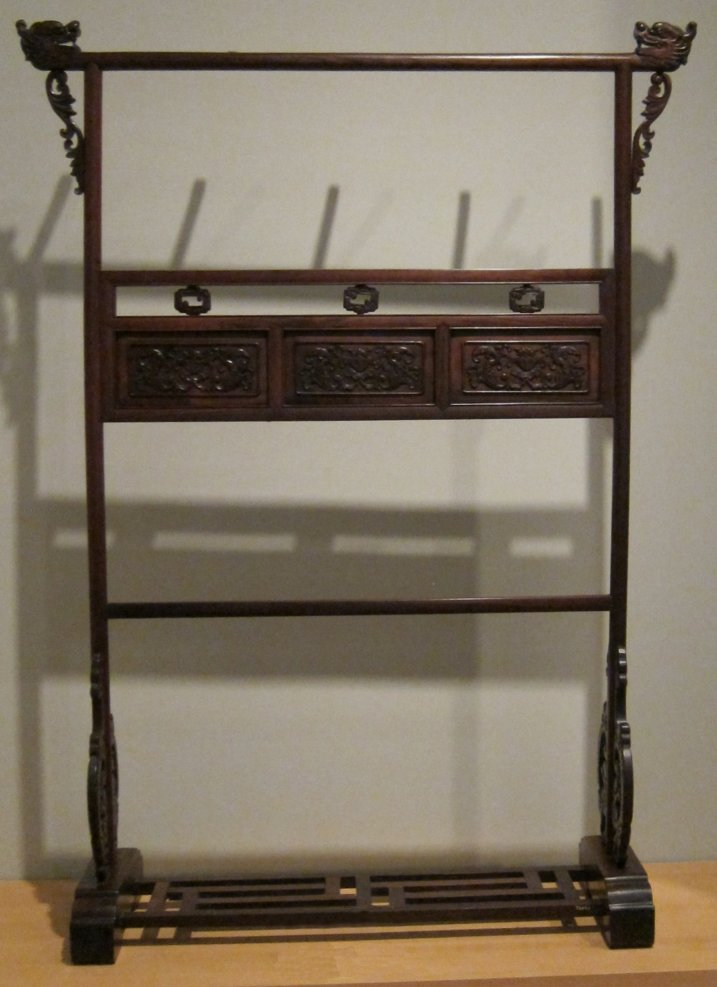
Chinese clothes rack, Qing dynasty, dated 1823, hongmu wood, Honolulu Academy of Arts

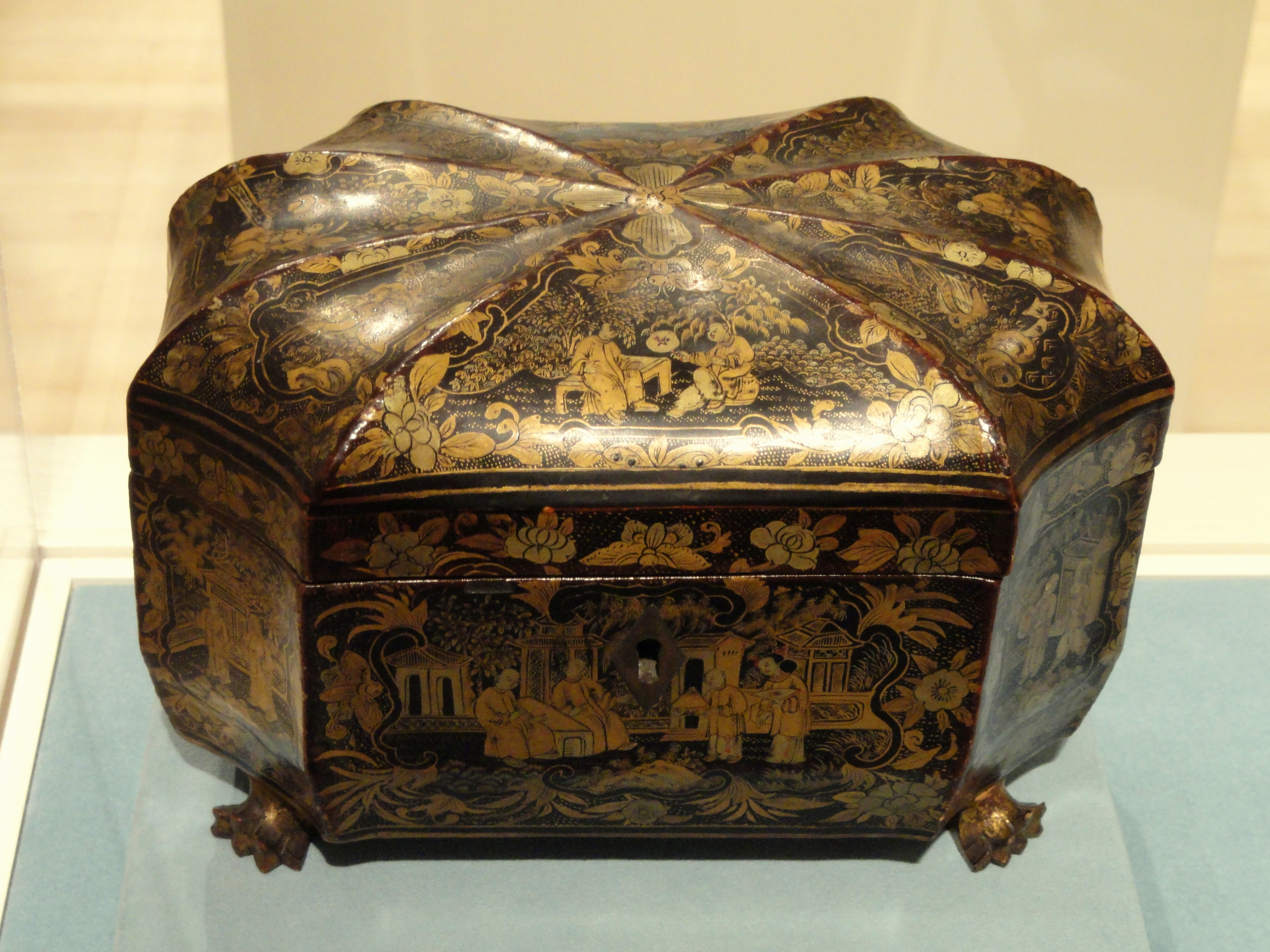
Tea caddy, Chinese - Indianapolis Museum of Art

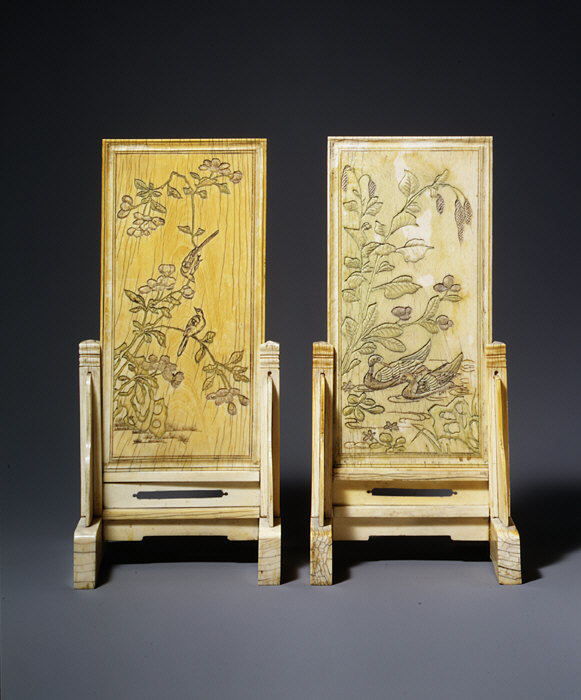
Pair of Table Screens with Flowers and Birds

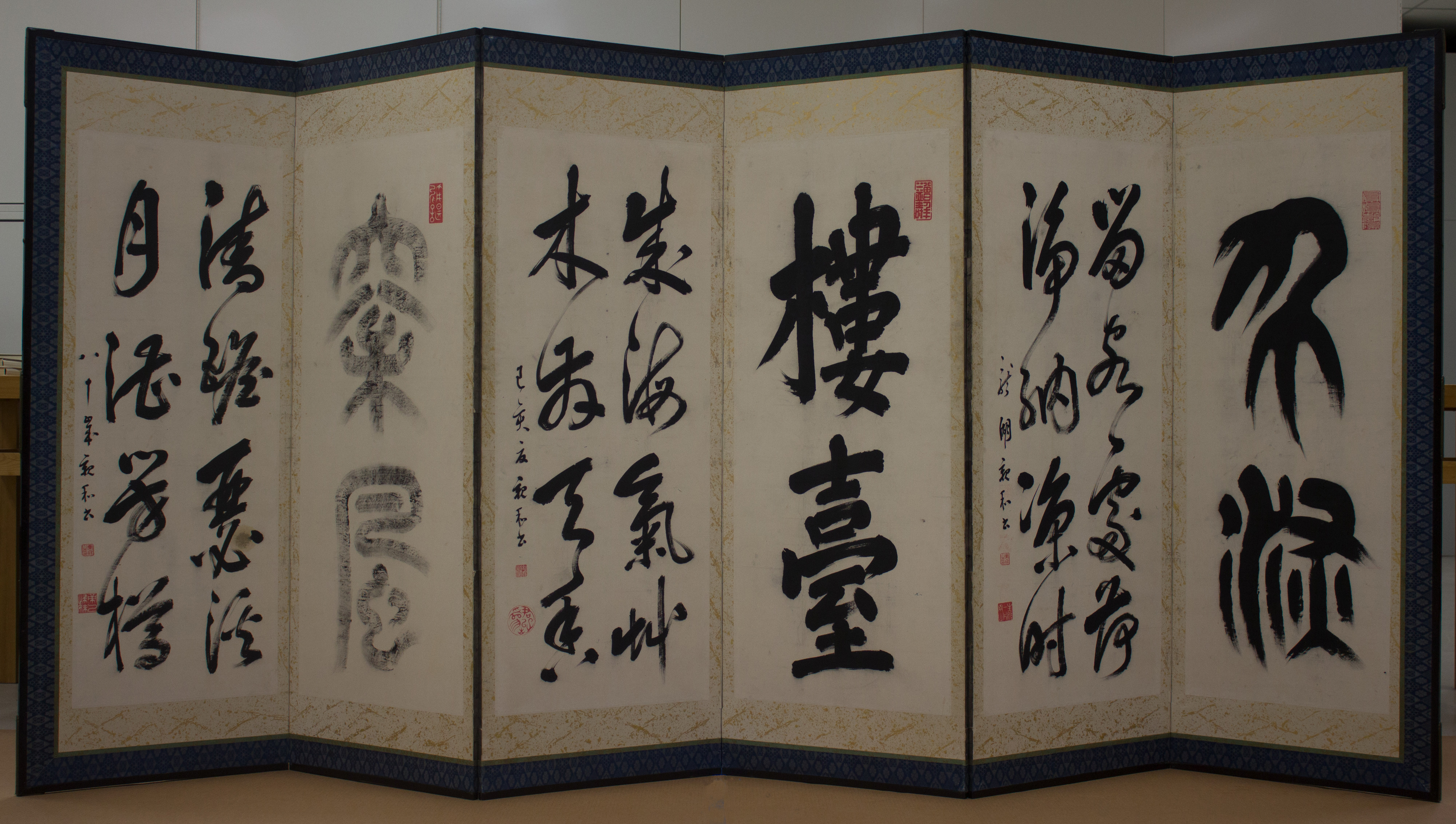
Chinese Poems and Calligraphy screen

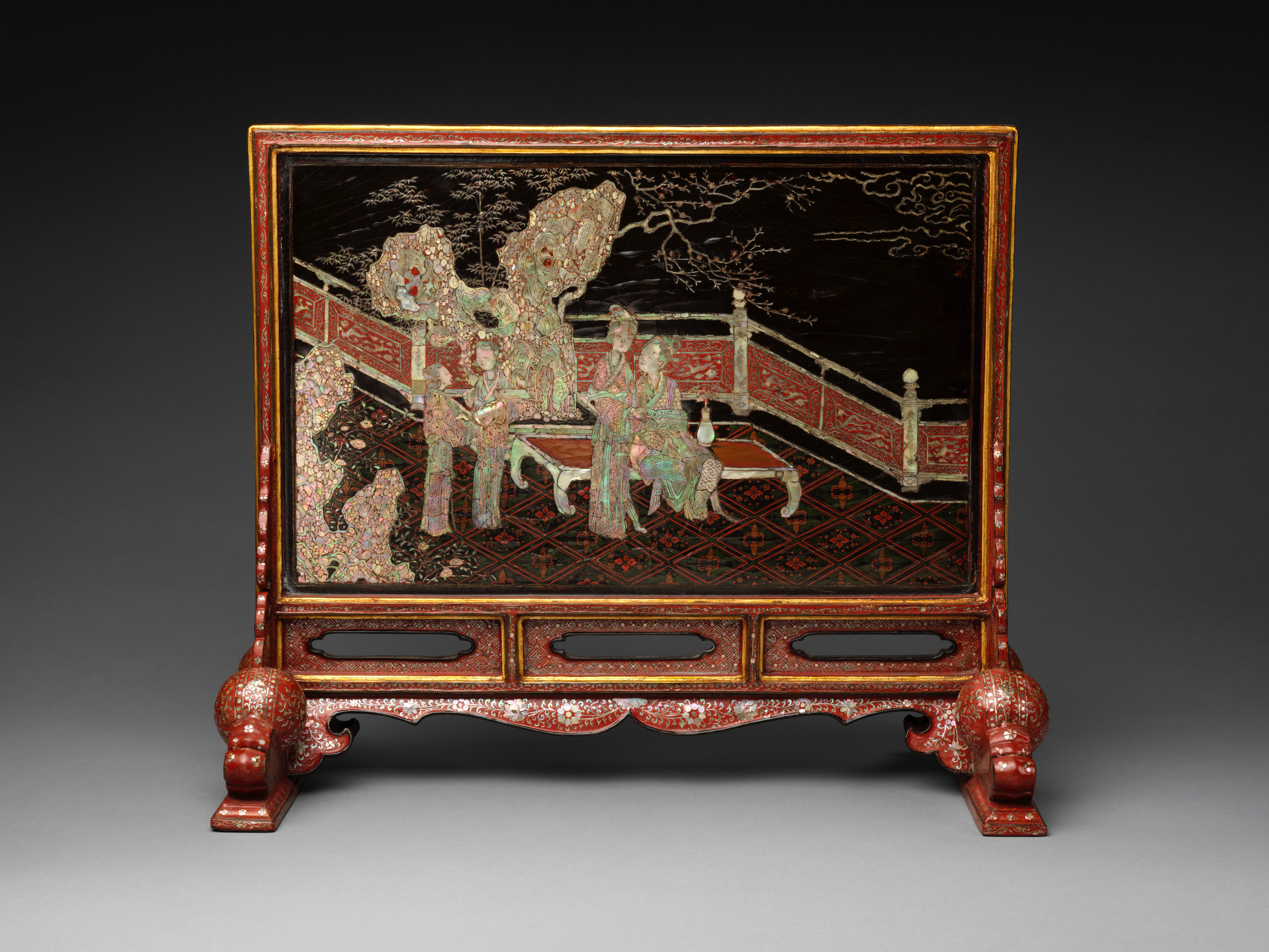
Late Ming dynasty table screen

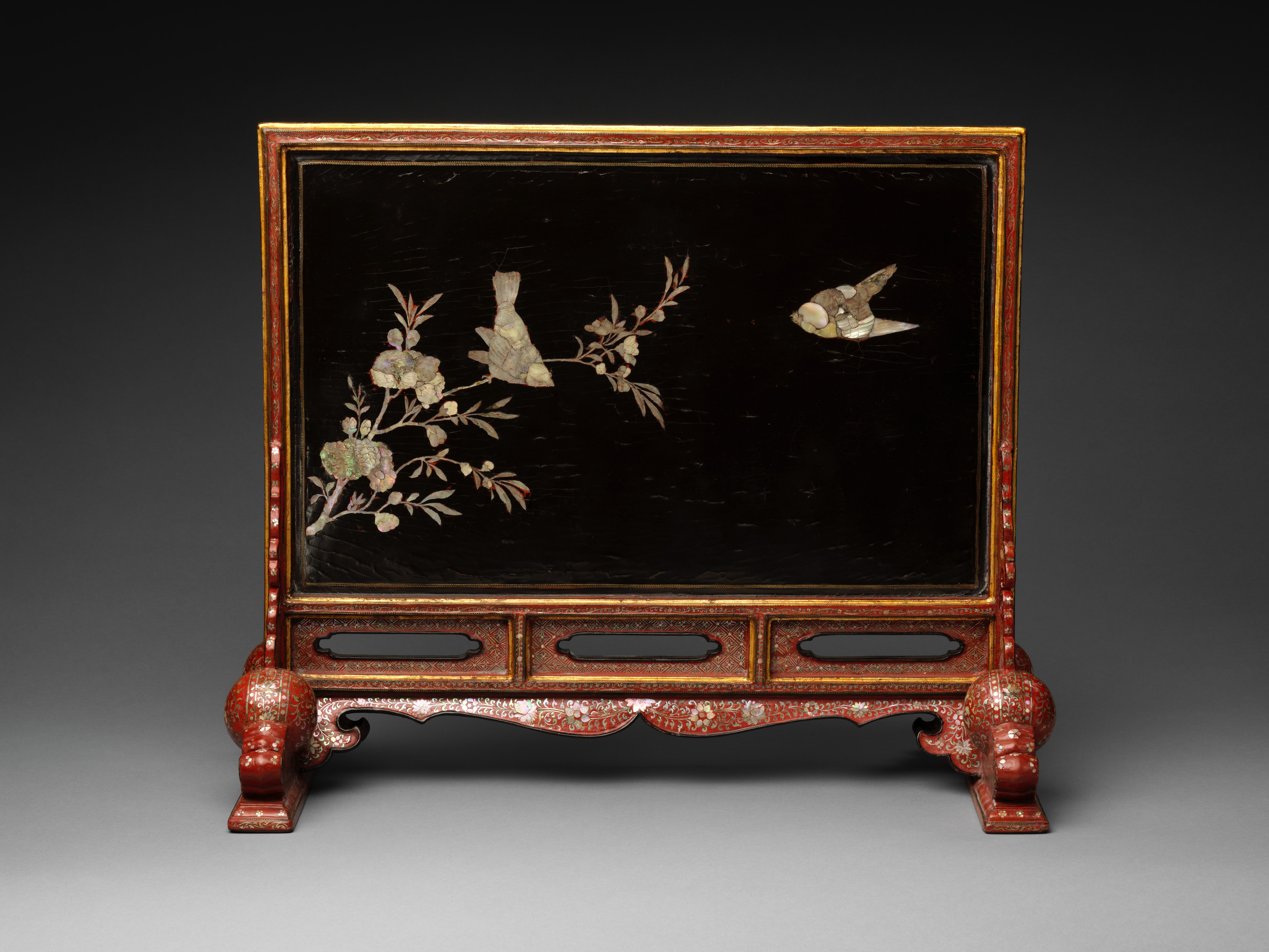
Late Ming dynasty table screen

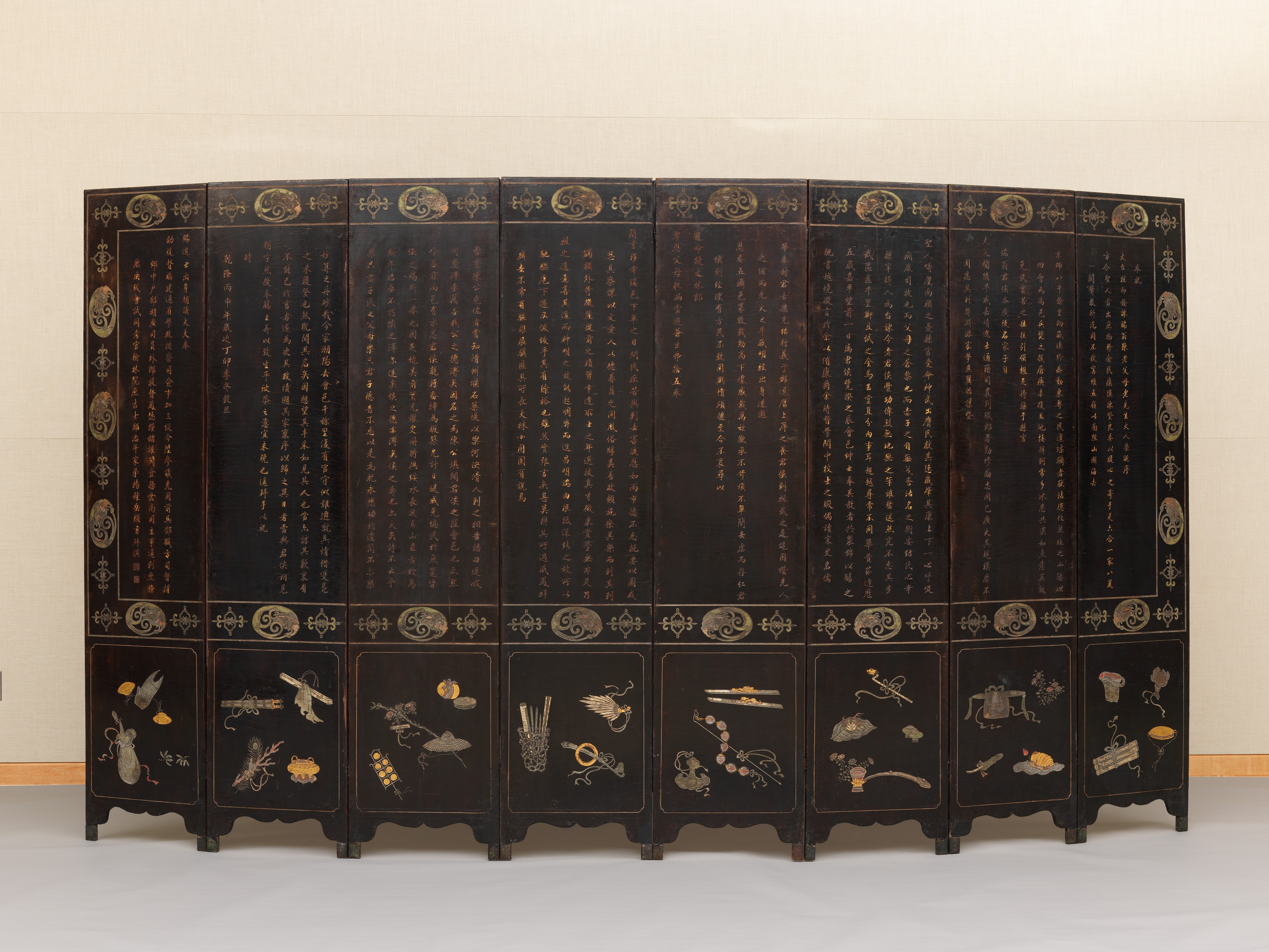
Chinese screen with birthday celebration for General Guo Ziyi

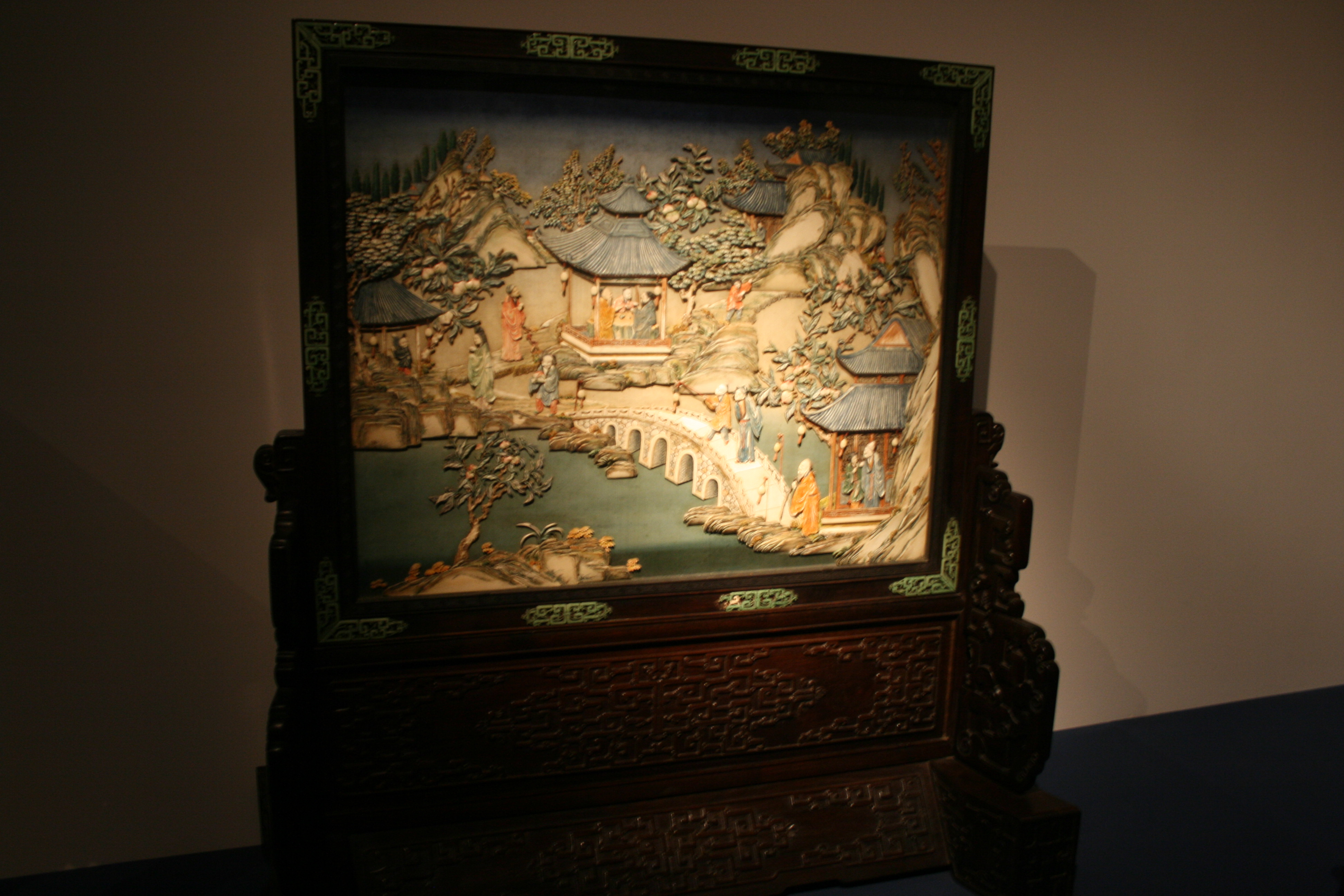
Qing Screen Set on a Stand

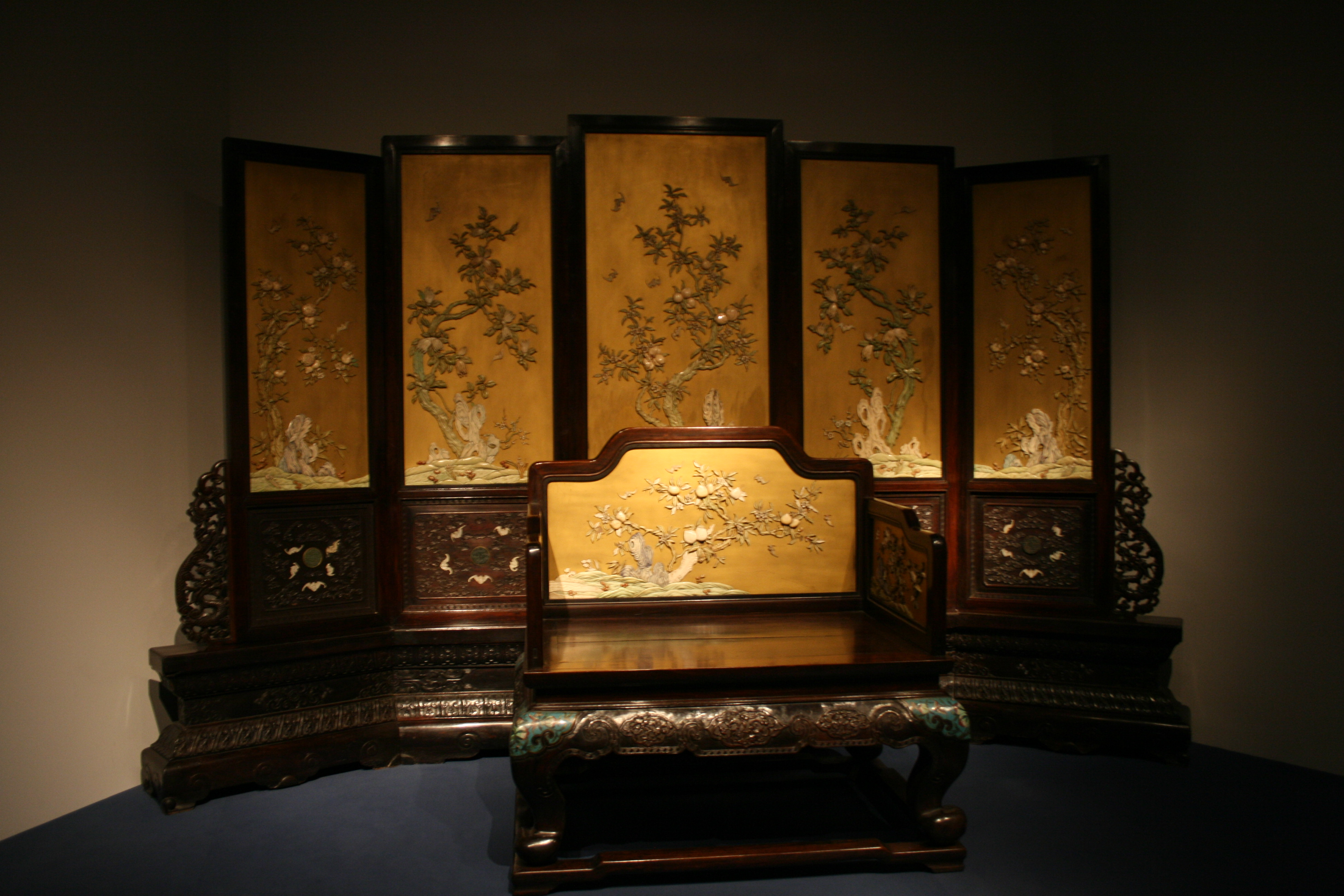
Qing Screen Set and Chair with Ivory Inlay

== See also ==
- Gustav Ecke
- Woodworking in Ancient China
