= Tongxinluo =

Traditional Chinese medicine formulation

Tongxinluo is a traditional Chinese medicine formulation used for the treatment of cardiovascular and cerebrovascular diseases. Consisting of a combination of medicinal herbs and animal-derived substances, it is manufactured in capsule form and has been widely used in China and several other Asian countries since the 1990s.

The formulation of tongxinluo includes both plant and animal ingredients. Documented components include the roots of ginseng and peony, Borneolum syntheticum, Santalum album, Dalbergia odorifera, Boswellia sacra, jujube, and Cinnamomum officinarum, alongside animal-derived elements such as scorpion, leech, cockroach, centipede, and cicada shell. This combination reflects the traditional Chinese medicinal rationale of using multi-component therapies to achieve synergistic effects.

Pharmacologically, tongxinluo is reported to exhibit vasodilatory, antiplatelet, anticoagulant, thrombolytic, and lipid-lowering effects. Studies attribute its cardioprotective properties to mechanisms involving improved endothelial function, anti-inflammatory and antioxidant activity, inhibition of apoptosis, regulation of autophagy, anti-fibrotic effects, stimulation of angiogenesis, and modulation of exosome-mediated signaling. The formulation is also thought to strengthen myocardial contractility, reduce blood viscosity, and prevent thrombosis.
