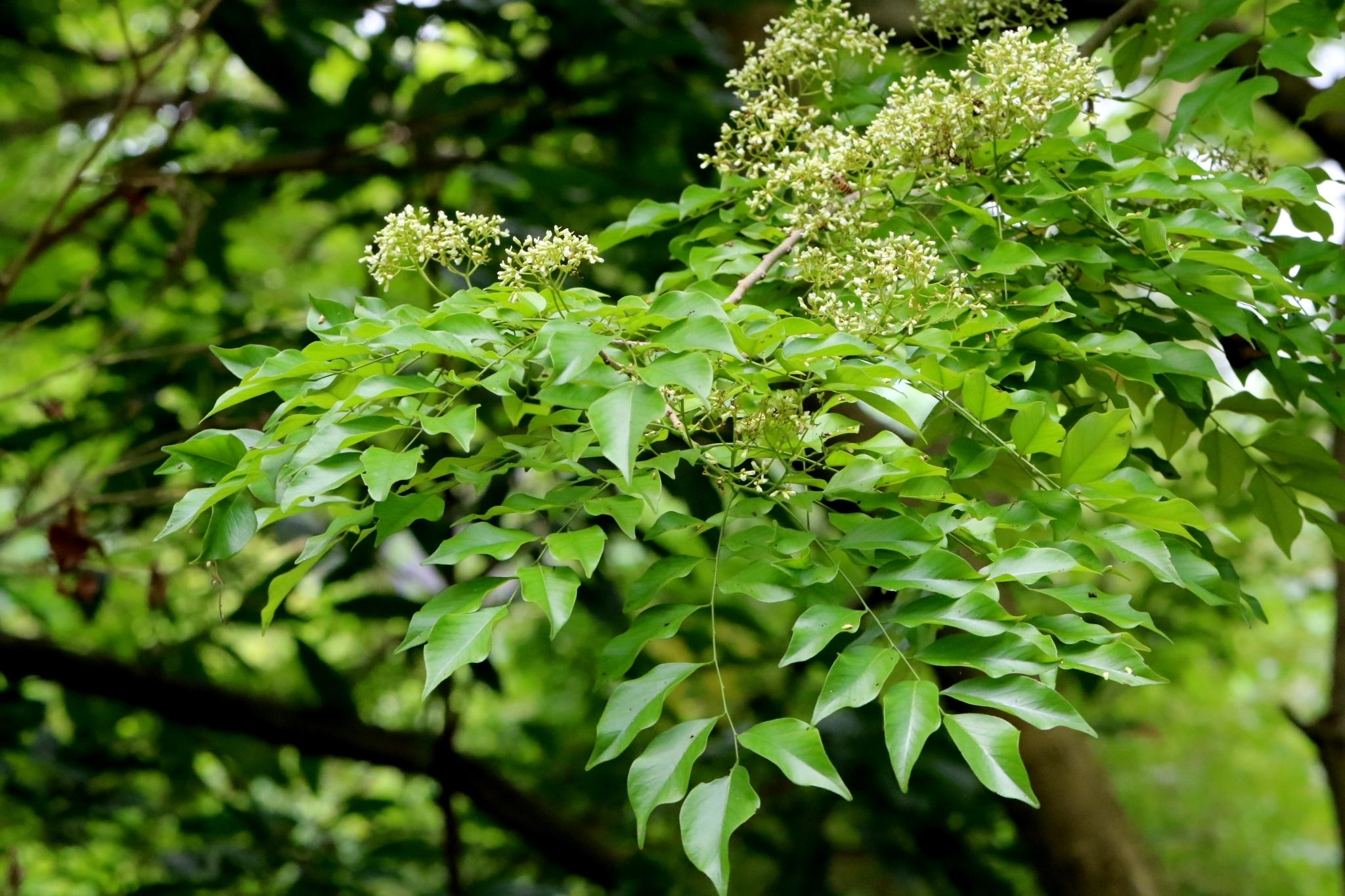

Conservation status
- Vulnerable (IUCN 2.3)

Scientific classification
- Kingdom: Plantae
- Clade: Tracheophytes
- Clade: Angiosperms
- Clade: Eudicots
- Clade: Rosids
- Order: Fabales
- Family: Fabaceae
- Subfamily: Faboideae
- Genus: Dalbergia
- Species: D. odorifera

Binomial name
- Dalbergia odorifera T. Chen

Synonyms
- Dalbergia hainanensis misapplied

= Dalbergia odorifera =

Species of legume

Dalbergia odorifera, fragrant rosewood or Chinese rosewood, is a species of true rosewood in the genus Dalbergia. It is a small or medium-sized tree, 10–15 metres (33–49 ft) tall. It is endemic to China and occurs in Fujian, Hainan, Zhejiang, and Guangdong.

== Description ==
A deciduous tree, D. odorifera will start shedding leaves at around December of each year in the Northern Hemisphere. It becomes dormant throughout the winter months.

== Threats ==
It was overexploited in the twentieth century and was classed as a vulnerable species in 1998. This reached a level in the early twenty-first century where most trees of a size for commercial use had been cut down. As a consequence, other species of Dalbergia started to be exploited in its place.

== Uses ==
It is used as a wood product and in folk medicine. This valuable wood was used in Chinese furniture from the late Ming and early Qing dynasties, and new furniture in the same styles are sought after as luxury and prestige items.

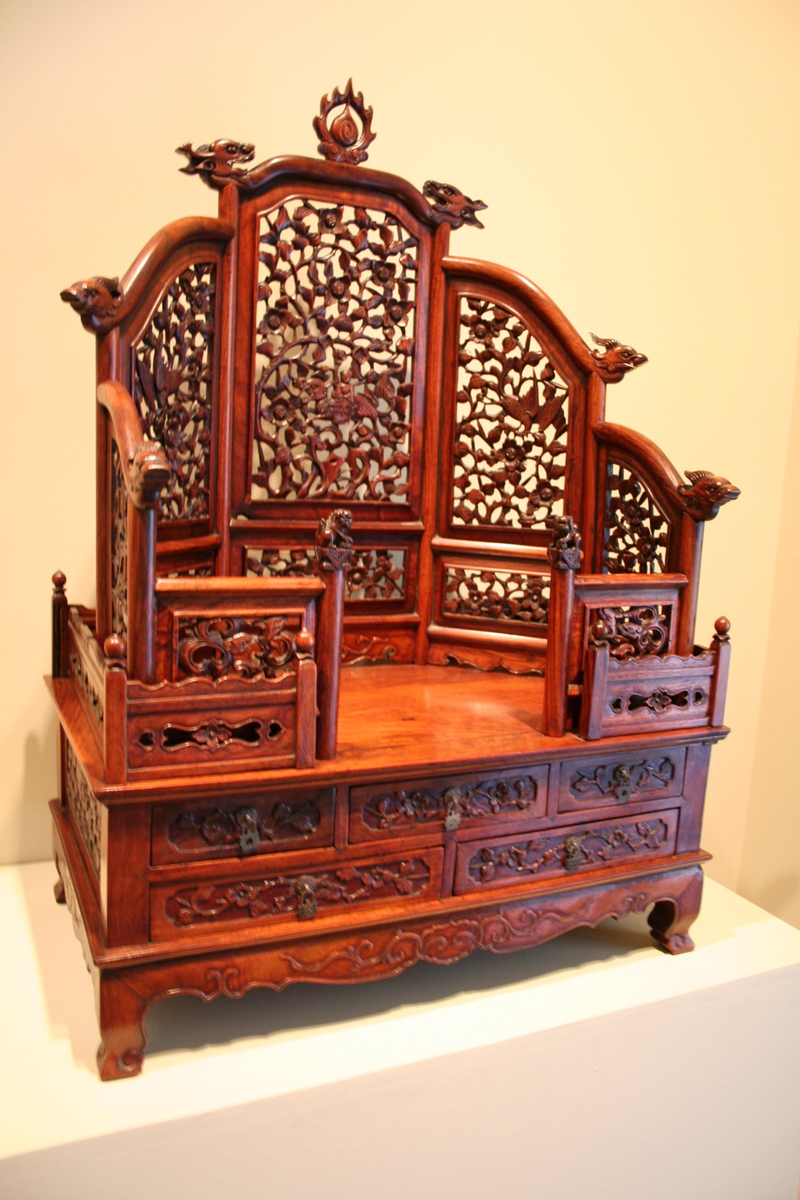
Chinese dressing cabinet made from Huanghuali wood, Qing Dynasty (17th-18th century)

Four compounds isolated from the root of this plant have been shown in a laboratory to have antioxidant properties.
