= Pterocarpus cambodianus =

Pterocarpus cambodianus is a taxonomic synonym of Pterocarpus macrocarpus that may refer to:

- Pterocarpus cambodianus (Pierre) Gagnep.
- Pterocarpus cambodianus Pierre
