= Pterocarpus pedatus =

Pterocarpus pedatus is a taxonomic synonym of Pterocarpus macrocarpus that may refer to:

- Pterocarpus pedatus (Pierre) Gagnep.
- Pterocarpus pedatus Pierre
