= Moulsford =

Village in Oxfordshire, England

Coordinates: 51.551°N 1.145°W

Moulsford-on-Thames
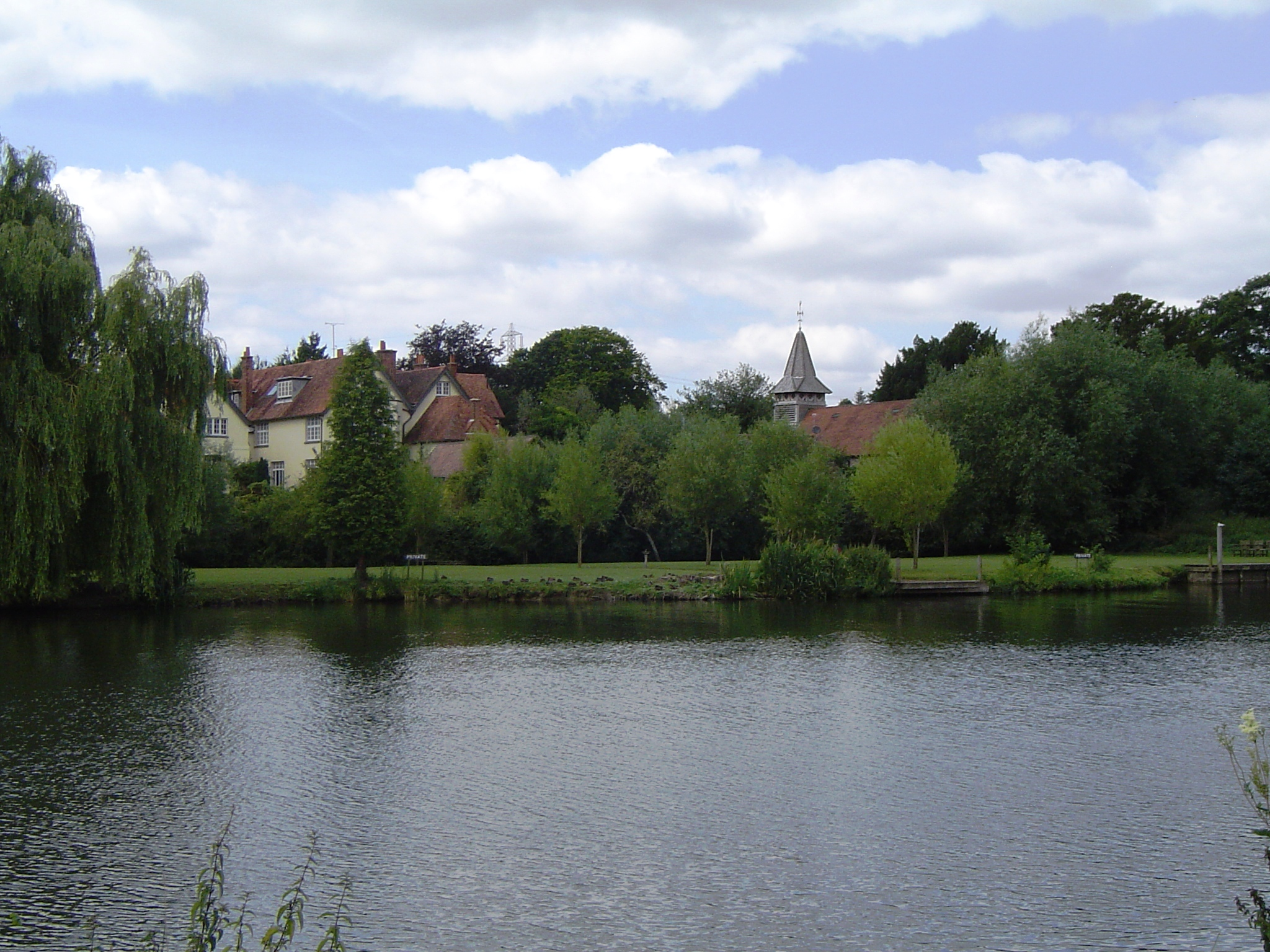
- Moulsford from the River Thames

- Location within Oxfordshire
- Area: 7.24 km^{2} (2.80 sq mi)
- Population: 526 (2001 census)
  - Density: 73/km^{2} (190/sq mi)
- OS grid reference: SU585835
- Civil parish: Moulsford
- District: South Oxfordshire
- Shire county: Oxfordshire
- Region: South East
- Country: England
- Sovereign state: United Kingdom
- Post town: Wallingford
- Postcode district: OX10
- Dialling code: 01491
- Police: Thames Valley
- Fire: Oxfordshire
- Ambulance: South Central
- UK Parliament: Didcot and Wantage
- Website: Moulsford Village Website

Moulsford is a village and civil parish in South Oxfordshire. Before 1974, it was in the county of Berkshire, in Wallingford Rural District, but following the Berkshire boundary changes of that year it became a part of Oxfordshire. Moulsford is on the A329, by the River Thames, just north of Streatley and south of Wallingford. The west of the parish is taken up by the foothills of the Berkshire Downs, including the Moulsford Downs. Moulsford Bottom and Kingstanding Hill are traditionally associated with King Alfred and the Battle of Ashdown.

Moulsford Manor was the principal home of the prominent Carew family, who also lived at Carew Castle in Pembrokeshire. It was used by the American Army Air-Force during World War Two, then a nursing school, before being bought as a private residence for Kevin Maxwell in 1994, who lets it out for the filming of Midsomer Murders. Moulsford Railway Bridge, situated just north of the village on the Great Western Main Line, was designed by Isambard Kingdom Brunel.

== History ==
The Bronze Age 'Moulsford Torc' was discovered in the parish and bought by the Museum of Reading with the aid of a grant from the Art Fund in 1961. It is a hoop-shaped decorative neck ornament, made of four spirally twisted gold-alloy strips held together by a delicate piece of twisted gold wire.

Evidence of later prehistoric and Roman activity has been identified in the surrounding area, reflecting the long-standing importance of the River Thames as a route for communication and trade. The parish’s position near a natural crossing of the Thames, close to Streatley and Goring-on-Thames, is likely to have encouraged early settlement.

Moulsford is recorded in the Domesday Book of 1086 as a small agricultural settlement held by a Norman tenant-in-chief. The place-name is generally taken to derive from Old English, possibly meaning “Mūla’s ford”, indicating a river crossing associated with an individual or family. During the medieval period the village formed part of a predominantly agrarian landscape, with open-field farming and meadowland along the Thames floodplain.

A ferry crossing operated at Moulsford from at least the medieval period, providing a link across the River Thames to the Berkshire bank. The ferry remained in use until 1967, when it was closed following the decline in demand and the availability of nearby road bridges.

In the post-medieval period, Moulsford remained a small rural community. The river continued to shape local life, both as a transport route and through periodic flooding of low-lying land. A major change came with the construction of Moulsford Railway Bridge in the 1830s as part of the Great Western Railway. The bridge, designed under the direction of Isambard Kingdom Brunel, improved connections with Reading and Oxford.

During the 19th and early 20th centuries the village developed modestly while retaining its rural character. The Thames became increasingly associated with leisure activities, particularly rowing.

The village’s educational provision expanded in the 20th century with the establishment of Cranford House School, an independent day and boarding school for girls, founded in 1931 and later relocated to Moulsford. The school occupies a substantial riverside site and has become a notable local institution, contributing to the social and economic life of the parish.

In the later 20th and early 21st centuries, Moulsford has experienced limited residential growth while preserving its historic setting, with much of the surrounding countryside included within the North Wessex Downs National Landscape.

== Moulsford Manor ==
Moulsford Manor, next to the parish church, was from the Middle Ages until 1497 the principal home of the prominent Carew family, who also lived at Carew Castle in Pembrokeshire. The house is largely Edwardian, built around a Tudor core. It was a private residence until 1929 when it was used first as a hotel, and then by the American Air Force during World War II. Post-war it became a nursing school and was restored as a private home in 1994, when it was purchased for Kevin Maxwell's wife by her parents in 1994; they let it out for the filming of Midsomer Murders.

== Parish church ==
Moulsford parish church began as a chapelry of Cholsey. The first known record of the chapel dates from between 1220 and 1227. The botanist and geologist John Stevens Henslow was its vicar in the 1830s. In 1846, most of the medieval church was demolished and the current Church of England parish church of Saint John the Baptist, designed by Sir George Gilbert Scott, was built on its foundations. Scott's Gothic Revival building retains the west wall of the original church, which includes a 13th-century Early English Gothic lancet window, and the timber frame of the bellcote.

== Other notable buildings ==
- Moulsford Railway Bridge, situated just north of the village on the Great Western Main Line, designed by Isambard Kingdom Brunel and built in 1838–39.
- Fair Mile Hospital, a former lunatic asylum at Moulsford from 1870 to 2003, originally named the Moulsford Asylum.
- The Beetle and Wedge a former public house, east of the village centre on the River Thames, on the site of a former ferry crossing.
- Sphinx Hill, a Grade II* listed Egyptian-style house on the Thames designed by John Outram

== Gallery ==
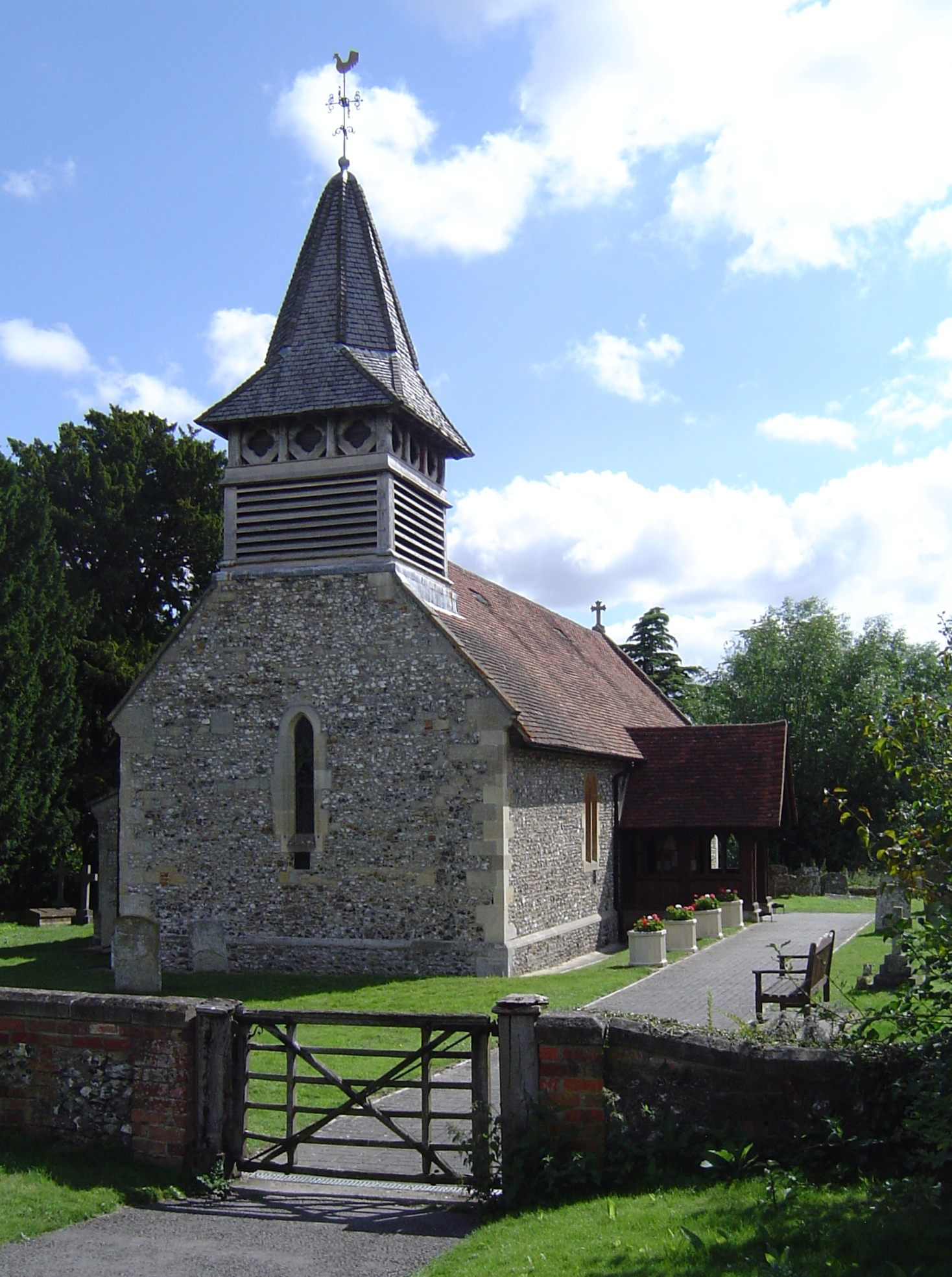
St John the Baptist parish church, Moulsford

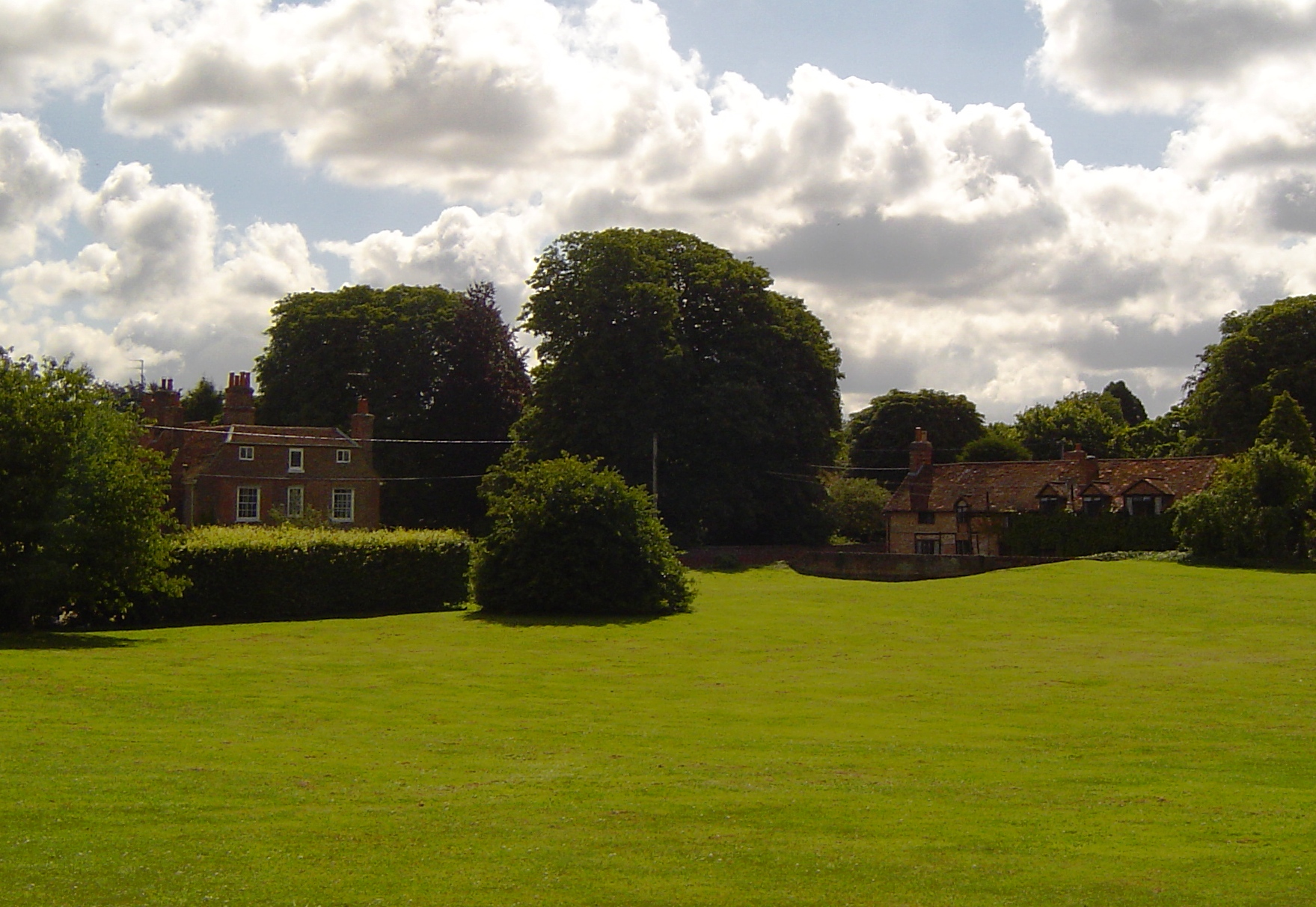
Moulsford Green and recreation ground

== Sources ==
- Page, W.H.; Ditchfield, P.H., eds. (1923). A History of the County of Berkshire. Victoria County History. Vol. 3. assisted by John Hautenville Cope. London: The St Katherine Press. pp. 504–507.
- Pevsner, Nikolaus (1966). The Buildings of England: Berkshire. Harmondsworth: Penguin Books. p. 179.
