= Wadhurst Park =

Grade I-listed estate in Wadhurst, East Sussex

Coordinates: 51.0354°N 0.3271°E

Deer Troughs at Wadhurst Park Estate

Wadhurst Park is a landed estate located in Wadhurst, East Sussex. It is owned by the Rausing family.

The estate is 796 hectares and includes a deer park of 141 hectares.

== History ==
The original house, Wadhurst Hall, was built in 1870–1884 by Edward Tarver for the Murrieta family from Spain and incorporated a small 18th century villa. It was bought by Julius Drewe at the end of the 19th century. Following the Drewe family's move to newly constructed Castle Drogo, in 1928 it was bought by Grant MacLean, a solicitor. He changed the name to Wadhurst Park and built a golf course by the lake.

During the Second World War it was used to house troops and later as a prisoner of war camp. The house was demolished in 1952.

The estate was purchased by Hans Rausing in 1975. Rausing employed Anthony du Gard Pasley to landscape the grounds. The New House was designed by architect John Outram in 1978–1981 and built from 1982 to 1986. It is Grade I listed.
