= Sphinx Hill, Oxfordshire =

House in Oxfordshire, England

Sphinx Hill
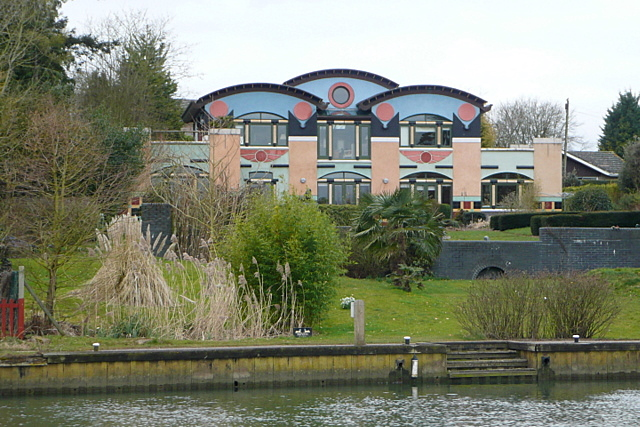
- The house in 2010 viewed from across the Thames.
- Interactive map of the Sphinx Hill area
- Alternative names: Egyptian House

General information
- Architectural style: Egyptian Revival; Postmodernist
- Location: Ferry Lane, Moulsford, England
- Coordinates: 51.54751°N 1.14587°W
- Completed: 1999

Technical details
- Floor count: 2

Design and construction
- Architect: John Outram

Listed Building – Grade II*
- Official name: Sphinx Hill, its surrounding hard landscaping, terraces and water feature
- Designated: 20 June 2024
- Reference no.: 1485669

Sphinx Hill, also known as the Egyptian House, is a Grade II* listed house in Moulsford, Oxfordshire, England. Designed by John Outram, the Egyptian-style postmodernist house was completed in 1999, making it the youngest listed building in the United Kingdom.

== Architecture ==
The house sits alongside older houses, such as Victorian and Edwardian villas, and stands out from its neighbours with its polychromatic Egyptian-style exterior. The symmetrical two-storey structure has barrel-vaulted roofs reminiscent of the funerary complex of Djoser in Saqqara and is crowned by an attic storey which resembles a giant Eye of Horus. The exterior features columns with tartan pattern tiling along the base and black capitals topped with terracotta circles, representing the hieroglyph for the rising sun.

The property's garden was designed to symbolise the course of the Nile and features a rill in its centre which flows down three pools from a fountain.

== History ==
In 1994, Henrietta McCall, an Egyptologist, and her husband, Christopher, approached John Outram Associates as they were admirers of Outram's first domestic work, the Grade I listed New House in Wadhurst, East Sussex. They wanted a house which would reflect their shared interest in Ancient Egypt and hoped for a plot near a river to fit the Egyptianate theme. The riverside site in Moulsford, situated on the banks of the Thames, was found after a difficult search and was occupied by an existing 1960s house. Permission for the previous building's replacement was obtained in 1997, with the house's construction starting in Spring 1998 and completion a year later in Spring 1999.

The property was sold in December 2022 for £2.3 million, which led to the Twentieth Century Society (C20) applying for the building to be listed to restrict any "unsympathetic alteration or demolition" to the house. The building and its surroundings were Grade II* listed on 20 June 2024, making it the fifth listed building designed by Outram. It also became the youngest listed building in the country, having been completed only 25 years prior, beating Colin St John Wilson and MJ Long's British Library, which was opened a year earlier. Following the successful application, C20 said it was "exceedingly rare" for a building under the age of 30 years old to be granted listed status, which reflected its "national significance". Historic England described the house as a "tour-de-force of domestic Post-Modernism".
