= Isle of Dogs Pumping Station =

Storm water pumping station in London

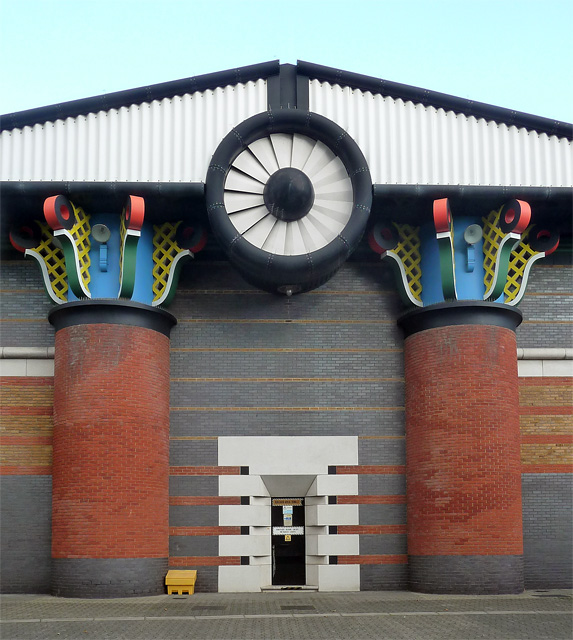
- The building in 2015
- Interactive map of Isle of Dogs Pumping Station
- Location: Cubitt Town, Isle of Dogs, London
- Coordinates: 51°29′58″N 0°00′29″W
- OS grid reference: TQ3836779700
- Built: 1986–1988
- Architect: John Outram

Listed Building – Grade II*
- Designated: 19 June 2017
- Reference no.: 1447069

The Isle of Dogs Pumping Station, nicknamed the Temple of Storms, is a pumping station located in Cubitt Town on the Isle of Dogs, London. It was designed by John Outram under commission from Edward Hollamby of the London Docklands Development Corporation and completed in 1988. It removes excess rainwater collected on the development's Enterprise Zone and overflow from the nearby Manchester Road sewers. The station was granted grade II* heritage status by Historic England in 2017 during a campaign for greater representation of post-modern architecture on the register.

== History ==
The pumping station was one of three commissioned by head architect Edward Hollamby of the London Docklands Development Corporation (LDDC), as part of their east London redevelopment project. The stations were necessary to clear excess rainwater collected from the development's new streets, with the Isle of Dogs station responsible for the Enterprise Zone and sewer overflow from Manchester Road. Margaret Thatcher wanted the state to fund utilities, thus assigning responsibility for underground structures to the government and overground buildings to the LDDC. Being an overground utility building, the pumping stations fell under the remit of the LDDC. In defiance of Thatcher, Hollamby commissioned three architects to make the buildings as visually appealing as possible.

John Outram was tasked with building the Isle of Dogs station, with Richard Roberts and Nicholas Grimshaw responsible for the remaining two in Canning Town and North Woolwich respectively. He was given £100,000 for design and construction of the station. Engineers oversaw the interior systems of the station, and Outram designed the exterior elements. Building work began in 1986 and was completed in 1988.

== Architecture ==
The pumping station is an example of post-modern architecture. The entrance of the building is flanked by two decorated columns. A large extraction fan lies at the centre of the building. Engineers suggested a smaller fan could be utilized for ventilation with the larger one placed in front for decoration; Outram rejected this suggestion because he wanted it to have a use. The design contains iconography incorporating references to a phoenix, the River Thames and other natural imagery.

The station houses 12 submersible pumps which provide a maximum capacity of 25 cubic metres (880 cu ft) of water per second. It operates autonomously using level sensors and is connected to a Thames Water control centre. Water first passes through a raked bar screen to remove debris, is passed through the station's pumps and subsequently discharged into the Manchester Road sewers or the River Thames under gravity.

== Listing ==
Outram nicknamed the pumping station the Temple of Storms. In 2017, it was granted grade II* heritage status by Historic England during the London Festival of Architecture. The listing additionally covered a nearby transformer house designed by Outram, and the surrounding pavement and bollards. The designation was the first in a push for greater representation of post–modern buildings on the National Heritage List for England, due to the destruction of many such structures before they could be protected. The station is considered to be one of Outram's best-known works and was one of his seven surviving buildings in Britain upon its listing; another in Swanley was demolished prior to an assessment.

The station was designated as the 1988 entry in The Twentieth Century Society's book 100 Buildings 100 Years.
