= Johann Amman =

Swiss-Russian botanist (1707–1741)

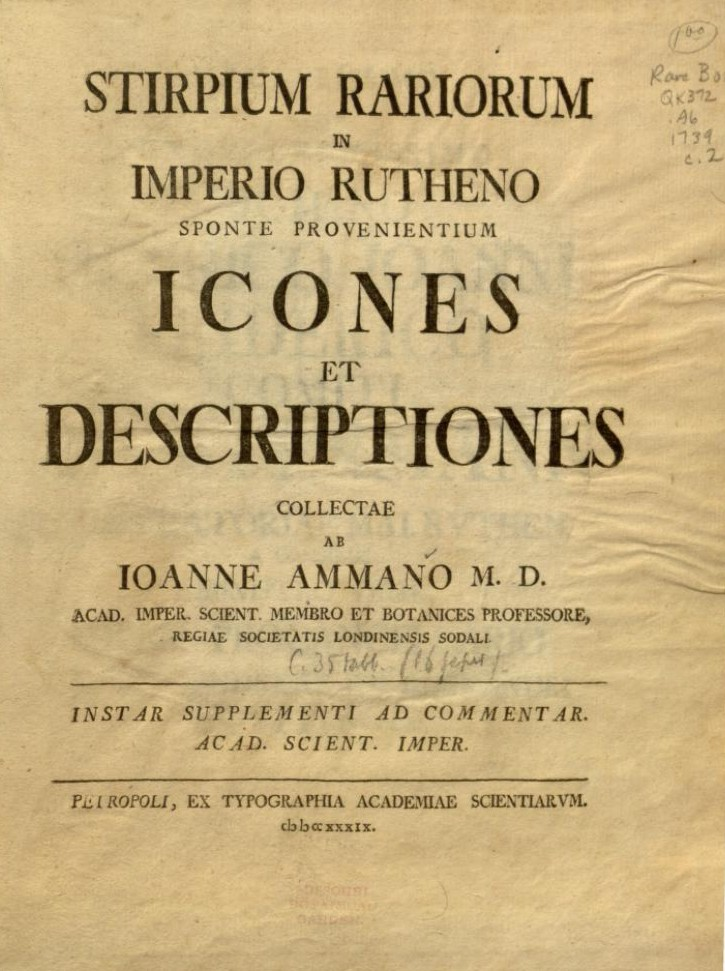

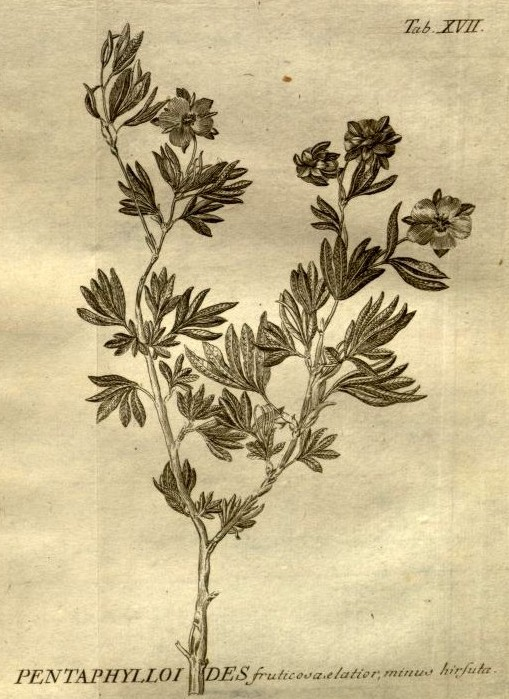
Dasiphora fruticosa (L.) Rydb. Shrubby Cinquefoil Stirpium Rariorum

Johann Amman, Johannes Amman or Иоганн Амман (22 December 1707 – 14 December 1741) was a Swiss-Russian botanist, a member of the Royal Society and professor of botany at the Russian Academy of Sciences at St Petersburg.

== Notable work ==
He is best known for his Stirpium Rariorum in Imperio Rutheno Sponte Provenientium Icones et Descriptiones published in 1739 with descriptions of some 285 plants from Eastern Europe and Ruthenia (now Ukraine). The plates are unsigned, though an engraving on the dedicatory leaf of the work is signed "Philipp Georg Mattarnovy", a Swiss-Italian engraver, Filippo Giorgio Mattarnovi (1716–1742), who worked at the St. Petersburg Academy.

== Life ==
He was born in Schaffhausen. Amman was a student of Herman Boerhaave at Leyden from where he graduated as a physician in 1729. He came from Schaffhausen in Switzerland in 1729 to help Hans Sloane curate his natural history collection. Sloane was founder of the Chelsea Physic Garden and originator of the British Museum. Amman went on to St Petersburg at the invitation of Johann Georg Gmelin (1709–1755) and became a member of the Russian Academy of Sciences, regularly sending interesting plants, such as Gypsophila paniculata, back to Sloane. Linnaeus maintained a lively correspondence with Amman between 1736 and 1740.

Amman founded the Botanical Garden of the Academy of Sciences on Vasilyevsky Island in St Petersburg in 1735. In 1739 he married Elisabetha Schumacher, daughter of Johann Daniel Schumacher, the court librarian in St Petersburg. He died in St Petersburg.

== Naming ==
Ammannia of the Lythraceae was named not for Johann Amman, but for Paul Amman (1634–1691), botanist, physiologist and director of the Hortus Medicus at the University of Leipzig and who published work on Materia medica in 1675.

Johann Amman is denoted by the author abbreviation Amman when citing a botanical name.
