= McKay Trading Estate =

Trading estate in Slough, England

Coordinates: 51.474°N 0.514°W

The McKay Trading Estate in Slough, Berkshire, is a grade II listed building with Historic England. It was completed in 1976–78, for the architect John Outram.
