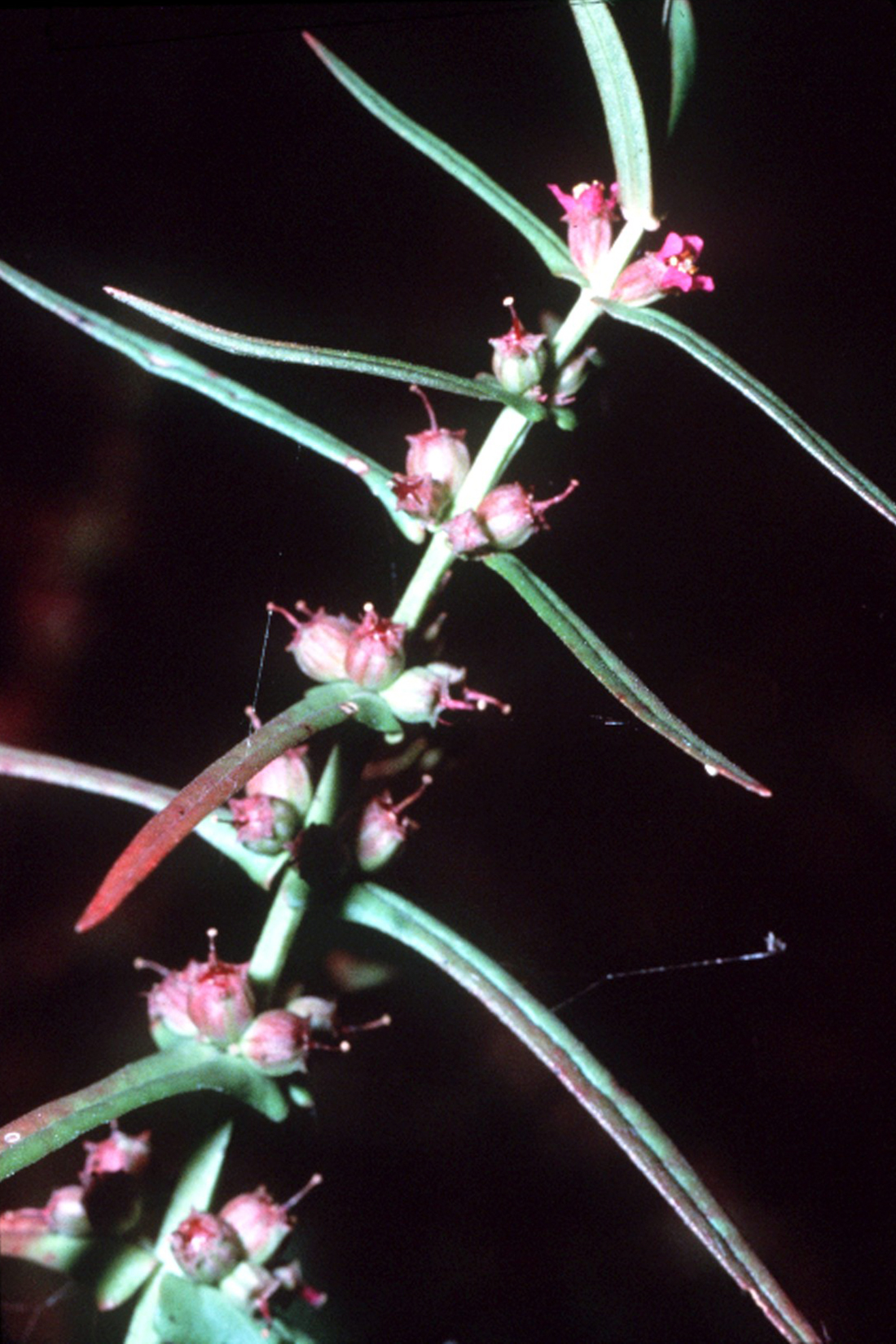
- Ammannia coccinea

Scientific classification
- Kingdom: Plantae
- Clade: Tracheophytes
- Clade: Angiosperms
- Clade: Eudicots
- Clade: Rosids
- Order: Myrtales
- Family: Lythraceae
- Subfamily: Lythroideae
- Genus: Ammannia; L.

Synonyms
- List: Ammania (orthographic variant); Ameletia DC.; Ammannella Miq.; Chrysolyga Willd. ex Steud.; Cornelia Ard.; Crena Scop.; Crenea Aubl.; Cryptotheca Blume; Diplostemon DC. ex Miq.; Ditheca Miq.; Dodecas L.f.; Eutelia R.Br. ex DC.; Faya Neck.; Hapalocarpum Miq.; Hionanthera A.Fern. & Diniz; Hoshiarpuria Hajra, P.Daniel & Philcox; Hydrolythrum Hook.f.; Nesaea Comm. ex Kunth; Nesoea Wight; Nexilis Raf.; Ronconia Raf.; Tolypeuma E.Mey.; Trotula Comm. ex DC.

= Ammannia =

Genus of flowering plants

Ammannia is a genus of over 100 species of flowering plants often referred to as redstems from wet areas in America, Africa, Asia, Australia and Europe. Several species are grown as decorative plants in aquariums.

The genus was named (but not published) by William Houstoun and later published by Linnaeus, who later indicated that the name honored Paul Amman. However, Philip Miller, who received Houstoun's manuscripts on Houston's death, stated that it honored Johann Amman.

== Species ==
As of July 2025, Plants of the World Online accepts 108 species:

- Ammannia aegyptiaca Willd.
- Ammannia alata (Immelman) S.A.Graham & Gandhi
- Ammannia alternifolia H.Perrier
- Ammannia anagalloides Sond.
- Ammannia andongensis (Welw. ex Hiern) S.A.Graham & Gandhi
- Ammannia angolensis (A.Fern. & Diniz) S.A.Graham & Gandhi
- Ammannia angustifolia (A.Fern. & Diniz) S.A.Graham & Gandhi
- Ammannia arnhemica (F.Muell.) S.A.Graham & Gandhi
- Ammannia aspera Guill. & Perr.
- Ammannia auriculata Willd. – eared redstem
- Ammannia aurita (Koehne) S.A.Graham & Gandhi
- Ammannia baccifera L. – monarch redstem, blistering ammannia
- Ammannia baumii (Koehne) S.A.Graham & Gandhi
- Ammannia bequaertii (De Wild.) S.A.Graham & Gandhi
- Ammannia brevistyla S.A.Graham & Gandhi
- Ammannia burttii (Verdc.) S.A.Graham & Gandhi
- Ammannia calcicola (H.Perrier) S.A.Graham & Gandhi
- Ammannia capitellata (C.Presl) S.A.Graham & Gandhi
- Ammannia cinerea (A.Fern. & Diniz) S.A.Graham & Gandhi
- Ammannia coccinea Rottb. – valley redstem, purple ammannia
- Ammannia cordata Wight & Arn.
- Ammannia crassicaulis Guill. & Perr.
- Ammannia crinipes F.Muell.
- Ammannia cymosa (Immelman) S.A.Graham & Gandhi
- Ammannia debilis Aiton
- Ammannia desertorum Blatt. & Hallb.
- Ammannia dichotoma (Blume) S.G.Panigrahi
- Ammannia dinteri (Koehne) S.A.Graham & Gandhi
- Ammannia dodecandra DC.
- Ammannia drummondii (A.Fern.) S.A.Graham & Gandhi
- Ammannia elata A.Fern.
- Ammannia engleri (Koehne) S.A.Graham & Gandhi
- Ammannia erecta (Guill. & Perr.) S.A.Graham & Gandhi
- Ammannia fernandesiana S.A.Graham & Gandhi
- Ammannia fitzgeraldii R.L.Barrett
- Ammannia fruticosa (A.Fern. & Diniz) S.A.Graham & Gandhi
- Ammannia gazensis (A.Fern.) S.A.Graham & Gandhi
- Ammannia gracilis Guill. & Perr.
- Ammannia grayi S.A.Graham & Gandhi
- Ammannia heptamera (Hiern) S.A.Graham & Gandhi
- Ammannia herbacea W.J.de Wilde & Duyfjes
- Ammannia heterophylla (H.Perrier) S.A.Graham & Gandhi
- Ammannia icosandra (Kotschy & Peyr.) S.A.Graham & Gandhi
- Ammannia involucrata S.A.Graham & Gandhi
- Ammannia kilimandscharica (Koehne) S.A.Graham & Gandhi
- Ammannia latifolia L. – pink redstem
- Ammannia linearipetala A.Fern. & Diniz
- Ammannia linearis (Hiern) S.A.Graham & Gandhi
- Ammannia linifolia (Welw. ex Hiern) S.A.Graham & Gandhi
- Ammannia loandensis Welw. ex Hiern
- Ammannia luederitzii (Koehne) S.A.Graham & Gandhi
- Ammannia lythroides (Welw. ex Hiern) S.A.Graham & Gandhi
- Ammannia maritima (Aubl.) S.A.Graham, P.W.Inglis & T.B.Cavalc.
- Ammannia maxima (Koehne) S.A.Graham & Gandhi
- Ammannia minima (Immelman) S.A.Graham & Gandhi
- Ammannia moggii (A.Fern.) S.A.Graham & Gandhi
- Ammannia mossambicensis (A.Fern. & Diniz) S.A.Graham & Gandhi
- Ammannia mossiensis (A.Chev.) S.A.Graham & Gandhi
- Ammannia muelleri (Hewson) S.A.Graham & Gandhi
- Ammannia multiflora Roxb.
- Ammannia nagpurensis T.Mathew & M.P.Nayar
- Ammannia octandra L.f.
- Ammannia palmeri (S.A.Graham) S.A.Graham & Gandhi
- Ammannia parkeri (Verdc.) S.A.Graham & Gandhi
- Ammannia parvula S.A.Graham & Gandhi
- Ammannia passerinoides Welw. ex Hiern.
- Ammannia patentinervius (Koehne) S.A.Graham, P.W.Inglis & T.B.Cavalc.
- Ammannia pauciramosa S.A.Graham & Gandhi
- Ammannia pedicellata (Hiern) S.A.Graham & Gandhi
- Ammannia pedroi (A.Fern. & Diniz) S.A.Graham & Gandhi
- Ammannia petrensis (M.G.Gilbert & Thulin) S.A.Graham & Gandhi
- Ammannia polycephala (Peter) S.A.Graham & Gandhi
- Ammannia praetermissa (Kasselm.) Kasselm.
- Ammannia prieuriana Guill. & Perr.
- Ammannia pringlei (Rose) S.A.Graham & Gandhi
- Ammannia prostrata Buch.-Ham. ex Dillwyn
- Ammannia pubescens (Koehne) S.A.Graham & Gandhi
- Ammannia purpurascens (A.Fern.) S.A.Graham & Gandhi
- Ammannia quadriciliata H.Perrier
- Ammannia radicans (Guill. & Perr.) S.A.Graham & Gandhi
- Ammannia ramosissima (A.Fern. & Diniz) S.A.Graham & Gandhi
- Ammannia rautanenii (Koehne) S.A.Graham & Gandhi
- Ammannia rigidula (Sond.) S.A.Graham & Gandhi
- Ammannia robertsii (F.Muell.) S.A.Graham & Gandhi
- Ammannia robinsoniana (A.Fern.) S.A.Graham & Gandhi
- Ammannia robusta Heer & Regel – grand redstem, scarlet ammannia
- Ammannia sagittifolia (Sond.) S.A.Graham & Gandhi
- Ammannia saluta (Immelman) S.A.Graham & Gandhi
- Ammannia santoi (A.Fern. & Diniz) S.A.Graham & Gandhi
- Ammannia sarcophylla Welw. ex Hiern.
- Ammannia schaeferi Koehne ex Engl.
- Ammannia schinzii (Koehne) S.A.Graham & Gandhi
- Ammannia schlechteri (A.Fern.) S.A.Graham & Gandhi
- Ammannia senegalensis Lam.
- Ammannia spathulata (A.Fern.) S.A.Graham & Gandhi
- Ammannia striatiflora (Hewson) S.A.Graham & Gandhi
- Ammannia stuhlmannii (Koehne) S.A.Graham & Gandhi
- Ammannia teixeirae (A.Fern.) S.A.Graham & Gandhi
- Ammannia tolypobotrys (Koehne) S.A.Graham & Gandhi
- Ammannia triflora R.Br. ex Benth.
- Ammannia uniflora Meijden
- Ammannia urceolata Hiern
- Ammannia verticillata (Ard.) Lam.
- Ammannia volkensii (Koehne) S.A.Graham & Gandhi
- Ammannia wardii (Immelman) S.A.Graham & Gandhi
- Ammannia woodii (Koehne) S.A.Graham & Gandhi
- Ammannia wormskioldii Fisch. & C.A.Mey.
- Ammannia zambatidis (Immelman) S.A.Graham & Gandhi
