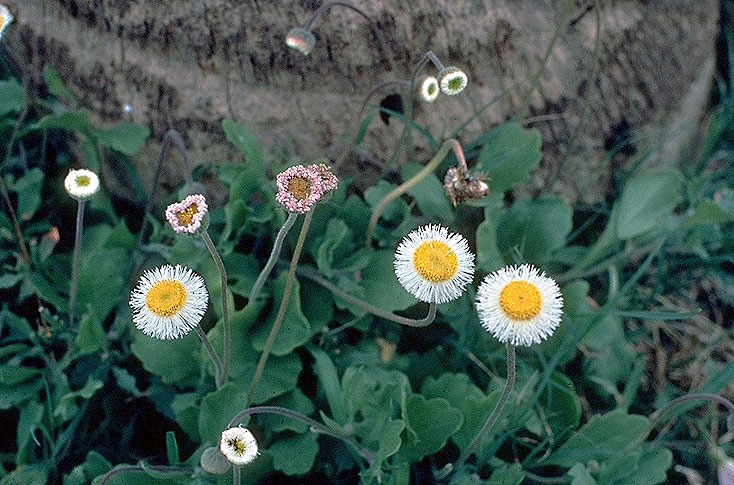

Scientific classification
- Kingdom: Plantae
- Clade: Tracheophytes
- Clade: Angiosperms
- Clade: Eudicots
- Clade: Asterids
- Order: Asterales
- Family: Asteraceae
- Genus: Erigeron
- Species: E. procumbens

Binomial name
- Erigeron procumbens (Houst. ex Mill.) G.L.Nesom

Synonyms
- Aster procumbens Houst. ex Mill.; Aster rivularis Less. 1830 not Sw. 1788; Erigeron myrionactis Small; Erigeron repens A.Gray 1884 not (Kunth) Wedd. 1857

= Erigeron procumbens =

Species of flowering plant

Erigeron procumbens is a North American species of flowering plant in the family Asteraceae known by the common name Corpus Christi fleabane, referring to a coastal city in Texas. The species grows along the coastal plain and coastal strand of the Gulf of Mexico in the states of Veracruz, Tamaulipas, Texas, Louisiana, and Mississippi.

Erigeron procumbens is a perennial herb up to 40 centimeters (16 inches) tall; the stems are very often procumbent (lying on the ground instead of growing straight up). The plant generally produces only one flower head per stem. Each head has 225–350 pink or white ray florets surrounding numerous yellow disc florets. The species grows in wet depressions between dunes as well as on roadsides and on the edges of mudflats and salt marshes.
