= Paul Amman =

German botanist and medical doctor (1634–1691)

Paul Amman (31 August 1634 – 4 February 1691) was a German medical doctor and botanist.

== Biography ==
Amman was born at Breslau, Silesia, Kingdom of Bohemia, Holy Roman Empire (now Wrocław, Poland) in 1634. In 1662, he received the degree of doctor of physic from the university of Leipzig, and in 1664 was admitted a member of the society Naturae Curiosorum, under the name of Dryander. Shortly afterwards he was chosen extraordinary professor of medicine in the above-mentioned university; and in 1674 he was promoted to the botanical chair, which he again in 1682 exchanged for the physiological. He died at Leipzig in 1691. He seems to have been a man of critical mind and extensive learning. William Houstoun named the species Ammannia in his honor, a name that was used by Linnaeus in his Critica Botanica.

== Works ==
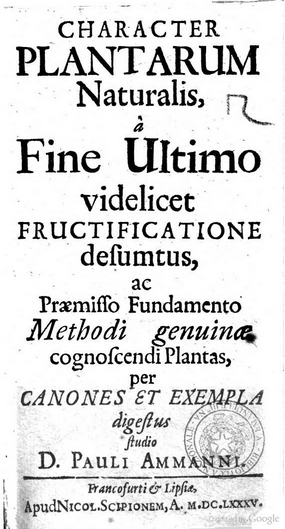
Title page of a 1685 publication

His principal works were:

- Medicina Critica (1670)
- Paraenesis ad Docentes occupata circa Institutionum Medicarum Emendationem (1673)
- Supellex Botanica (1675)
- Character Naturalis Plantarum (1676)
- Irenicum Numae Pompilii cum Hippocrate (1689)
