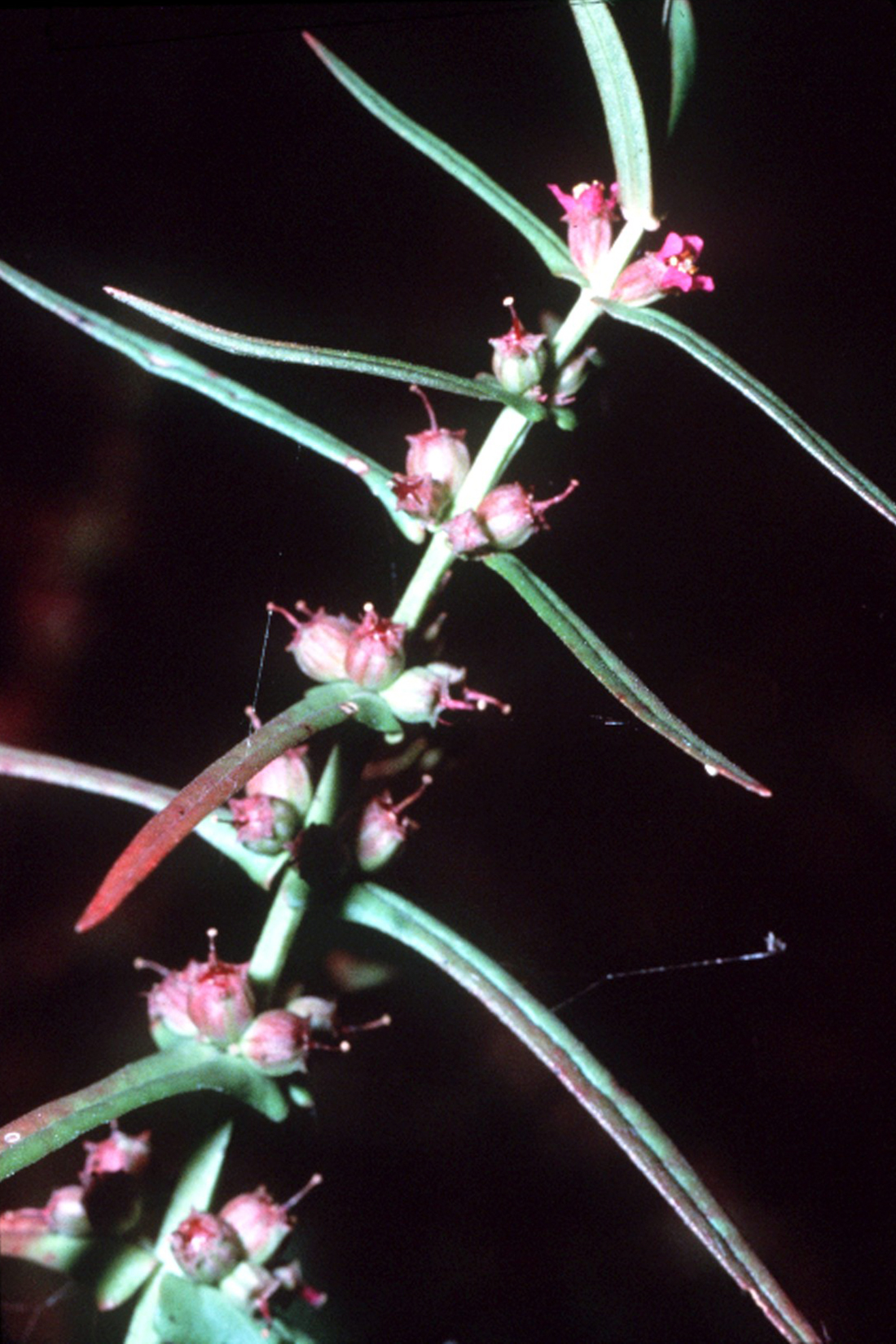

Conservation status
- Secure (NatureServe)

Scientific classification
- Kingdom: Plantae
- Clade: Tracheophytes
- Clade: Angiosperms
- Clade: Eudicots
- Clade: Rosids
- Order: Myrtales
- Family: Lythraceae
- Genus: Ammannia
- Species: A. coccinea

Binomial name
- Ammannia coccinea Rottb.

Subspecies
- A. coccinea subsp. coccinea; A. coccinea subsp. pubiflora

Synonyms
- Ammannia teres

= Ammannia coccinea =

Plant species in the loosestrife family

Ammannia coccinea is a species of flowering plant in the loosestrife family known by several common names, including valley redstem, scarlet toothcup, and purple ammannia. It is native to most of the contiguous United States, with the exception of the Pacific Northwest and New England. It is generally found in moist areas, such as riverbanks and pond margins. It is weedy in some areas. This is an annual herb growing erect to heights approaching one meter or lying along the ground. Leaves are linear in shape, up to 8 centimeters long, and green to shades of deep red in color. The inflorescence is a cluster of 3 to 5 flowers growing in the leaf axils along the upper part of the stem. The rounded flower has small rose to lavender petals each a few millimeters long and protruding stamens with yellow anthers. The fruit is a rounded capsule up to half a centimeter wide containing many tiny seeds.
