= Anthony du Gard Pasley =

Landscape architect and garden designer

Anthony du Gard Pasley (10 August 1929 – 2 October 2009) was a garden designer and landscape architect, who created many private gardens in Britain, Switzerland, southern France and other parts of Europe. He was known for his control of space and his extensive plant knowledge.

He was born in Ealing and grew up in Sherborne. Of Irish descent, his grandfather William was a Dublin-born watercolourist, inventor and inheritor of the family engineering company. His father Rex was a metallurgist who became a production engineer at aircraft company Handley Page during the Second World War. Pasley was educated at King's College School, Wimbledon. He undertook his national service in the army, and served in the Royal Army Service Corps for 16 years. In 1955 he prevented the demolition of Great Maytham Hall. In 1964, he bought Romanoff Lodge in Tunbridge Wells, which he saved from demolition.

Pasley studied under Brenda Colvin, then worked for Colvin and Sylvia Crowe. He worked in the design department of landscapers Wallace and Barr for four years, winning a gold medal for a garden at the Chelsea Flower Show, then returned to work for Crowe. He was senior associate at Sylvia Crowe and Associates from 1967 to 1972, where he worked on large landscape projects such as American air-bases, new towns, power stations and roads.

He taught Rosemary Alexander, and in 1983 helped her establish the English Gardening School at the Chelsea Physic Garden, where he was one of the principal lecturers. He also lectured at the Regent Street Polytechnic, the Northern Polytechnic, the School of Architecture in Canterbury, and the Inchbald School of Design in London. He was a principal judge for the Chelsea Flower Show, an active member of the Garden History Society, an active member of the Royal Caledonian Horticultural Society, an early member of the Landscape Institute, and a Fellow of the Society of Garden Designers. He wrote for Country Life, The Observer newspaper, and the Architectural Review.

He was president of the Paisley Family Society for 15 years. For the last 17 years of his life he had homes in Groombridge, Tunbridge Wells, and Moffat in Scotland. He was always exquisitely dressed, with a moustache and monocle.

== Selected gardens ==
- Birnam, Kent
- Chilstone Show Gardens, Langton Green, Tunbridge Wells
- Dornden, Tunbridge Wells
- Hole Park, Kent
- Old Place Farm, High Halden
- Parsonage Farm gardens at Kirdford
- Pashley Manor, East Sussex
- The Postern, Kent
- St Clere Farms, Kemsing
- Wadhurst Park, Sussex

== Books ==
- Du Gard Pasley, Anthony (1977). Summer flowers. London: Allen Lane. ISBN 0713910062.
- Alexander, Rosemary; Du Gard Pasley, Anthony (1987). The English gardening school : a complete course in garden planning and design. London: Joseph. ISBN 0718127730.
- Du Gard Pasley, Anthony (2013). Garden and landscape: the lectures of Anthony du Gard Pasley. Chichester: Packard Publishing. ISBN 9781853411359.

== Bibliography ==
- Isles-Buck, Emma (2017). Pasley: memories of Anthony du Gard Pasley, garden designer and landscape architect 1929-2009. Exeter: Emma Isles-Buck. ISBN 1527211053.
- Brookes, John (Winter 2009). "John Brookes remembers Anthony du Gard Pasley, 1929-2009". Hortus (92).
