= Ammannia fitzgeraldii =

Scientific classification
- Kingdom: Plantae
- Clade: Tracheophytes
- Clade: Angiosperms
- Clade: Eudicots
- Clade: Rosids
- Order: Myrtales
- Family: Lythraceae
- Genus: Ammannia
- Species: A. fitzgeraldii

Binomial name
- Ammannia fitzgeraldii R.L.Barrett

Species of flowering plant

Ammannia fitzgeraldii is a species in the family Lythraceae that is endemic to northern Australia.

The species is found in the Kimberley region of Western Australia.
