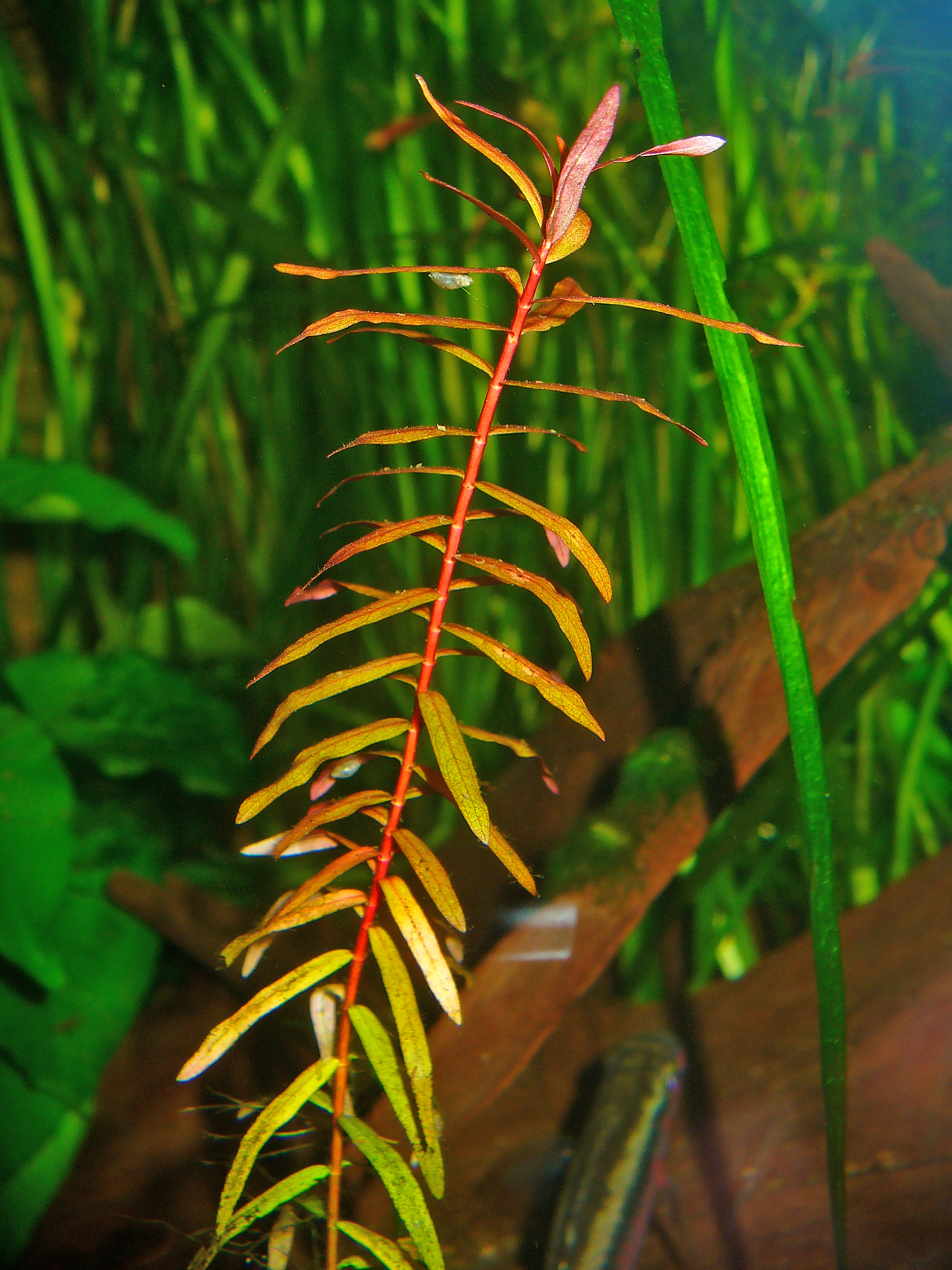

Scientific classification
- Kingdom: Plantae
- Clade: Tracheophytes
- Clade: Angiosperms
- Clade: Eudicots
- Clade: Rosids
- Order: Myrtales
- Family: Lythraceae
- Genus: Ammannia
- Species: A. senegalensis

Binomial name
- Ammannia senegalensis Lam.

= Ammannia senegalensis =

Species of aquatic plant

Ammannia senegalensis, also known as copper leaf ammania, is a flowering plant native to western Senegal. It often grows as a weed in rice paddies.

The stem presents opposite leaves that start out green and rather broad and, later, become more narrow and reddish in colour. The leaves especially become red under intense light. There are several varieties, of unknown status, that differ in leaf shape and colour.

The flowers are inconspicuous, growing from the leaf axils of emersed plants.

== Cultivation ==
These plants prefer intense light for optimum growth. They can grow quickly in the right conditions and will grow in flooded conditions, if the water is shallow enough. They also grow very well with additional carbon dioxide added to the water. Ideal water conditions are soft and acidic, but these plants are generally hardy and adaptable in most moderate conditions. To grow well, they need a good iron micronutrient to be added to an aquarium.

They can be easily propagated by pushing cuttings into the substrate.

== Bibliography ==
- Turrill, W. B. et al., eds. 1952–. Flora of Tropical East Africa.
