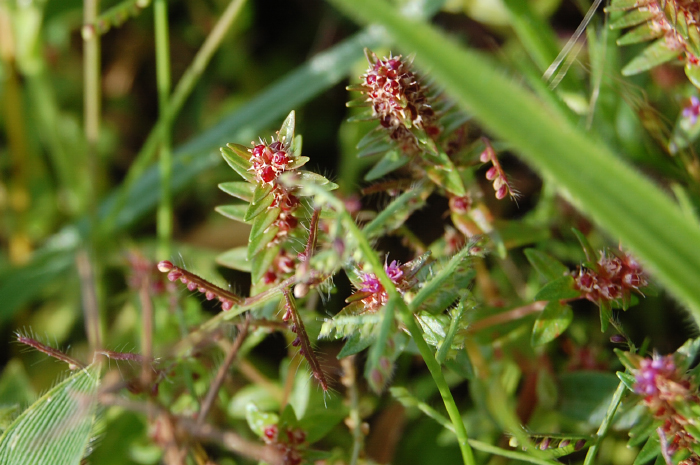

Conservation status
- Least Concern (IUCN 3.1)

Scientific classification
- Kingdom: Plantae
- Clade: Embryophytes
- Clade: Tracheophytes
- Clade: Angiosperms
- Clade: Eudicots
- Clade: Rosids
- Order: Myrtales
- Family: Lythraceae
- Genus: Ammannia
- Species: A. baccifera

Binomial name
- Ammannia baccifera L.

Synonyms
- Ammannia aegyptiaca Willd.

= Ammannia baccifera =

Monarch redstem

Species of flowering plant

Ammannia baccifera, also known as the monarch redstem or blistering ammannia, is a species in the family Lythraceae. It is widespread in the tropical regions of Asia, America and Africa. It has been naturalized in Spain. It is annual and herbaceous, and can be found in marshes, swamps, rice fields and water courses at low elevations. It is considered endangered in Israel, but because it is widespread and common elsewhere, the IUCN considers it to be 'Least Concern'. The plant Ammannia baccifera Linn. is erect, branched, smooth, slender, annual, more or less purplish herb 10 to 50 centimeters in height. The stems are somewhat 4-angled. The leaves are oblong, oblanceolate, or narrowly elliptic, about 3.5 centimeters long – those on the branches very numerous, small, and 1 to 1.5 centimeters long – with narrowed base and pointed or somewhat rounded tip. The flowers are small, about 1.2 millimeters long, greenish or purplish, and borne in dense axillary clusters. The capsules are nearly spherical, depressed, about 1.2 millimeters in diameter, purple, and irregularly circumscribes above the middle. The seeds are black (Nadkarni, 1982).

== Properties and Uses ==
The bitter herb is an appetizer, stomachic and is useful in treating biliousness [bad digestion, stomach pains, constipation, and excessive flatulence (passing gas)]; the leaves are beneficial for removing phlegm from the lungs and trachea. According to Ayurvedic pandits, the herbal extract is a good remedy for tuberculosis and typhoid fever. The plant juice mixed with ginger extract is helpful for curing fevers. Tribal believe that the herb is an effective remedy for all blood diseases. In India, the leaves are used to reduce the sexual libido in animals. The leaves are acrid and find application in folk medicine for the treatment of rheumatic pain, as laxative, rubefacient and external remedy for ring worm (Kirtikar, 1972). This plant was found to possess hypothermic, hypertensive, antiurolithiasis, antibacterial and CNS depressant activities (Dhar et al., 1973; Bharathi and Srinivasan, 1994; Al-Sharma and Mitschar, 1979). Recent studies have demonstrated that the ethanol extract from Ammannia baccifera possess antisteroidogenic (Ramaiyan Danapal et al., 2005), antioxidant and hepato-protective activities (Lavanya et al., 2009). Some chemical compounds found in this herb are betulinic acid, daucosterol, ellagic acid, n-hentricontane, lupeol, quercetin and triacontane-1,30-diol.
