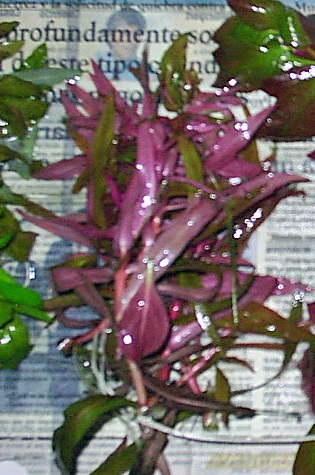

Scientific classification
- Kingdom: Plantae
- Clade: Tracheophytes
- Clade: Angiosperms
- Clade: Eudicots
- Clade: Rosids
- Order: Myrtales
- Family: Lythraceae
- Genus: Ammannia
- Species: A. gracilis

Binomial name
- Ammannia gracilis Guill. & Perr.

= Ammannia gracilis =

Species of aquatic plant

Ammannia gracilis is a species of flowering plant in the family Lythraceae. It is native to Africa.

This aquatic plant has a branching, prostrate stem that roots at the nodes. The blunt-tipped, lance-shaped leaves are roughly a centimeter long. The small flowers have four purple petals and either 4 or 8 stamens. The flowers occur in small clusters.
