= Chelsea Physic Garden =

Botanical garden in Chelsea, London

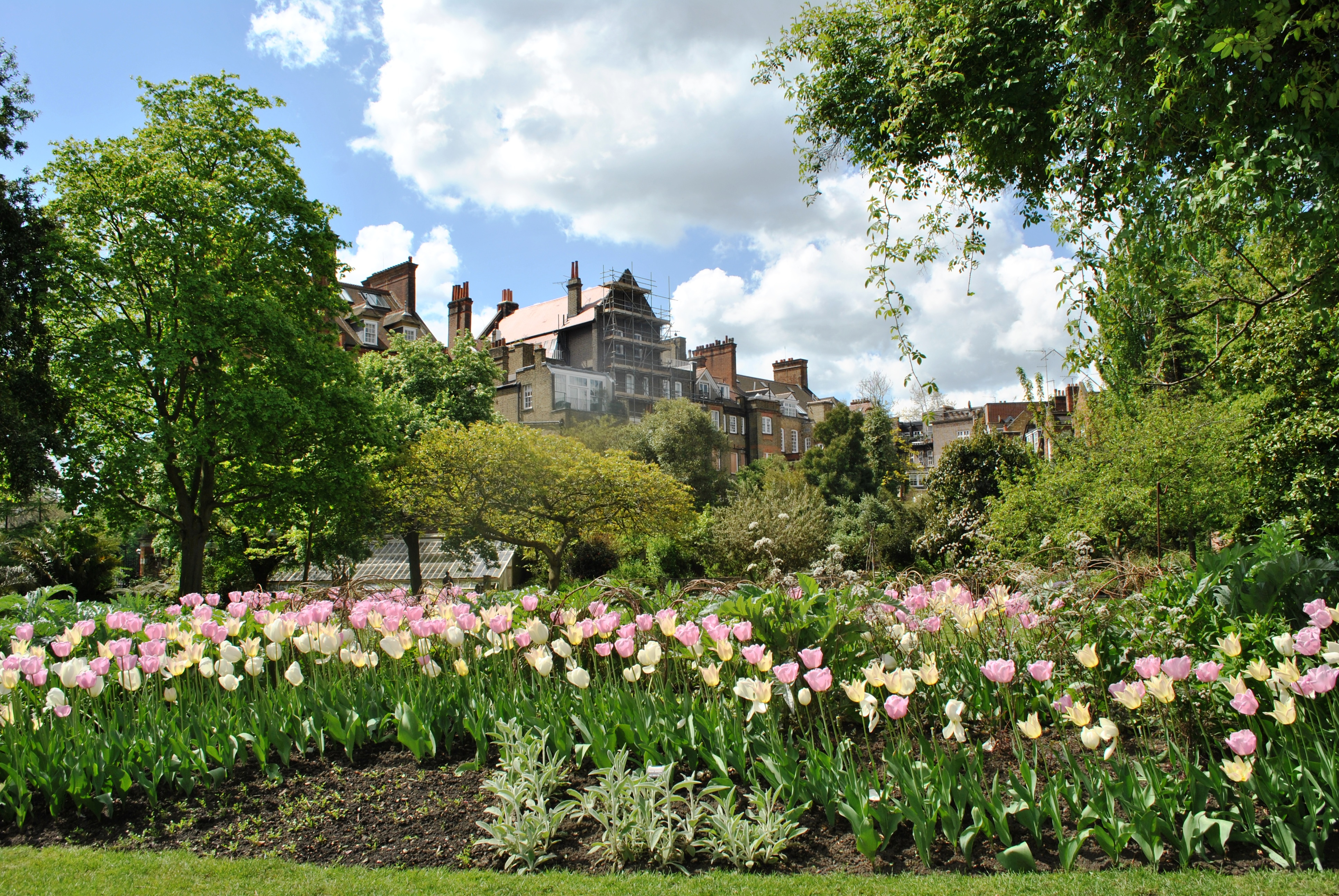
- Chelsea Physic Garden, London
- Interactive map of Chelsea Physic Garden
- Location: Chelsea, London
- Coordinates: 51°29′6″N 0°9′46″W
- Area: 3.5 acres (1.4 ha)
- Created: 1673
- Founder: Worshipful Society of Apothecaries
- Species: 5,000
- Website: Official website

The Chelsea Physic Garden was established as the Apothecaries' Garden in London, England, in 1673 by the Worshipful Society of Apothecaries to grow plants to be used as medicines. This four-acre physic garden, the term here referring to the science of healing, is among the oldest botanical gardens in Britain, after the University of Oxford Botanic Garden. Its rock garden is the oldest in Europe devoted to alpine plants and Mediterranean plants. The garden has high brick walls which trap heat, giving it a warm micro-climate, and it claims the largest fruiting olive tree in Britain and the world's northernmost grapefruit growing outdoors. Jealously guarded during the tenure of the Worshipful Society of Apothecaries, the garden became a registered charity in 1983 and was opened to the general public for the first time.

The garden is a member of the London Museums of Health & Medicine. It is also Grade I listed in the Register of Historic Parks and Gardens of Special Historic Interest in England by English Heritage.

== History ==
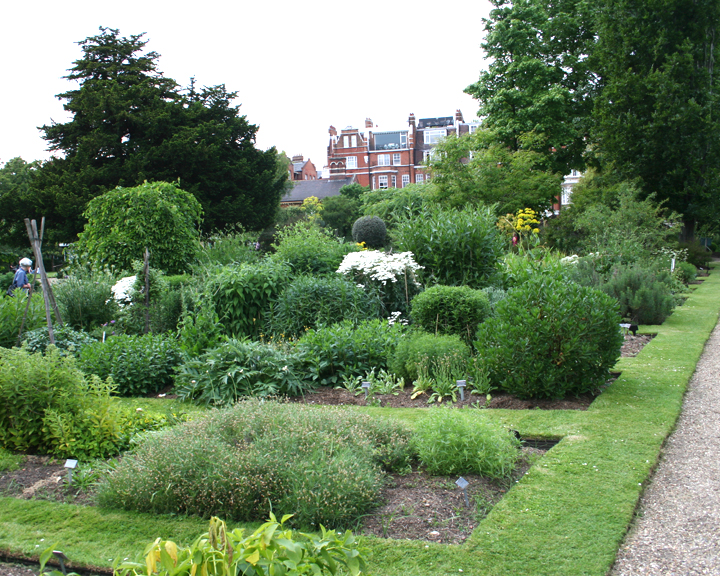
The garden in summer 2006

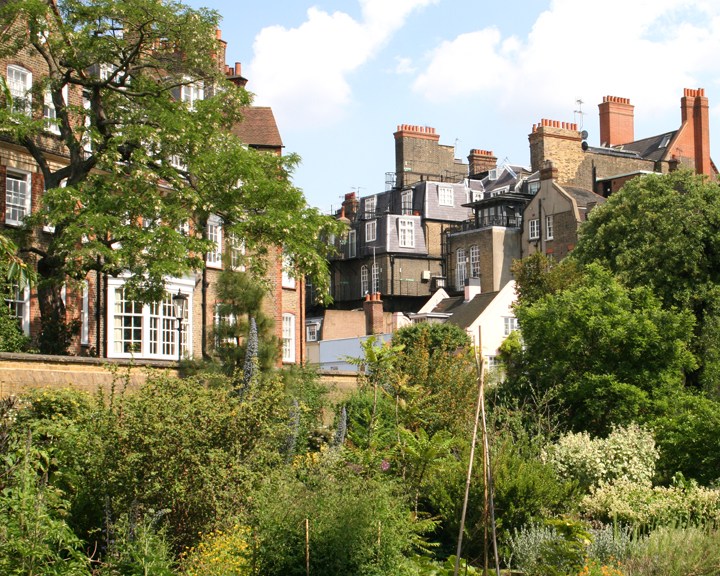
The garden with the house visible in the background

The Worshipful Society of Apothecaries initially established the garden on a leased site of Sir John Danvers' well-established garden in Chelsea, London. This house, called Danvers House, adjoined the mansion that had once been the house of Sir Thomas More. Danvers House was pulled down in 1696 to make room for Danvers Street.

In 1713, Sir Hans Sloane purchased from Charles Cheyne the adjacent Manor of Chelsea, about 4 acres (1.6 ha), which he leased in 1722 to the Society of Apothecaries for £5 a year in perpetuity, requiring in the Deed of Conveyance that the garden supply the Royal Society, of which he was a principal, with 50 good herbarium samples per year, up to a total of 2,000 plants.

That initiated the golden age of the Chelsea Physic Garden under the direction of Philip Miller (1722–1770), when it became the world's most richly stocked botanic garden. Its seed-exchange programme was established following a visit in 1682 from Paul Hermann, a Dutch botanist connected with the Hortus Botanicus Leiden and has lasted until the present day. The seed exchange programme's most notable act may have been the introduction of cotton into the colony of Georgia and more recently, the worldwide spread of the Madagascar periwinkle (Catharanthus roseus).

Isaac Rand, a member and a fellow of the Royal Society, published a condensed catalogue of the garden in 1730, Index plantarum officinalium, quas ad materiae medicae scientiam promovendam, in horto Chelseiano. Elizabeth Blackwell's A Curious Herbal (1737–1739) was illustrated partly from specimens taken from the Chelsea Physic Garden. In 1781, the collection of specimens was donated by the Royal Society to the British Museum in Bloomsbury, then moved in 1881 to the Department of Botany of the British Museum in Kensington, now the Natural History Museum.

Sir Joseph Banks worked with the head gardener and curator John Fairbairn during the 1780–1814 period. Fairbairn specialized in growing and cultivating plants from around the world.

Parts of the garden have been lost to road development – the river bank during 1874 construction of the Chelsea Embankment on the north bank of the River Thames, and a strip of the garden to allow widening of Royal Hospital Road. What remains is a 3.5 acres (1.4 ha) patch in the heart of London.

The Trustees of the London Parochial Charities took over management of the garden in 1899 and for the majority of the twentieth century, it was used for scientific research and was not open to the public. In 1983, the garden became a charity and was run by a private board of trustees, and a few years later in 1987, it was open to the general public for the first time.

In 2001 the then director Rosie Atkins led changes that improved the educational role of the garden.

As of 2025, the chair of the trust that manages the Garden is Sarah Flannigan. Since 2014, the garden director is Sue Medway MBE.

== Current garden ==
As of October 2017, the garden included 5,000 plants, in areas such as:

- The Garden of Medicinal Plants
- The Pharmaceutical Garden, with plants arranged according to the ailment they are used to treat
- The Garden of World Medicine, with medicinal plants arranged by the culture which uses them
- The Garden of Edible and Useful Plants
- The World Woodland Garden

== Associated people ==
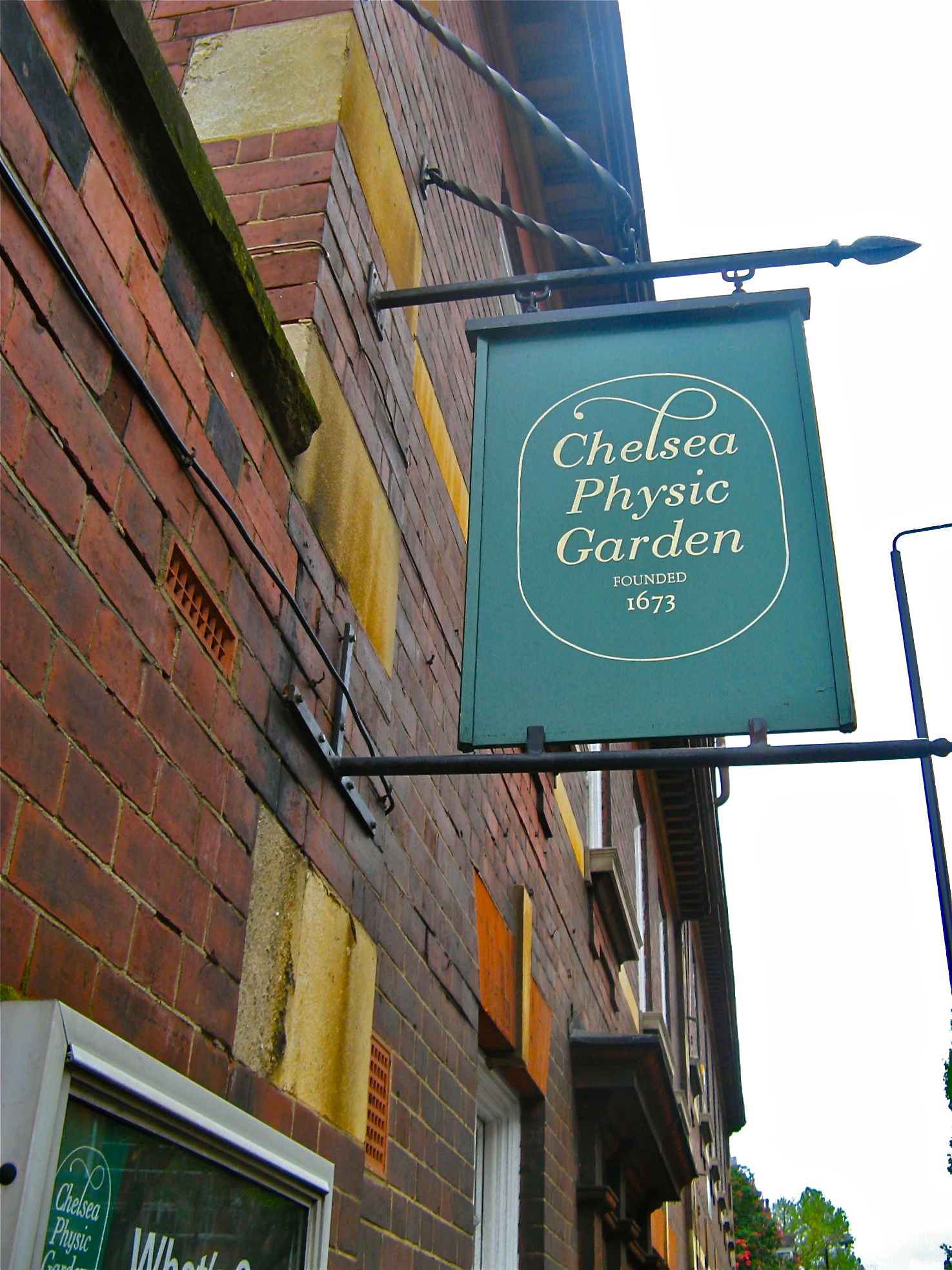
Ensign of the garden

- William Aiton
- Johann Amman
- Alexander Anderson
- William Anderson (horticulturist)
- Joseph Banks
- John Bartram
- Elizabeth Blackwell
- Edward Augustus Bowles
- Mark Catesby
- Lilian Clarke
- William Curtis
- George Don
- Samuel Doody
- Henry Field (apothecary)
- William Forsyth
- Robert Fortune
- John Fraser
- John Graeffer
- William Houstoun
- William Hudson
- Jacob van Huysum
- Lee and Kennedy
- John Lindley
- Carl Linnaeus
- William Gregor MacKenzie
- Georg Christian Oeder
- Anthony du Gard Pasley
- Robert Petre, 8th Baron Petre
- James Sherard
- Hans Sloane
- Daniel Solander
- Mary Somerset
- Nathaniel Bagshaw Ward
