= Ammannia verticillata =

Conservation status
- Least Concern (IUCN 3.1)

Scientific classification
- Kingdom: Plantae
- Clade: Tracheophytes
- Clade: Angiosperms
- Clade: Eudicots
- Clade: Rosids
- Order: Myrtales
- Family: Lythraceae
- Genus: Ammannia
- Species: A. verticillata

Binomial name
- Ammannia verticillata (Ard.) Lam.

Synonyms
- Ammannia salicifolia Monti; Cornelia verticillata Ard.

Species of flowering plant

Ammannia verticillata is a species in the family Lythraceae. It is found in central and southeast Asia, and is naturalized in southern Europe. It grows in wet places such as marshes, river banks and rice fields.
