= Ammannia pubescens =

Conservation status
- Vulnerable (IUCN 3.1)

Scientific classification
- Kingdom: Plantae
- Clade: Embryophytes
- Clade: Tracheophytes
- Clade: Spermatophytes
- Clade: Angiosperms
- Clade: Eudicots
- Clade: Rosids
- Order: Myrtales
- Family: Lythraceae
- Genus: Ammannia
- Species: A. pubescens

Binomial name
- Ammannia pubescens (Koehne) S.A.Graham & Gandhi

Synonyms
- Euphorbia hildebrandtii; Nesaea hildebrandtii; Nesaea pubescens

Plant species in the loosestrife family

Ammannia pubescens is a rare species in the loosestrife family that is only known from one river system in northwestern Madagascar.

== Description ==
Ammannia pubescens is a small annual plant that branches from the base. The leaves are attached in pairs to opposite sides of the stems and decussately, in a crossing fashion. They are lanceolate to ovate-lanceolate in shape and measure 6–12 millimeters long and 1.5–4 mm wide.

The inflorescences are found in the axils, the angle between the leaf attachment and the stem, with a short peduncle of 2–10 millimeters, but can also attach directly to the main stem. Each inflorescence has three to five flowers that are surrounded at the base by wide bases of the bracts and bracteoles. Each flower has two narrow bracteoles as long as the sepals.

== Taxonomy ==
Ammannia pubescens was given its first scietific description in 1895 by Bernhard Adalbert Emil Koehne, who placed it in Nesaea. However, studies of the DNA published in 2011 indicated that the species in Nesaea should be placed in the Ammannia genus. In 2013 the new name was published for the species by Shirley Ann Tousch Graham and Kanchi Natarajan Gandhi. However, the same year the fact that the same collection had served as the type specimen for both Nesaea pubescens and for Euphorbia hildebrandtii, species classified in not only in a different genus, but also in separate families. Paul E. Berry proposed that they should be combined in Nesaea as Nesaea hildebrandtii. According to Plants of the World Online the correct classification is Ammannia pubescens in the Lythraceae family and following this it has three synonyms.

Table of Synonyms
Name	Year	Rank
Euphorbia hildebrandtii Baill.	1886	= het.
Nesaea hildebrandtii (Baill.) P.E.Berry	2013	= het.
Nesaea pubescens Koehne	1895	≡ hom.
Notes: ≡ homotypic synonym; = heterotypic synonym

== Range and habitat ==
Ammannia pubescens endemic to Madagascar and has seldom been collected. The known locations for the species are all along the banks of the Betsiboka River and its tributary the Ikopa River in Mahajanga Province. There it grows on sandy banks.

=== Conservation ===
The species was evaluated in 2004 by the IUCN under the name Euphorbia hildebrandtii. At that time they rated it as vulnerable in the IUCN Red List. It was given this rating due to being restricted to one small area, but it was noted that being similar to other more common weedy species.
