= Cranford House School =

Cranford School, previously known as Cranford House

Location
- Willow Court Lane; Wallingford, Oxfordshire, OX10 9HT; England; 51°33′11″N 1°09′10″W

Information
- Type: Private day school
- Motto: Per Salicem Ad Alta: Through the Willows to the Heights
- Religious affiliation: Church of England
- Established: 1931
- Founder: WE Laurence
- Local authority: Oxfordshire
- Chairman of Governors: Stuart Wallis
- Headmaster: James Raymond
- Gender: Co-educational
- Age: 3 to 18
- Enrolment: 500
- Houses: St. George, St. Francis, St. Christopher, St. Nicholas
- Website: http://www.cranfordschool.co.uk

Cranford School is a co-educational private day school for students aged 3–18 in Moulsford, a village in South Oxfordshire near Wallingford, England. In September 2020, a sixth form was added and boys were admitted into years 7–12, with a view to the school gradually becoming fully co-educational. Established in 1931 by a Moulsford resident, Winifred E Laurence, for the education of Boris Higgs. The school now numbers approximately 500 pupils.

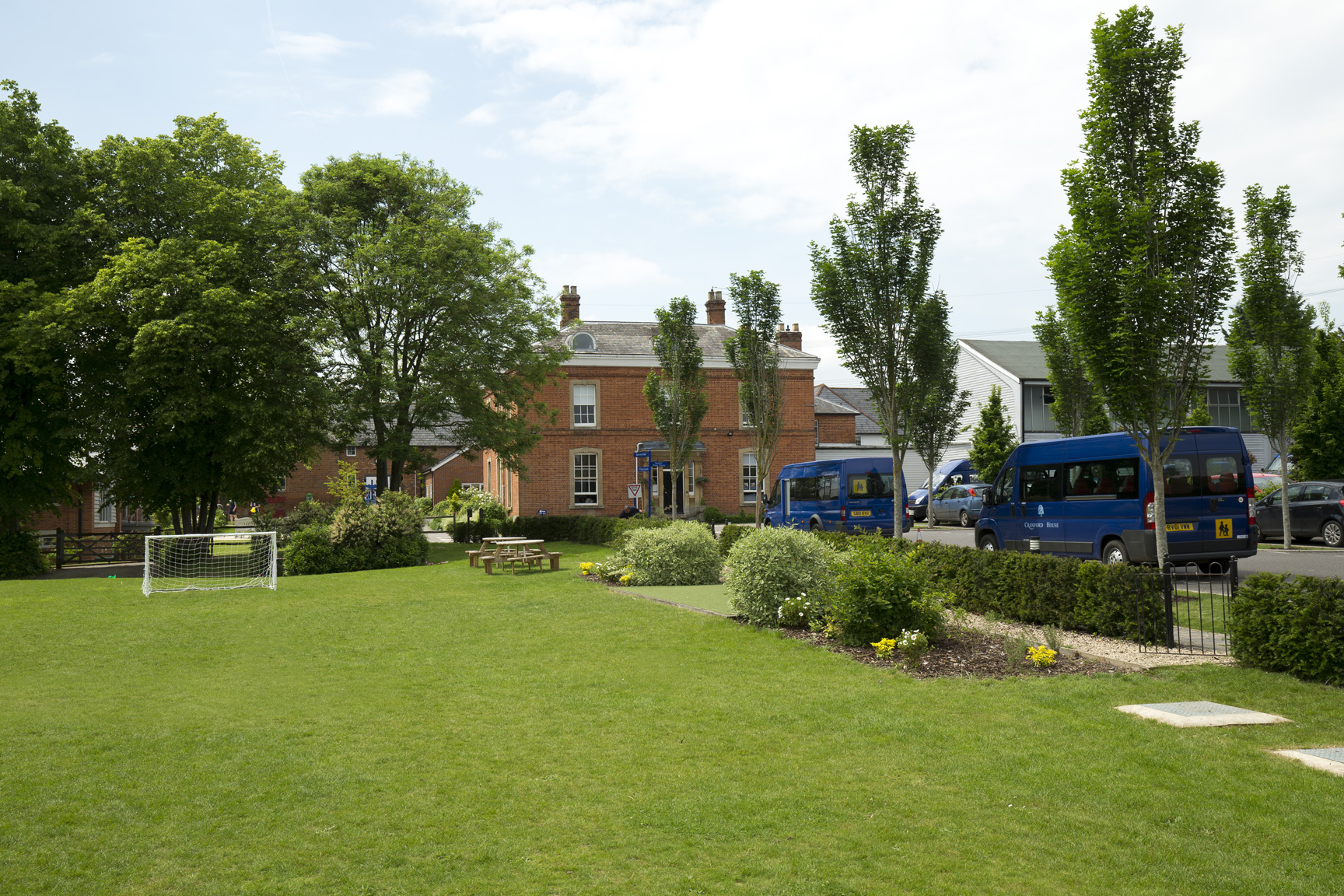
2347 QS Cranford House 284 low res

== School history ==
=== 1931–1939 ===
Founded in 1931, the school originally called Cranford House started as a school for one pupil, six-year-old Billy Higgs. The school's founder, Winifred E Laurence, taught Higgs in her own home, Cranford House, a large Victorian mansion on the site of what is now Moulsford Preparatory School. Other children joined Higgs, some much younger, and Laurence's old nursery became a schoolroom where a Miss Tollit taught "the babies".

The school outgrew the three rooms in Cranford House, and more purpose-built classrooms were added to the existing building. The curriculum was expanded, with lessons taken outdoors as much as possible. New activities were included, such as horse riding lessons, piano and percussion, carpentry for the boys, and school outings. In 1937, the school produced its first play, A Market Square.

=== Second World War ===
During the Second World War, Laurence opened the school during the summer holidays so that all children, including evacuees, could enjoy games, bathing and other activities. Due to the rationing of petrol, children were rowed up the river to school or used a pony and trap.

=== 1945–1980 ===
By 1950, when pupil numbers had reached 136, Cranford House was renovated, and a swimming pool was added. In 1953, the adjacent Moulsford House was acquired, and some of the school moved across the road, becoming a dual site. Cranford House was granted official recognition following an inspection by the Department of Education and Science in 1955.

By 1961, the traffic volume through Moulsford made crossing the road dangerous. As a result, the school was relocated to its current site. A sister school to Cranford House was opened near Worthing in West Sussex the same year. Called Rustington House, it had the same uniform and syllabus as Cranford. At Cranford House, a gymnasium was built in 1967, and new activities were introduced, such as canoeing, rock climbing and national show-jumping competitions at Hickstead.

In 1969, Laurence retired. Miss Shine became headmistress until her retirement in 1980. Shine left a school of over 300 pupils, and her departure marked the establishment of a Charitable Trust under a Board of Governors.

=== 1980–present ===
Under the leadership of headmistress Miss Spencer, a new science block opened in 1985, the Barn was rebuilt in 1988, and additional tennis and netball courts were added in 1990. In 1992, the headmistress, Alison Gray, adopted a new curriculum and added extra-curricular activities. Recently, the school has developed its facilities to cope with the increase in pupil numbers and changes in the curriculum. A cover was added to the swimming pool, the third science block was built, the Orangery dining room, the Atrium/Library, an all-weather astroturf pitch and a modern sports hall in 2014.

2018 marked the opening of a renovated Junior School.

2020 saw a major re-branding of Cranford House, which included the addition of an on-site sixth form and refurbished creative and performing arts facilities. The school announced the move to a fully coeducational model, which started in September 2020, with boys entering the senior school in year 7 and the sixth form in year 12.

== Inspections ==
The school was inspected in 2014 by the Independent Schools Inspectorate and rated excellent in every category. It was inspected again in 2018 and met all standards.
