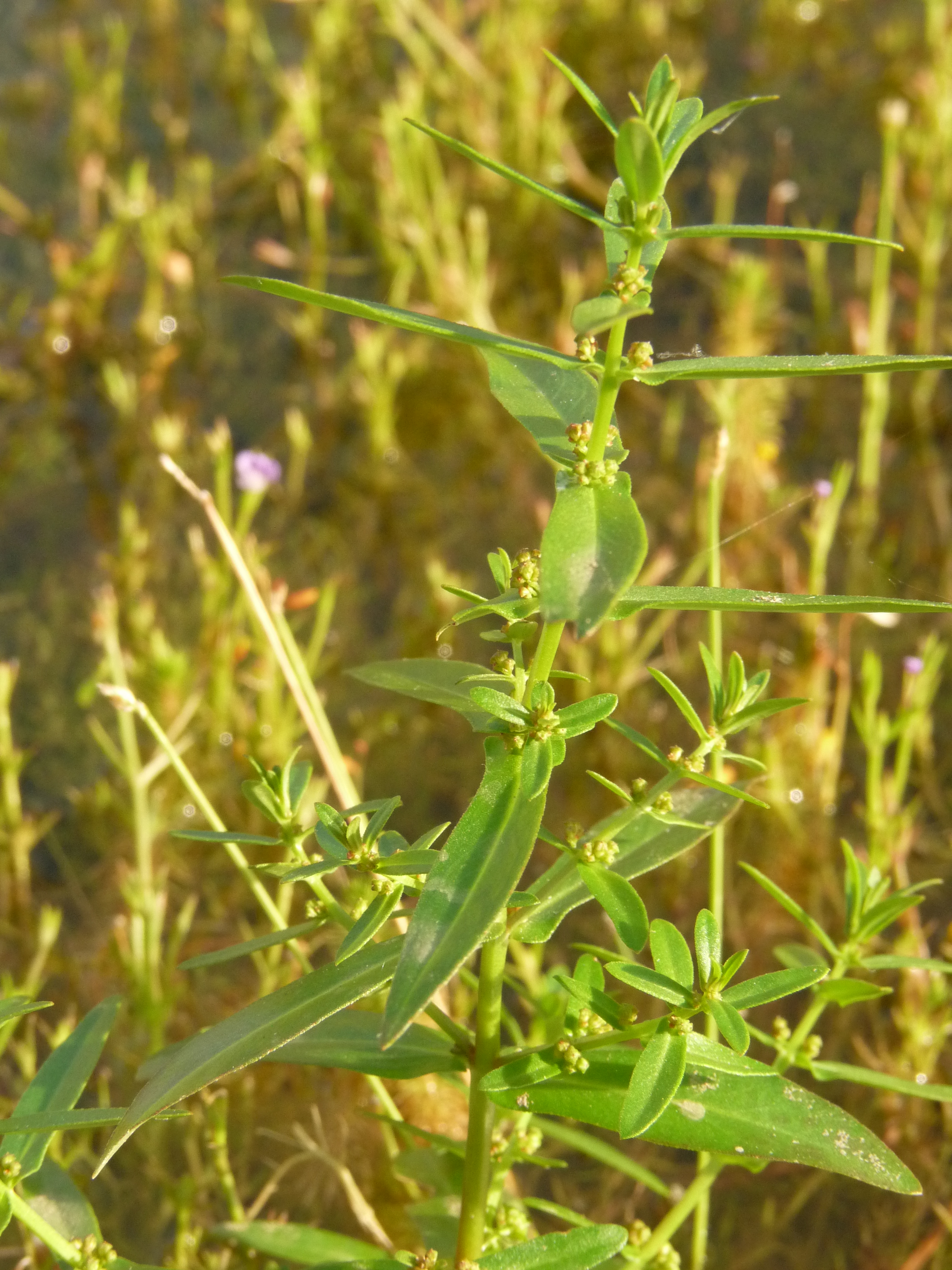

Conservation status
- Least Concern (IUCN 3.1)

Scientific classification
- Kingdom: Plantae
- Clade: Tracheophytes
- Clade: Angiosperms
- Clade: Eudicots
- Clade: Rosids
- Order: Myrtales
- Family: Lythraceae
- Genus: Ammannia
- Species: A. multiflora

Binomial name
- Ammannia multiflora Roxb.
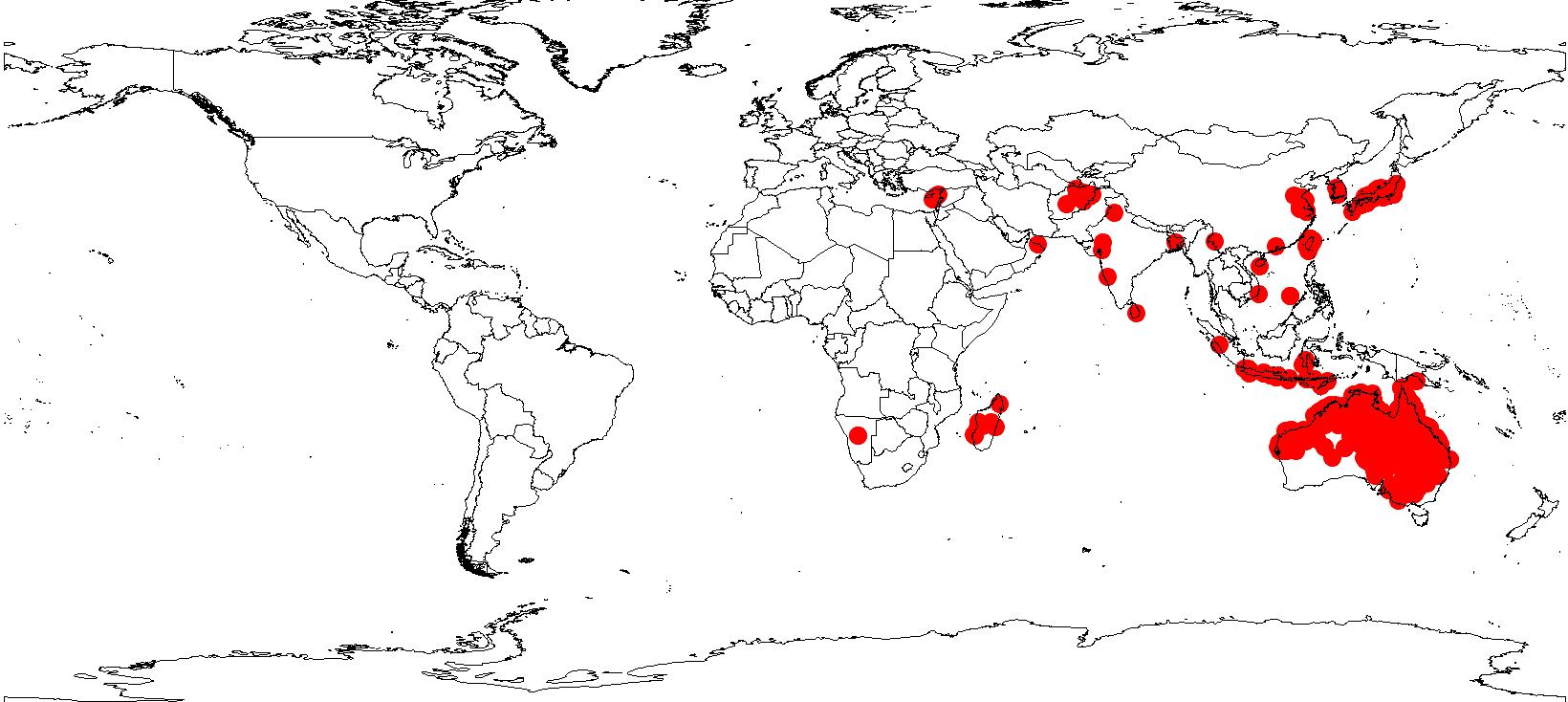
- Occurrence data from GBIF

= Ammannia multiflora =

Species of flowering plant

Ammannia multiflora, commonly known as many-flower ammannia and jerry-jerry in Victoria, is a species in the family Lythraceae. It is widespread in Asia, tropical and sub-tropical Africa and Australia. It can be found in shallow water and damp heavy soils.

== Description ==
Ammannia multiflora is an erect, branched herb which grows to a height of about 60 cm. The leaves are opposite, and without stalks (sessile). The leaf blade is oblong-linear to narrowly lanceolate or oblanceolate, and from 0.5 to 5 cm long, with a heart-shaped base. The inflorescences occur in short dense clusters. The sepals are triangular and about. 0.2 mm long, with the petals being about 0.5 to 1 mm long. There are 4 stamens. The capsule is globular and from 1.5 to 2.5 mm in diameter.

== Distribution ==
In Australia, it is found in Western Australia, the Northern Territory, South Australia, Queensland, New South Wales, and Victoria.

== Conservation status ==
While its conservation status under the IUCN redlist is of "least concern", in Victoria it is considered "vulnerable".

== Uses ==
In Australia, Aborigenes ground its seed and baked the resultant meal to make cakes.

== Gallery ==
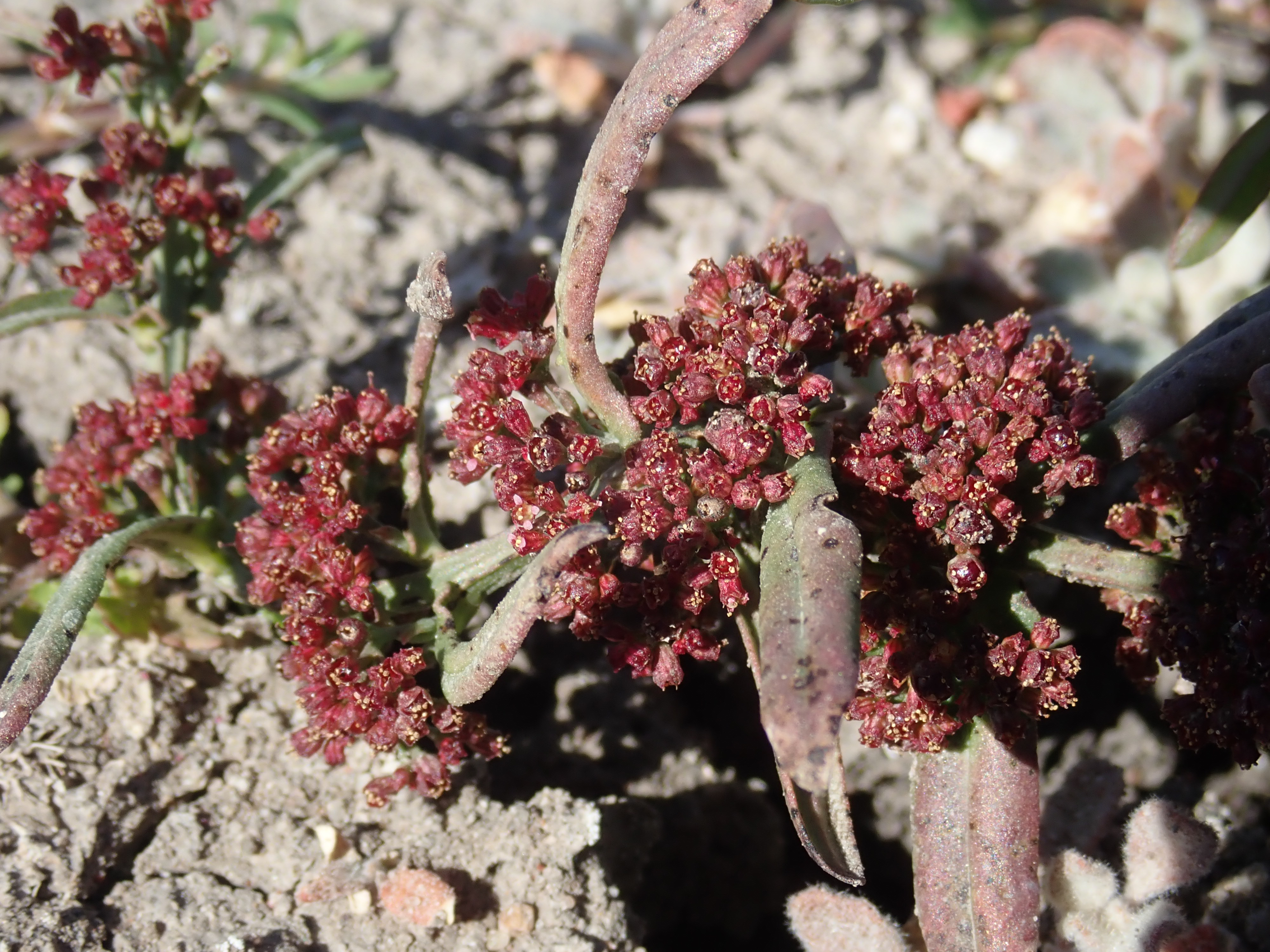

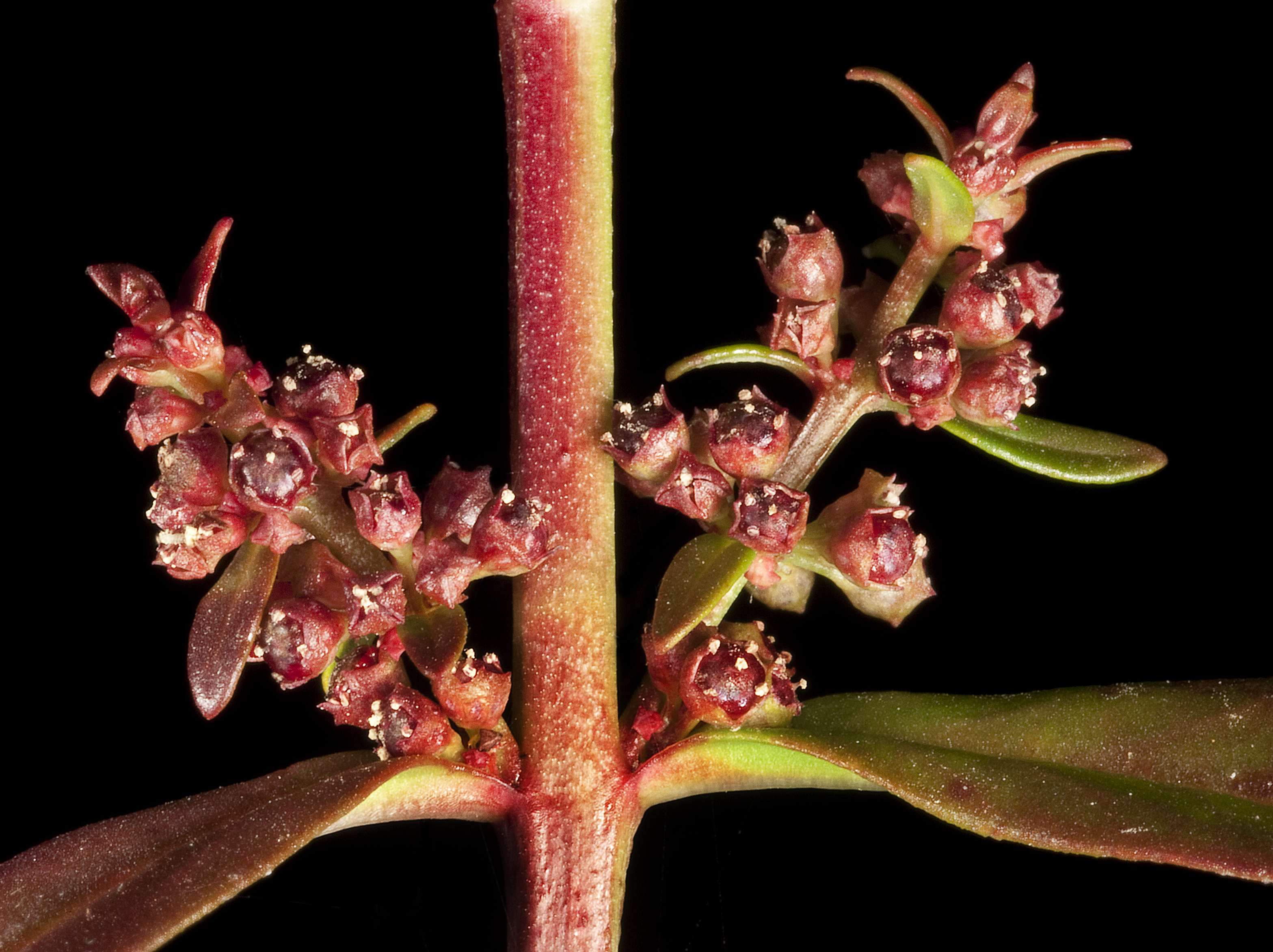

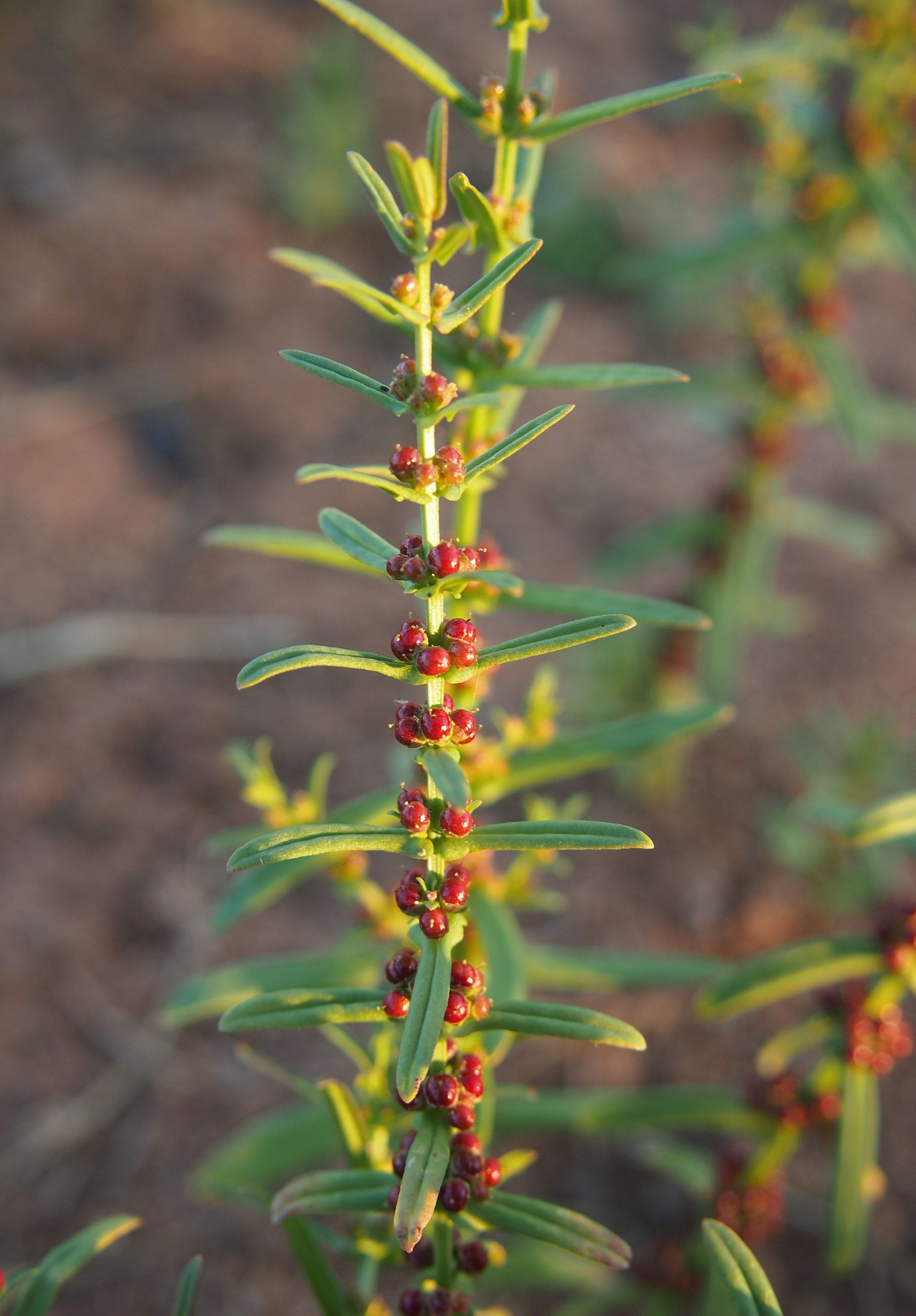

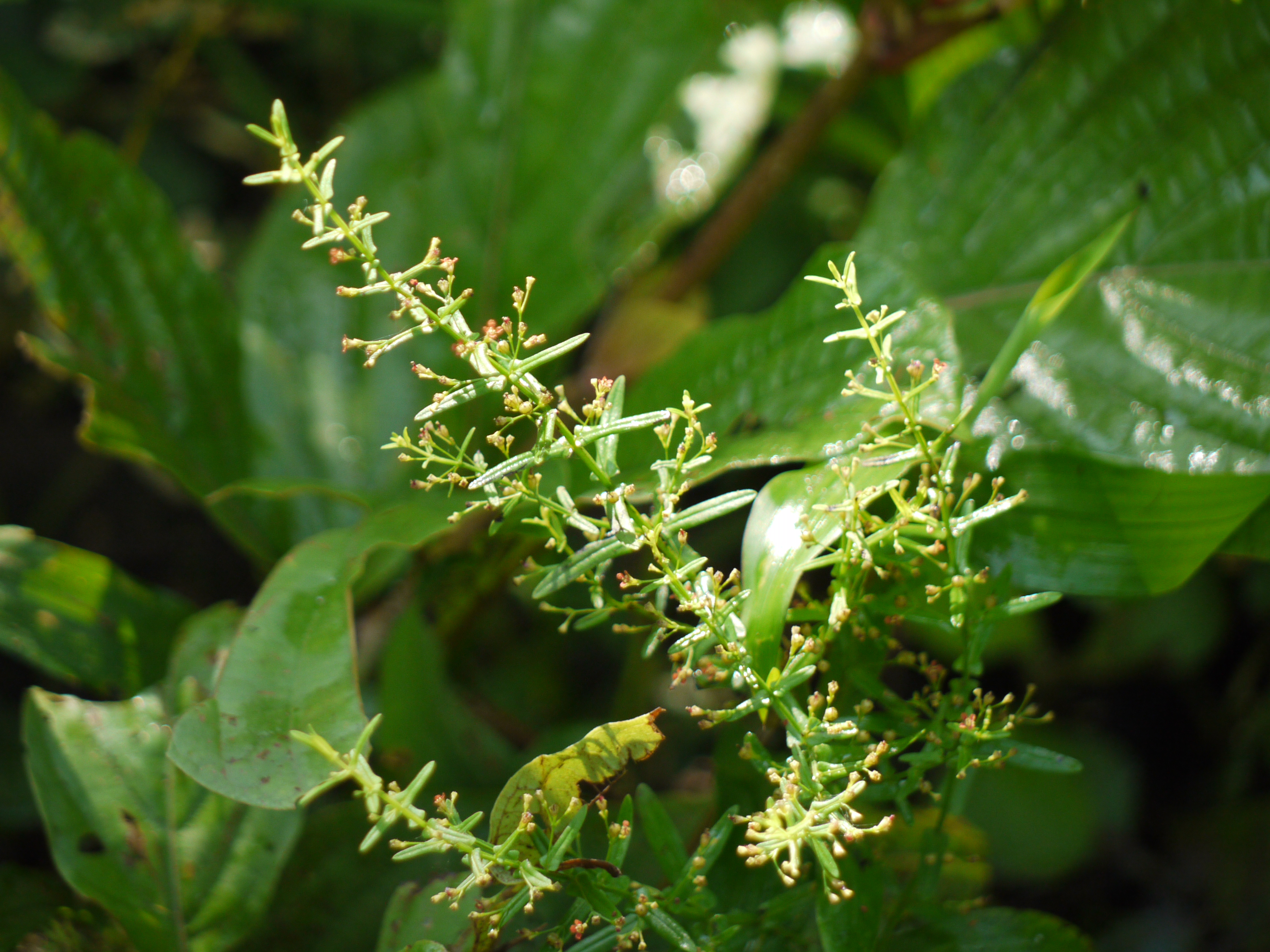
