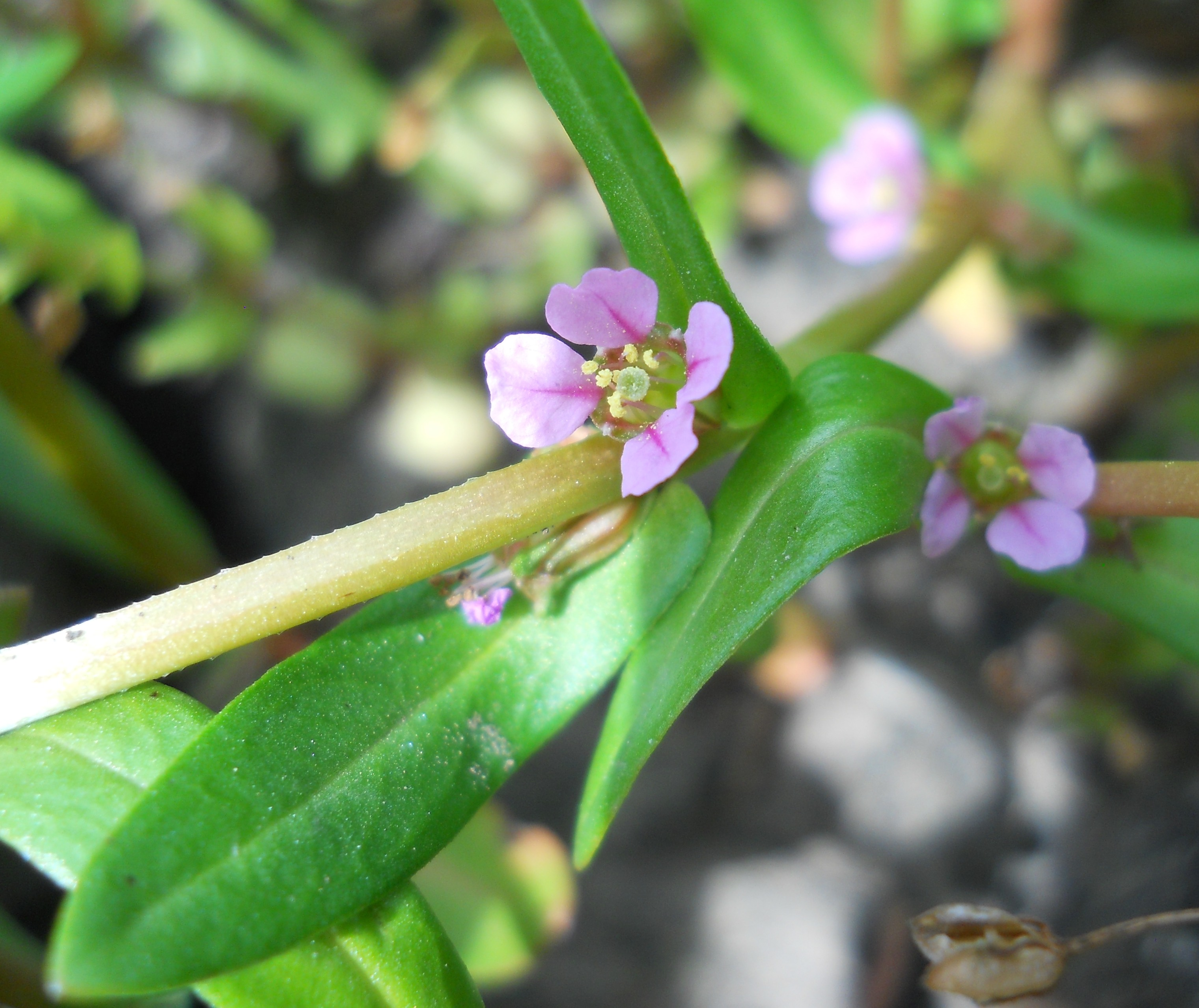

Conservation status
- Least Concern (IUCN 3.1)

Scientific classification
- Kingdom: Plantae
- Clade: Tracheophytes
- Clade: Angiosperms
- Clade: Eudicots
- Clade: Rosids
- Order: Myrtales
- Family: Lythraceae
- Genus: Ammannia
- Species: A. robusta

Binomial name
- Ammannia robusta Heer & Regel

Synonyms
- List: Ammannia alcalina Blank.; Ammannia coccinea subsp. robusta (Heer & Regel) Koehne; Ammannia sanguinolenta subsp. robusta (Heer & Regel) Koehne

= Ammannia robusta =

Plant species in the loosestrife family

Ammannia robusta is a species of flowering plant in the loosestrife family known by the common name grand redstem. It is widespread across much of North America (from British Columbia and Ontario to Guatemala) with additional populations in southeastern Brazil.

== Description ==
Ammannia robusta grows in moist places, such as ditches and pond margins. It is an annual herb reaching up to 100 cm in height when growing erect. The leaves are up to 8 cm (3 inches) long and linear to lance-shaped. The leaves and stem are green to red. The inflorescences are clusters of up to five flowers in the leaf axils. The flowers are urn-shaped with light lavender petals about 5 mm long and protruding stamens with yellow anthers. The fruit is a spherical capsule about 5 mm wide containing several tiny seeds.
