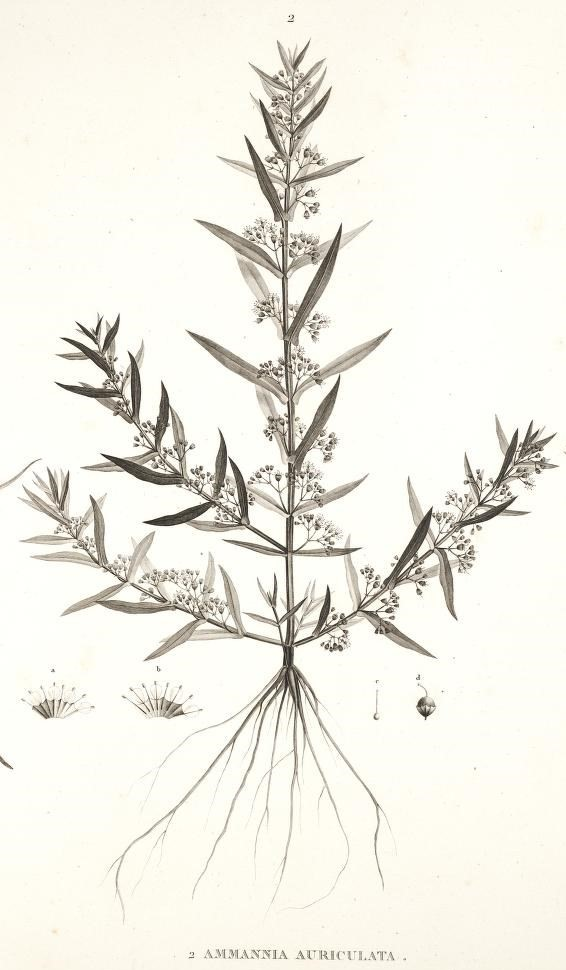

Conservation status
- Least Concern (IUCN 3.1)

Scientific classification
- Kingdom: Plantae
- Clade: Tracheophytes
- Clade: Angiosperms
- Clade: Eudicots
- Clade: Rosids
- Order: Myrtales
- Family: Lythraceae
- Genus: Ammannia
- Species: A. auriculata

Binomial name
- Ammannia auriculata Willd.

= Ammannia auriculata =

Species of flowering plant

Ammannia auriculata, commonly known as eared redstem, is a species in the family Lythraceae that is found in tropical and subtropicalt areas around much of the world.

The slender and erect herb typically grows to a height of 5 to 40 centimetres (2 to 16 in). It blooms in March producing orange-purple flowers.

In Australia the species is found along the swampy margins of streams in a few scattered areas of the Kimberley and Pilbara regions of Western Australia extending into the Northern Territory and Queensland where it grows in black loamy soils.

In the United States it is found in Alabama, Arizona, Louisiana, Texas, South Dakota, Nebraska, New Mexico and Mississippi. It is found through much of Central America, Southern Chine and parts of Asia.

It is commonly found as a weed in rice paddies and on damp disturbed areas of soil.
