= Beetle and Wedge =

Coordinates: 51.5484°N 1.1456°W

Beetle and Wedge Boathouse
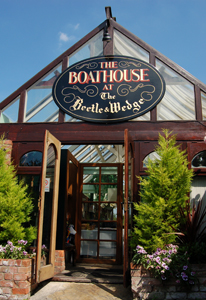
- The Beetle and Wedge Boathouse
- Interactive map of Beetle and Wedge Boathouse

Restaurant information
- Food type: Modern British
- Location: Moulsford, Oxfordshire, England

The Beetle and Wedge is a restaurant on the bank of the River Thames at Ferry Lane in Moulsford, Oxfordshire, England. The restaurant occupies the site of the former Moulsford ferry crossing and is housed in a historic riverside building that formerly served as a boathouse and trading inn.

The name derives from traditional woodworking tools: a beetle, a heavy wooden mallet, and a wedge, used together for splitting timber.

The site lies on a stretch of the Thames associated with Jerome K. Jerome's Three Men in a Boat and the river landscapes that inspired parts of Kenneth Grahame's The Wind in the Willows.

== History ==
The building dates from before 1860 and was historically associated with the Moulsford ferry service, which linked Oxfordshire and Berkshire across the Thames. The ferry remained in operation until 1967, when it ceased following the retirement of its final operator.

After the closure of the ferry, the boathouse was converted for hospitality use while retaining elements of its original structure, including the slipway to the river.

In 2005, the restaurant featured in filming for the BBC television adaptation Three Men in a Boat, presented by Griff Rhys Jones, Rory McGrath and Dara Ó Briain.

== Reception ==
The restaurant has received coverage in regional and national press for its riverside setting and modern British cuisine, and has been noted as a prominent dining destination on the upper Thames.

== See also ==
- Moulsford
- River Thames
- Three Men in a Boat
