= Bar screen =

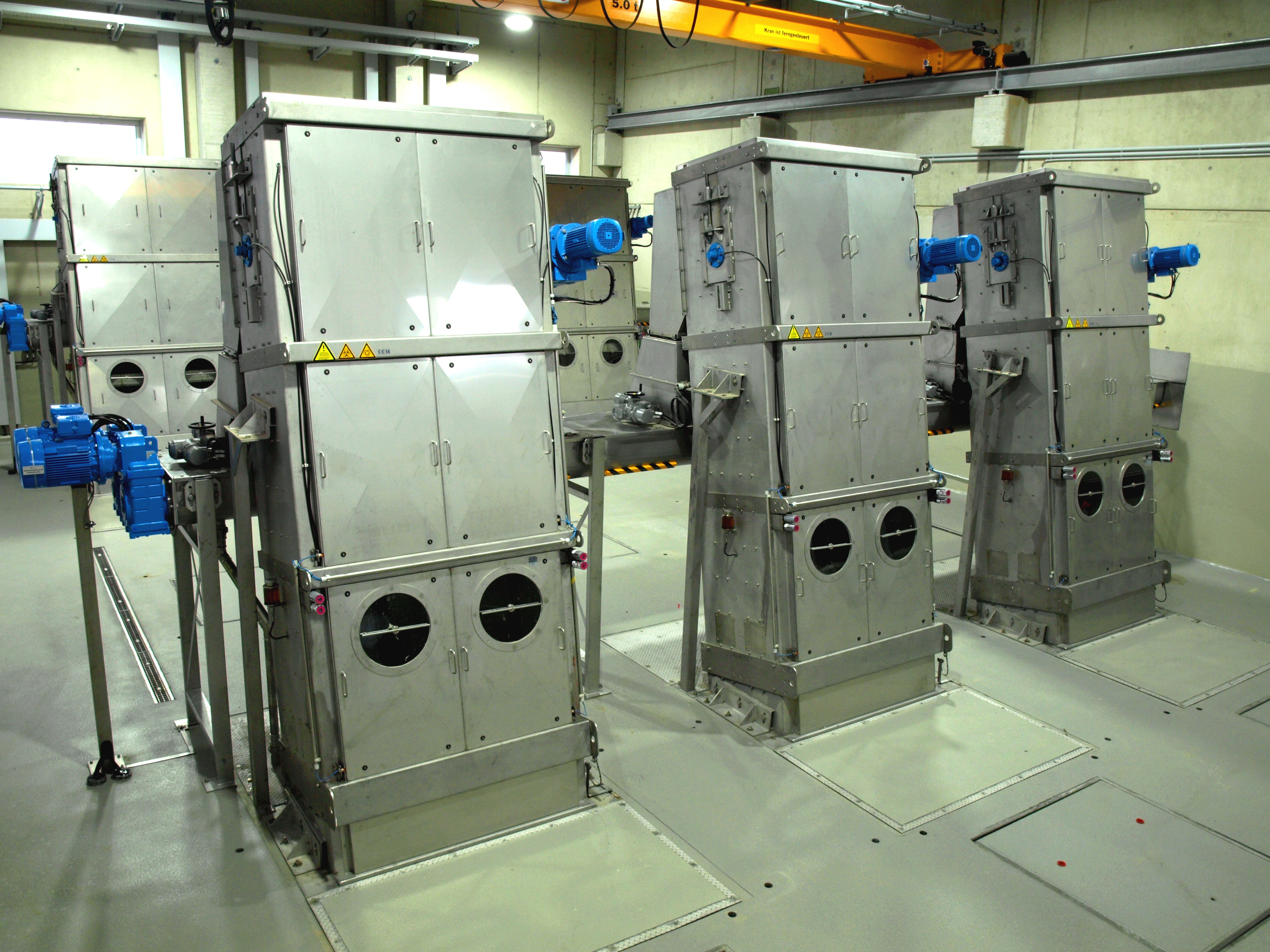
Bar screens in the WWTP Aachen-Soers, Germany

A bar screen is a mechanical filter used to remove large objects, such as rags and plastics, from wastewater. It is part of the primary filtration flow and typically is the first, or preliminary, level of filtration, being installed at the influent to a wastewater treatment plant. They typically consist of a series of vertical steel bars spaced between 1 and 3 inches apart.

Bar screens come in many designs. Some employ automatic cleaning mechanisms using electric motors and chains, some must be cleaned manually by means of a heavy rake. Items removed from the influent are called screenings and are collected in dumpsters and disposed of in landfills. As a bar screen collects objects, the water level will rise, and so they must be cleared regularly to prevent overflow.
