= New House, Wadhurst Park =

Grade I listed 20th century country house in Wadhurst, Sussex

New House
- Location within East Sussex
- 51.0354°N 0.3270°E
- Location: Wadhurst Park, Wadhurst, East Sussex

History
- Built: 1982–6
- Built for: Hans and Märit Rausing

Site notes
- Area: United Kingdom
- Architect: John Outram
- Architectural style: Postmodern

Listed Building – Grade I
- Official name: The New House, including orangery, Millennium Pavilion, terraces and all hard landscaping
- Designated: 2 July 2020
- Reference no.: 1457638

The New House, Wadhurst Park, Wadhurst is a Postmodernist country house in East Sussex, England. It was commissioned by Hans Rausing and his wife, Märit, and designed by John Outram. Built between 1982 and 1986, the house was designated a Grade I listed building in 2020.

== History ==
The Rausing family fortune was established by Ruben Rausing, a Swedish industrialist and the founder of Tetra Pak, a liquid packaging company. From the 1950s, the company saw enormous expansion under the direction of Rausing's sons, Hans and Gad. Hans moved to the United Kingdom in the 1980s to avoid Swedish taxation and sold his share in Tetra Pak to his brother in the 1990s. Hans had previously bought the Wadhurst Park estate in East Sussex, in 1975 and this subsequently became his main residence. The original house at Wadhurst, a Victorian mansion, had been demolished in 1952.

In the 1980s Rausing and his wife, Märit, commissioned John Outram to design them a new country house. (Note: A history of the house's design and construction, by the architectural historian Jeremy Musson, was published in 2010.) Historic England considers the result Outram's most important building in England, "an exceptionally unusual example of a Post-Modern country house". Hans Rausing died in 2019. The house remains a private residence of the Rausing family.

== Architecture and description ==
In a Postmodernist design, Outram later described the house as "built like a Factory and finished like a Palace". (Note: Outram reportedly dislikes the term "Postmodernist", preferring to describe his work as "popular classicism".) The single-storey building forms a series of pavilions, in a rough H-plan, set around the Victorian orangery. The exterior is faced in a variety of materials, including Outram's 'blitzcrete', a blend of crushed brick and concrete, while the interior is decorated with stone and rare woods. Outram frequently returned to Wadhurst to design additions to the house, including an outdoor-dining pavilion built in 2000 to commemorate the Millennium, and the redesign and roofing of the Victorian orangery to create a ballroom in celebration of the Rausing's 50th wedding anniversary. In 2020, the New House was designated a Grade I listed building.

== Sources ==
- Lawson, Bryan (1994). Design in Mind. Oxford: Butterworth Architecture. ISBN 978-0-750-61211-1. OCLC 30079515.
