= William Houstoun (botanist) =

William Houstoun (occasionally spelt Houston) (1695?–1733) was a Scottish surgeon and botanist who collected plants in the West Indies, New Spain and South America.

Houstoun was born in Houston, Renfrewshire. He began a degree course in medicine at St Andrew's University but interrupted his studies to visit the West Indies, returning circa 1727. On 6 October 1727, he entered the University of Leyden to continue his studies under Boerhaave, graduating M.D. in 1729. It was during his time at Leyden that Houstoun became interested in the medicinal properties of plants. After returning to England that year, he soon sailed for the Caribbean and the Americas employed as a ship's surgeon for the South Sea Company. He collected plants in Jamaica, Cuba, Venezuela, and Vera Cruz, despatching seeds and plants to Philip Miller, head gardener at the Chelsea Physic Garden in London. Notable among these plants was Dorstenia contrayerva, a reputed cure for snake-bite, and Buddleja americana, the latter named by Linnaeus, at Houstoun's request, for the English cleric and botanist Adam Buddle, although Buddle could have known nothing of the plant as he had died in 1715. Houstoun published accounts of his studies in Catalogus plantarum horti regii Parisiensis.

When Houstoun returned to London in 1731, he was introduced to Sir Hans Sloane by Miller. Sloane commissioned him to undertake a three-year expedition, financed by the trustees for the Province of Georgia 'for improving botany and agriculture in Georgia', and to help stock the Trustee's Garden planned for Savannah. Houstoun initially sailed to the Madeira Islands to gather grape plantings before continuing his voyage across the Atlantic. However he never completed his mission as he 'died from the heat' on 14 August 1733 soon after arriving in Jamaica; he was buried at Kingston. Houstoun was elected a Fellow of the Royal Society in January 1733.

== Legacy ==
Houstoun's writings and plant specimens, now preserved in the botanical department of the British Museum, passed from Miller to Sir Joseph Banks, by whom the manuscripts were published as Reliquiae Houstounianae in 1781.

== Eponymy ==
The genus Houstonia was named for him by Gronovius, and adopted by Linnaeus.
