= John Outram =

British architect (born 1934)

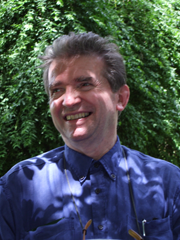
- Outram in 2009
- Born: 21 June 1934 (age 92); Taiping, British Malaya
- Occupation: Architect
- Practice: John Outram Associates
- Buildings: New House, Wadhurst Park; Isle of Dogs Pumping Station; Cambridge Judge Business School; Duncan Hall, Rice University; Sphinx Hill, Oxfordshire

John Outram (born 21 June 1934) is a British architect. He established a practice in London in 1974 and produced a series of buildings with an emphasis on polychromy and Classical allusions. Among his works are the Isle of Dogs Pumping Station in London (1985–88), the New House in Wadhurst Park, Sussex (1978–86), the Cambridge Judge Business School in Cambridge (1995), and the Computational Engineering Building (Duncan Hall), Rice University, Houston, Texas (1997).

== The New House, Wadhurst Park, 1986 ==
The New House, Wadhurst Park in East Sussex was completed in 1986 for Hans Rausing. It was described by a British critic as "probably the best house built since the war. It is inspired by classical proportions, yet is absolutely original." In 1999–2000 he added a Millennium Verandah to the house, featuring columns inspired by Indian, Sumerian, and other cultures.

It was Grade I listed in 2020.

== Isle of Dogs Pumping Station, 1988 ==
In the mid 1980s, the London Docklands Development Corporation awarded contracts for three storm-water pumping stations to Richard Rogers, Nicholas Grimshaw, and Outram. The buildings are unoccupied and secure. Outram designed the Isle of Dogs Pumping Station, a "monumental temple" with which he hoped to situate the viewer "within a Landscape of Symbols". The pumping station was listed at Grade II* in 2017. This was the first listing as a result of Historic England’s Post-Modernism project. The announcement was made to coincide with the London Festival of Architecture.

== Cambridge Judge Business School, 1995 ==
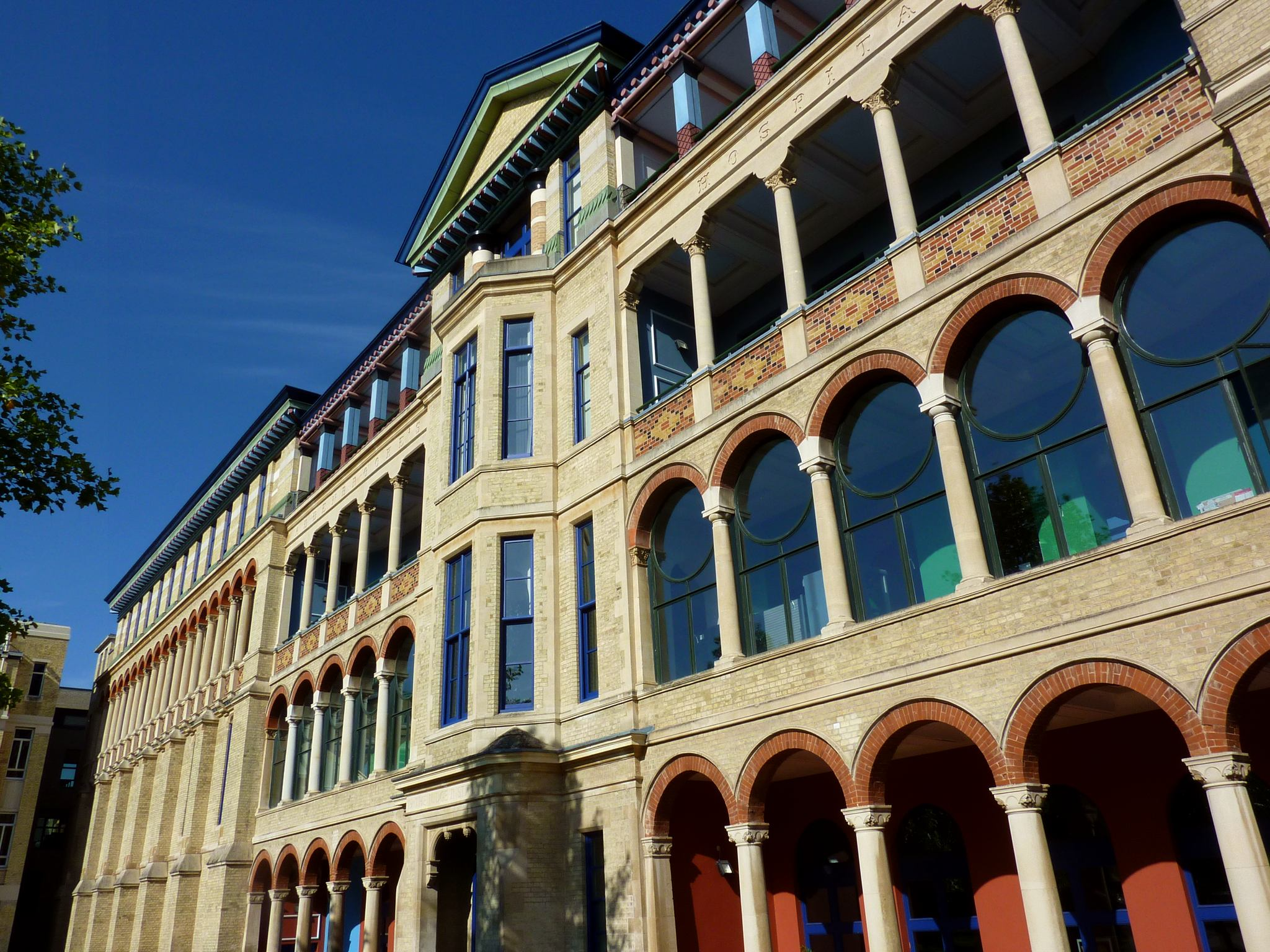
Judge Business School, University of Cambridge

The extensions and re-organization of Digby Wyatt's Addenbrooke's Old Hospital as the Judge Institute of Management Studies (now called the Cambridge Judge Business School), Cambridge (1993–95), combines the language of Classical architecture with the engineering components necessary in a modern building.

Services, along with access ladders, were placed inside hollow pillars and incorporated within what Outram has called the ‘Robot Order’ (Ordine Robotico). One critic described this as "the invention of a Sixth Order, an act of sheer Architectural terrorism', and by another as "...a collection of places, at once archaic and hypermodern", neither exposed nor hidden away, but used to validate a new architectural order visible throughout the building as the columns and beams large enough to contain the mechanisms needed by Modernity. The reason for this novel re-invention of the "tabooed" Architectural Order was to restore to Architecture the "literate decorum" that was also placed under a taboo after WWII.

== Duncan Hall, Rice University, 1997 ==
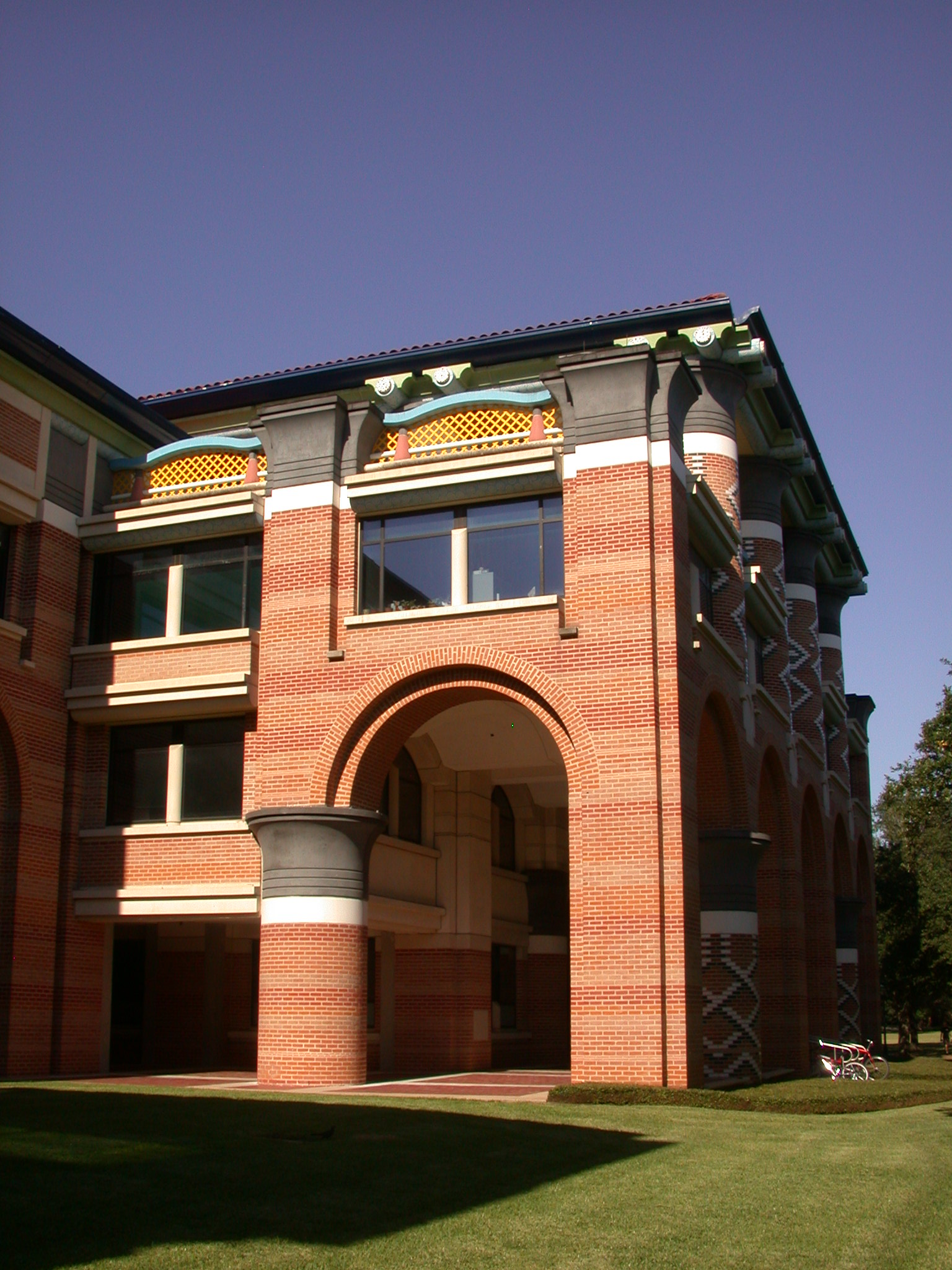
Duncan Hall, Rice University

Outram designed the new building for the Computational Engineering department at Rice University in Houston, Texas, named Anne and Charles Duncan Hall in honor of outgoing Chair of the University Board of Directors Charles Duncan, Jr. When completed, it was the largest new building on this 100-year-old Campus. It stands next to its oldest building, "one of Houston's most revered architectural monuments."

== Other buildings ==
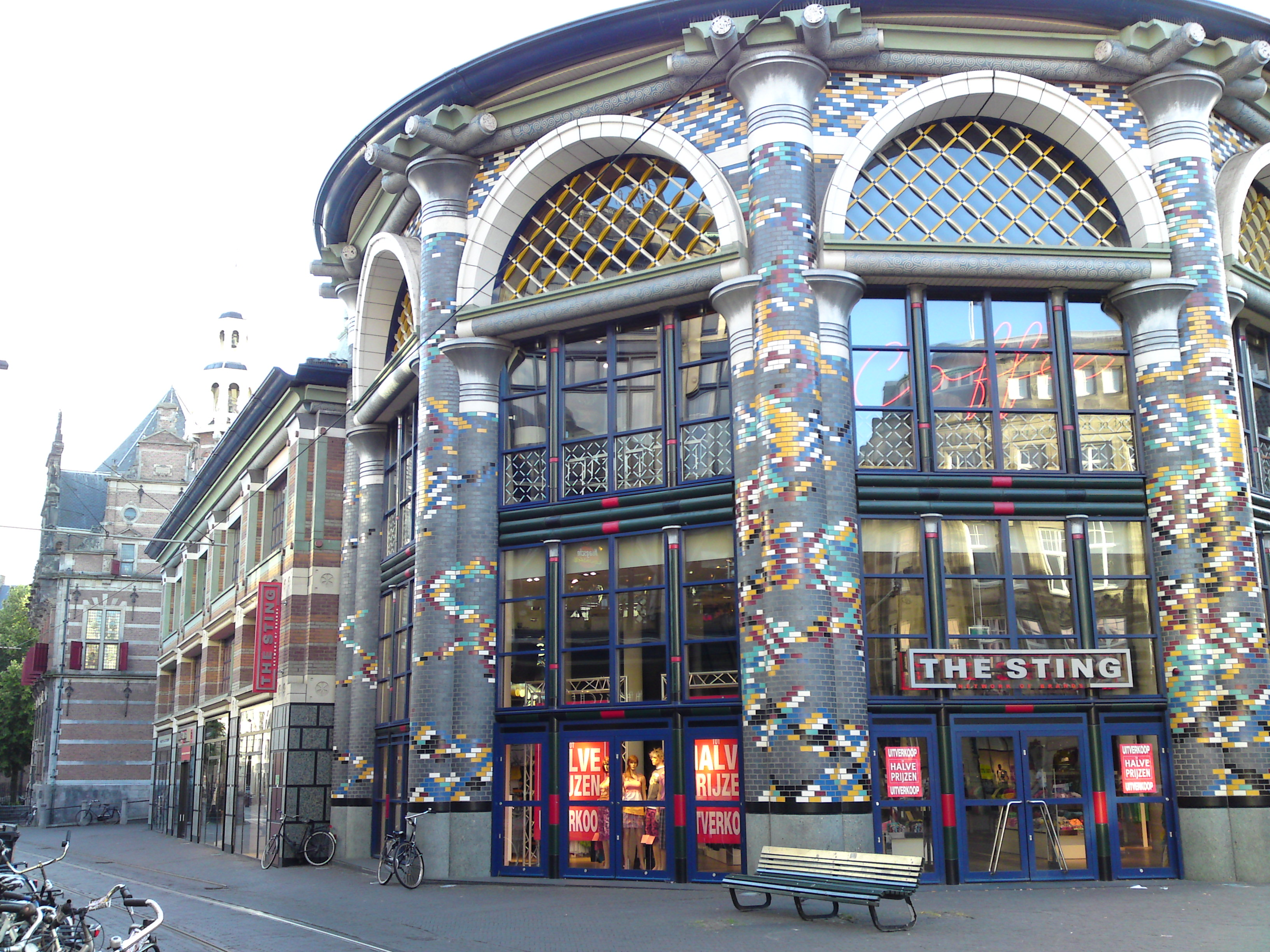
The Old Town Hall, The Hague

Other buildings include Sphinx Hill in Oxfordshire (1999), Craft Workshops, Welbeck Abbey, Nottinghamshire (2000), and a retail development at the Old Town Hall, The Hague, The Netherlands (2000), in which Egyptianizing, Classical, and other historical references are "treated with verve and imagination"

National Life Stories conducted an oral history interview (C467/86) with John Outram in 2007 for its Architects Lives' collection held by the British Library.
