= Lourtella =

Scientific classification
- Kingdom: Plantae
- Clade: Tracheophytes
- Clade: Angiosperms
- Clade: Eudicots
- Clade: Rosids
- Order: Myrtales
- Family: Lythraceae
- Genus: Lourtella; S.A.Graham, Baas & Tobe
- Species: L. resinosa

Binomial name
- Lourtella resinosa S.A.Graham, Baas & Tobe

Species of flowering plant

Lourtella is a monotypic genus of flowering plants belonging to the family Lythraceae. The only species is Lourtella resinosa S.A.Graham, Baas & Tobe.

It is native to Peru and Bolivia.

The genus name of Lourtella is in honour of Alicia Lourteig (1913–2003), an Argentine and French botanist, who was a world specialist in Oxalidaceae plants. The Latin specific epithet of resinosa refers to resinous, from resina. Both genus and species were first described and published in Syst. Bot. Vol.12 on pages 519-520 in 1987.

Lourtella is allied to a botanical cluster of four other genera: Adenaria, Koehneria, Pehria, and Woodfordia.

It is unique within this cluster because it has secretory ducts, which help identify it.
