= Kingwood (wood) =

Type of wood

A chess piece (queen) made from kingwood.

Kingwood is a classic furniture wood, almost exclusively used for inlays on very fine furniture. It was the most expensive wood in general use for furniture making in the seventeenth century, at which time it was known as princes wood. It is brownish-purple with many fine darker stripes and occasional irregular swirls. Occasionally it contains pale streaks of a similar colour to the sapwood, as in the picture.

It is yielded by a smallish tree, Dalbergia cearensis, restricted to a small area in Brazil. Other woods from the same genus are cocobolo, rosewood, African blackwood, Bombay blackwood and Brazilian tulipwood. The wood is very dense and hard, and can be brought to a spectacular finish. It turns well, but due to its density and hardness it can be difficult to work with hand tools. It also has a tendency to blunt tools due to its abrasive properties.

It is available only in small sizes. Occasionally it is used in the solid for small items and turned work, including parts of billiard cues, e.g., those made by John Parris.

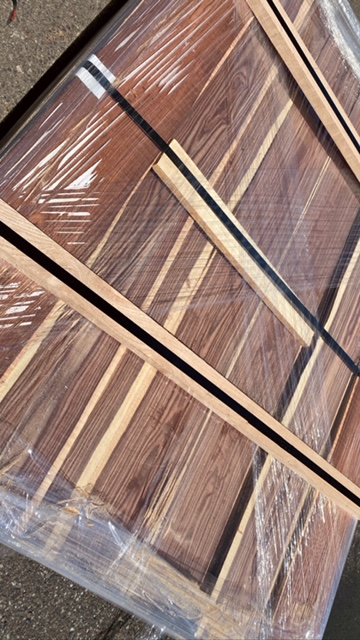
8/4 Brazilian Kingwood lumber
