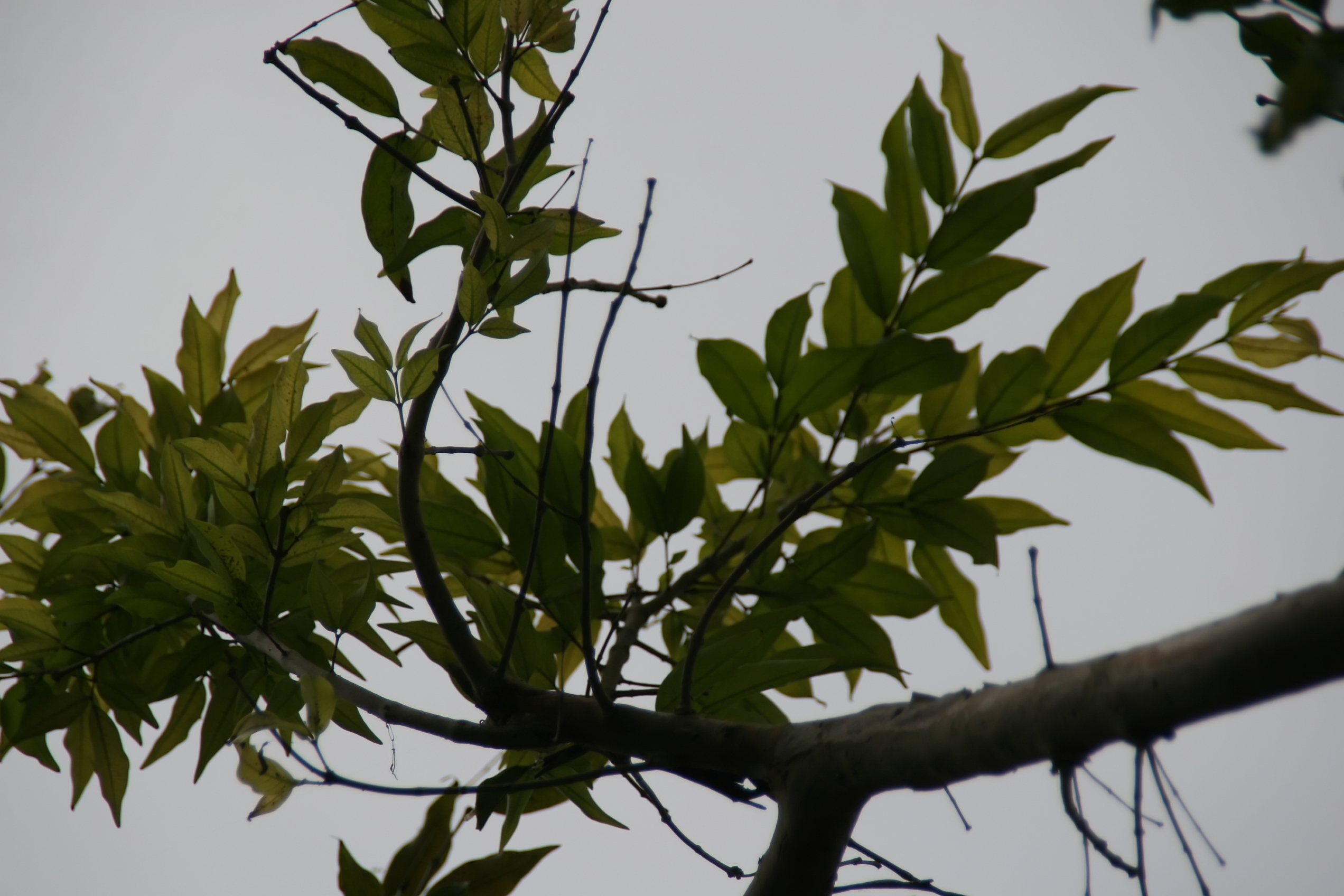

Conservation status
- Least Concern (IUCN 3.1)

Scientific classification
- Kingdom: Plantae
- Clade: Tracheophytes
- Clade: Angiosperms
- Clade: Eudicots
- Clade: Rosids
- Order: Myrtales
- Family: Lythraceae
- Genus: Ginoria
- Species: G. nudiflora

Binomial name
- Ginoria nudiflora (Hemsl.) Koehne

Synonyms
- Antherylium nudiflorum Hemsl.; Ginoria davisii M.C.Johnst.

= Ginoria nudiflora =

Species of flowering plant

Ginoria nudiflora is a species of flowering plant in the family Lythraceae. It is endemic to Mexico.
