= Tulipwood =

Type of wood

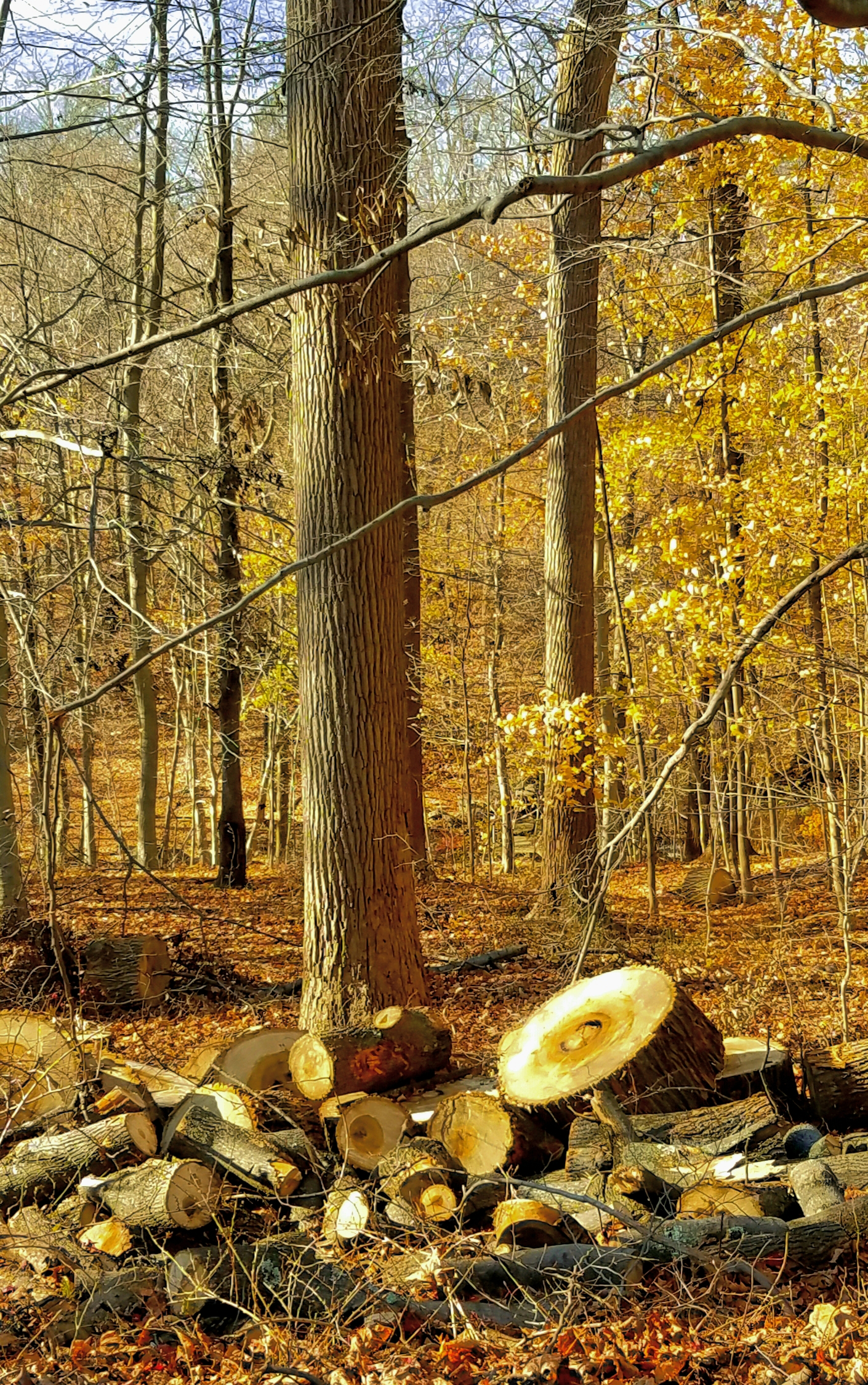
Cut wood of a tulip tree in a park in Westchester County, New York

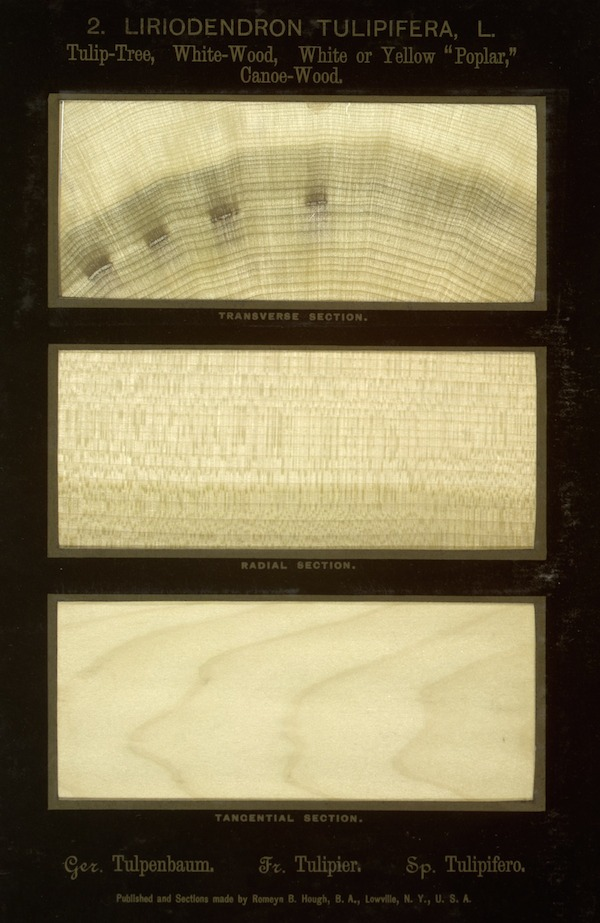
North American tulipwood (Liriodendron tulipifera)

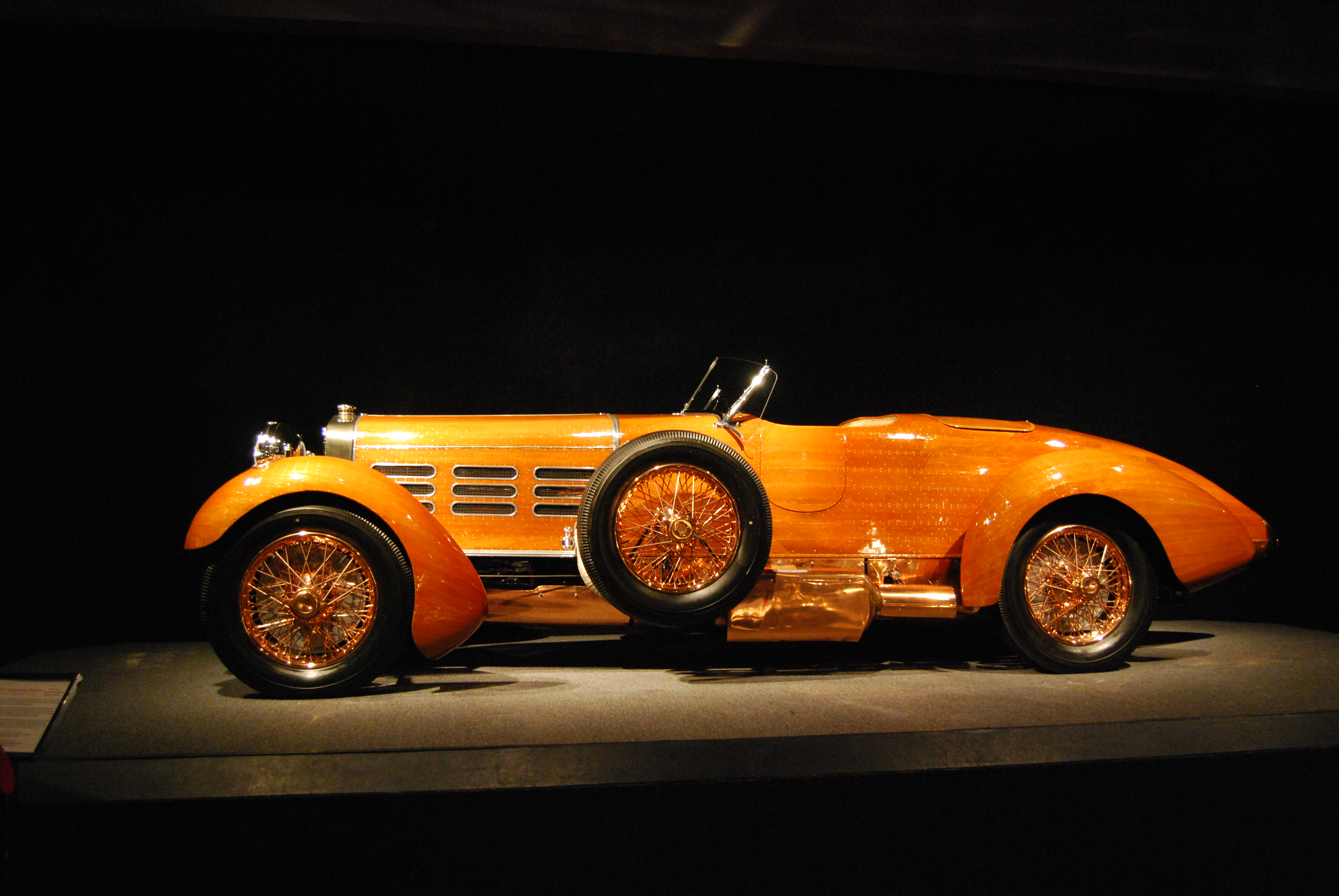
Hispano-Suiza H6 1924 tulipwood

Most commonly, tulipwood is the greenish yellowish wood yielded from the tulip tree, found on the Eastern side of North America and a similar species is found in some parts of China. In the United States, it is commonly known as tulip poplar or yellow poplar, even though the tree is not related to the poplars. It is notable for its height, which can exceed 190 feet. The wood is very light, around 490 kg per cubic meter, but very strong and is used in many applications, including furniture, joinery and moldings. It can also be stained very easily and is often used as a low-cost alternative to walnut and cherry in furniture and doors.

== Other types ==
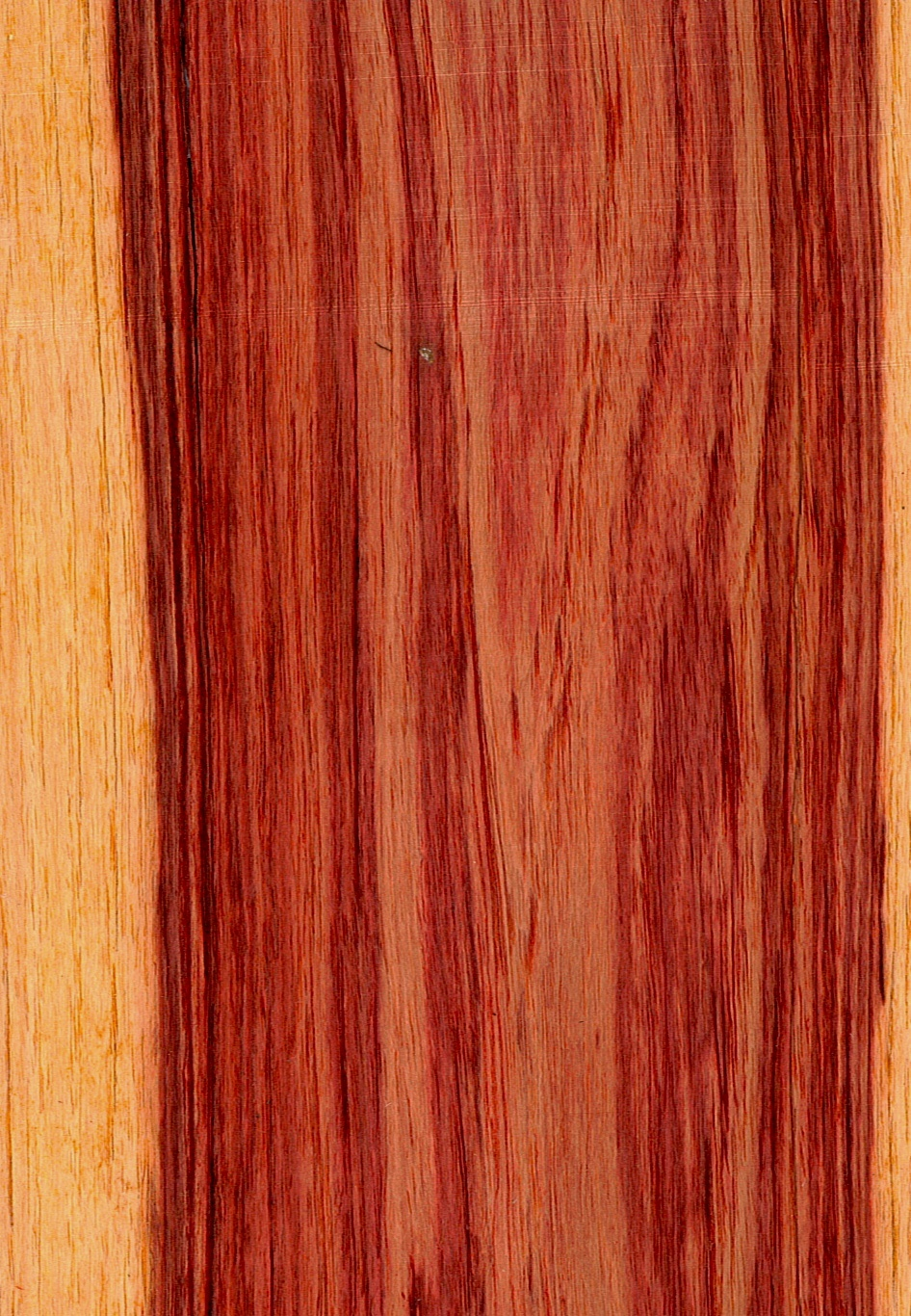
Brazilian tulipwood from Dalbergia decipularis

=== Brazilian ===
Brazilian tulipwood is a different species. A classic high-quality wood, it is very dense with a lovely figure. It is used for inlays in furniture and for small turned items. Available only in small sizes, it is rarely used in the solid for luxury furniture. Like other woods with a pronounced figure it is rather strongly subject to fashion.

In the nineteenth century Brazilian tulipwood was thought to be the product of the brazilian rosewood Physocalymma scaberrimum (West Indian tulipwood), but in the twentieth century it became clear it was yielded by a species of Dalbergia. At some point it was misidentified as Dalbergia frutescens, a misidentification which can still be found in books aimed at the woodworker. For some decades it has been known to be yielded by Dalbergia decipularis, a species restricted to a small area in Western-Brazil. But both Dalbergia fructescens and Dalbergia decipularis are named (Brazilian tulipwood). Also Dalbergia cearensis kingwood or violetwood, is named tulipwood and Dalbergia oliveri the burmese rosewood is sometimes called "burma tulipwood".

=== American tulipwood ===
The cheap, soft and pale wood from the tuliptree Liriodendron tulipifera is known as American tulipwood or poplar and American whitewood, canary whitewood and canary wood, it is widely used.

=== Australian ===
There also exists the "australian tulipwood", "tulipwood trees" the common name of Harpullia, Harpullia pendula (Black or Queensland, Moreton Bay tulipwood) and Harpullia arborea (Cooktown tulipwood) or Harpullia hillii (Blunt leaf tulipwood) and Harpullia alata (Wing-leaved tulipwood) etc. Certain varieties of Harpullia were prized for their dark coloured timber. The one most commonly known to horticulture is Harpullia pendula which is widely planted as a street tree along the east coast of Australia. Also Drypetes acuminata and Drypetes deplanchei (Yellow tulipwood) and New England tulipwood Guilfoylia monostylis are from Australia.

=== Others ===
Also exists the tuliptrees, Thespesia populnea and Thespesia acutiloba, Spathodea campanulata, Stenocarpus sinuatus, and Licaria guianensis, Dicypellium caryophyllatum and Hibiscus elatus, these trees resp. their wood is also occasionally named tulipwood.
