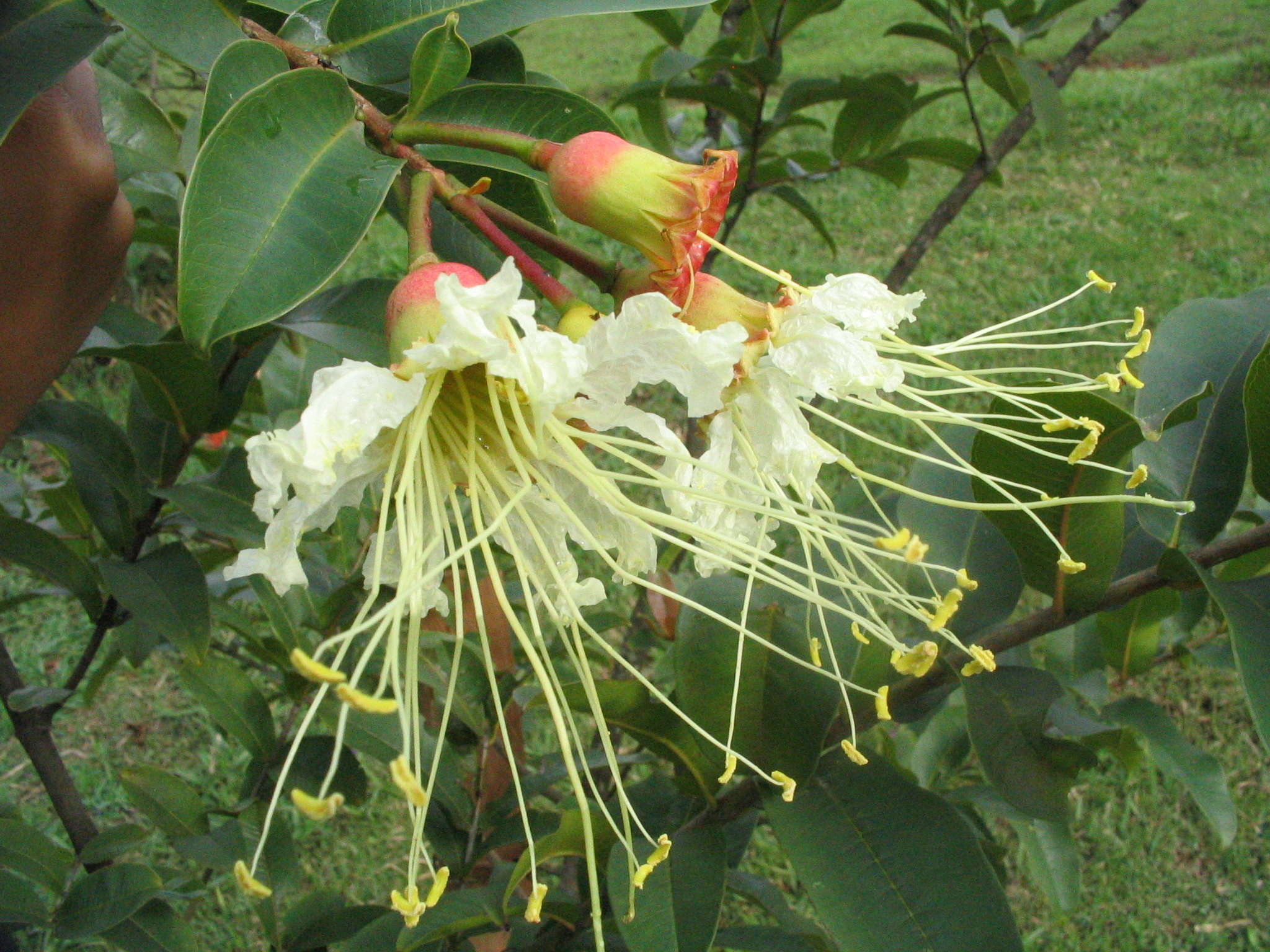

Conservation status
- Least Concern (IUCN 2.3)

Scientific classification
- Kingdom: Plantae
- Clade: Tracheophytes
- Clade: Angiosperms
- Clade: Eudicots
- Clade: Rosids
- Order: Myrtales
- Family: Lythraceae
- Genus: Lafoensia
- Species: L. pacari

Binomial name
- Lafoensia pacari A.St.-Hil.

= Lafoensia pacari =

Species of flowering plant

Lafoensia pacari is a species of plant in the family Lythraceae. It is found in Brazil and Paraguay.

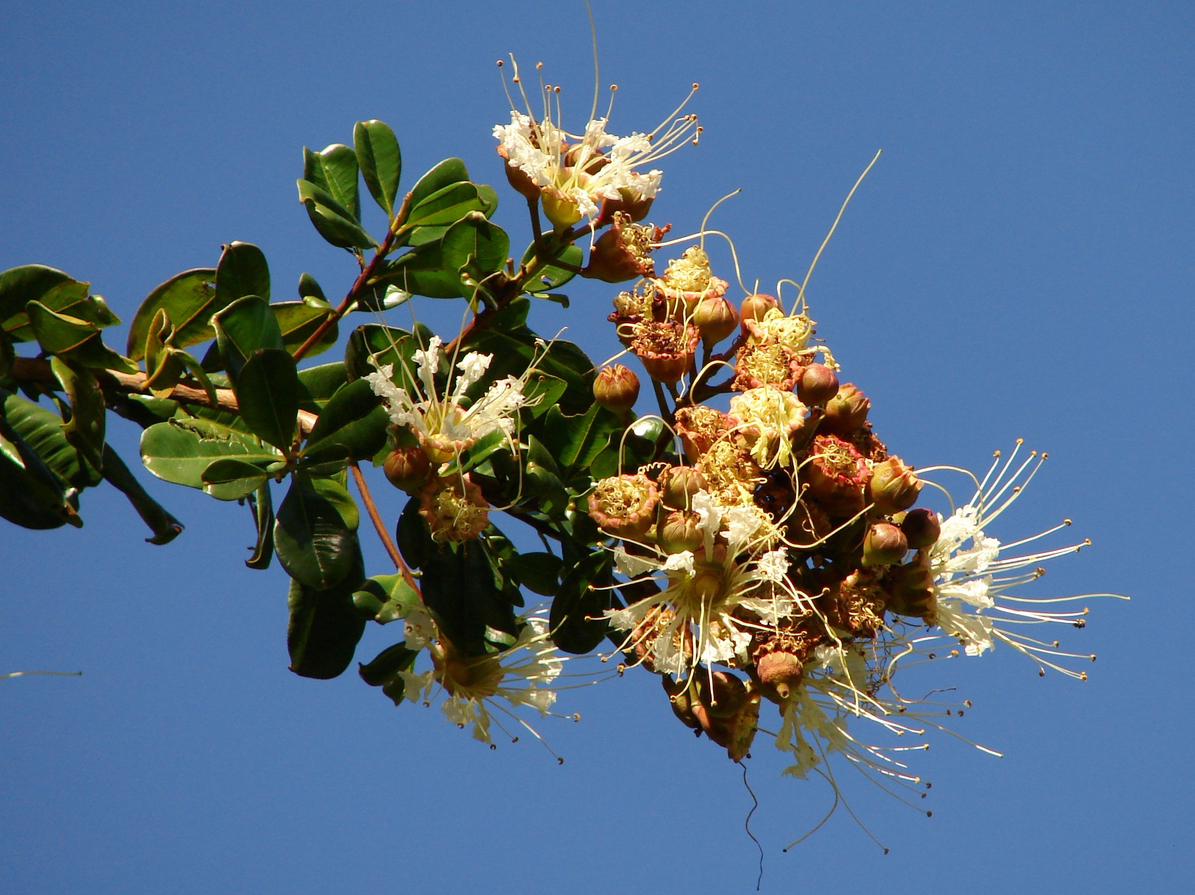
Lafoensia_pacari
