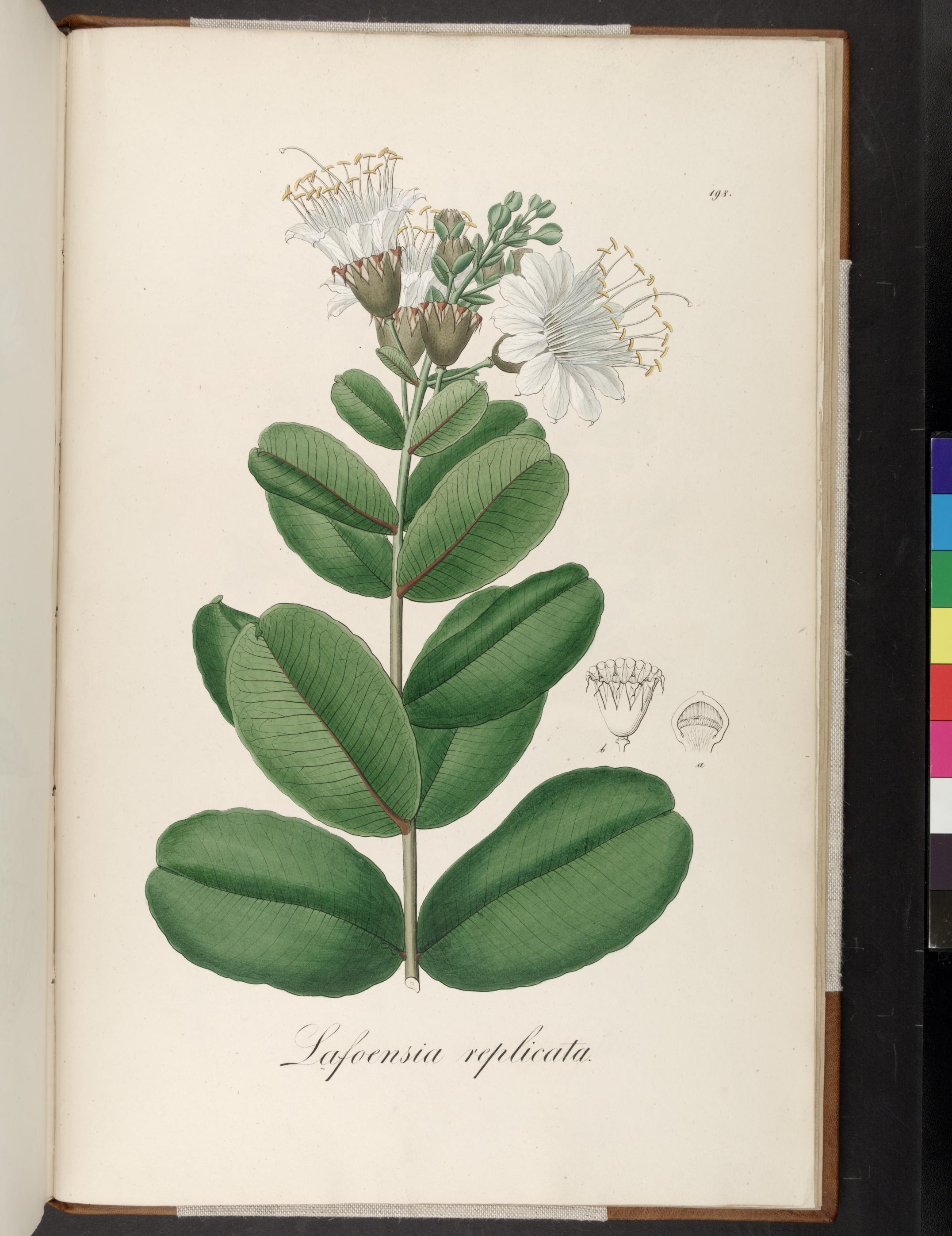
- Lafoensia replicata plate.

Conservation status
- Vulnerable (IUCN 2.3)

Scientific classification
- Kingdom: Plantae
- Clade: Tracheophytes
- Clade: Angiosperms
- Clade: Eudicots
- Clade: Rosids
- Order: Myrtales
- Family: Lythraceae
- Genus: Lafoensia
- Species: L. replicata

Binomial name
- Lafoensia replicata Pohl

= Lafoensia replicata =

Species of flowering plant

Lafoensia replicata is a species of plant in the family Lythraceae. It is endemic to Brazil. It is threatened by habitat loss.
