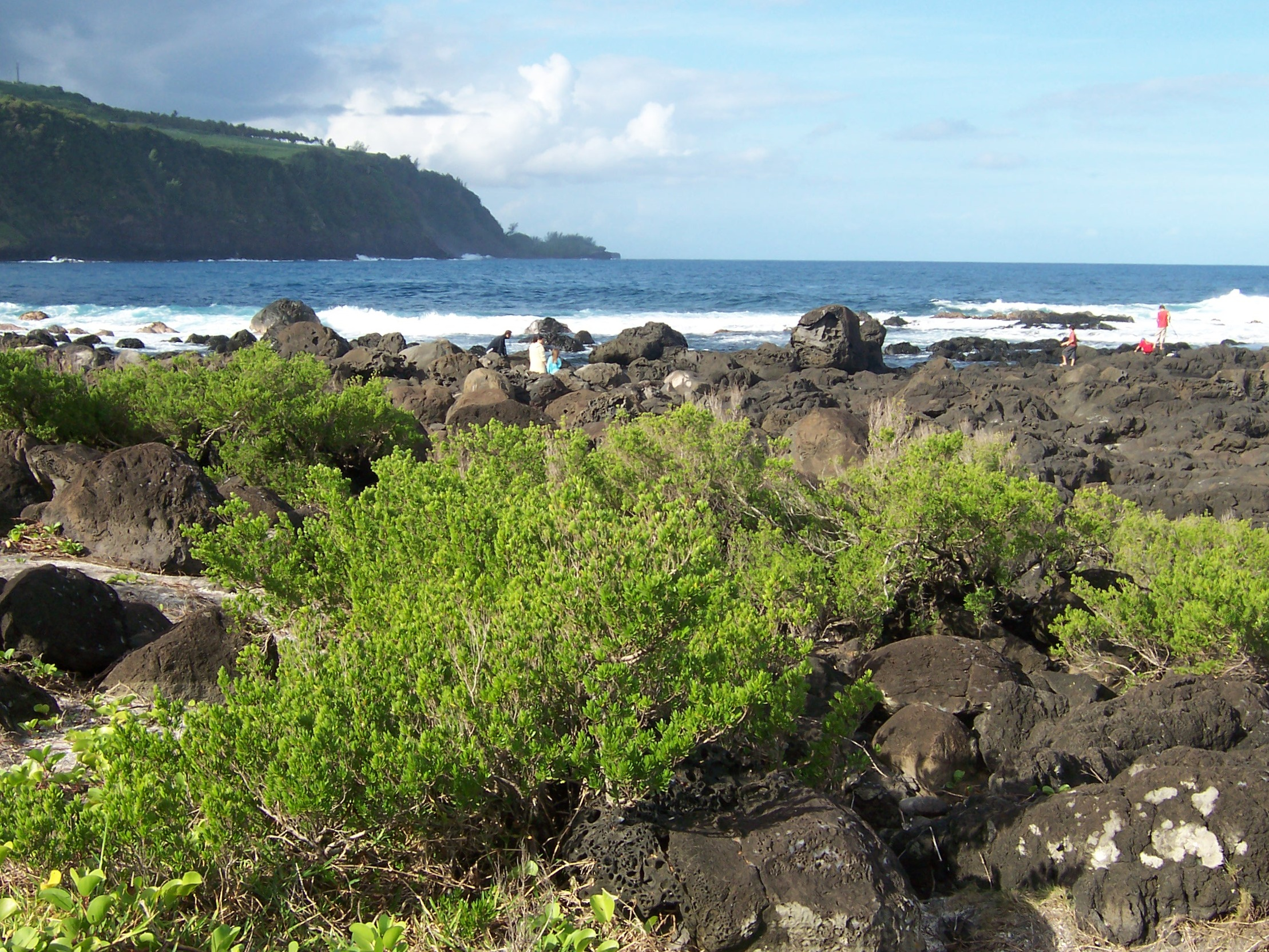
- Pemphis acidula, in its shortest form, on the coast of Réunion Island

Scientific classification
- Kingdom: Plantae
- Clade: Tracheophytes
- Clade: Angiosperms
- Clade: Eudicots
- Clade: Rosids
- Order: Myrtales
- Family: Lythraceae
- Subfamily: Lythroideae
- Genus: Pemphis; J.R.Forst & G.Forst

= Pemphis =

Genus of flowering plants

Pemphis is a genus of maritime plants in family Lythraceae. It has only one species described in 1775, Pemphis acidula.

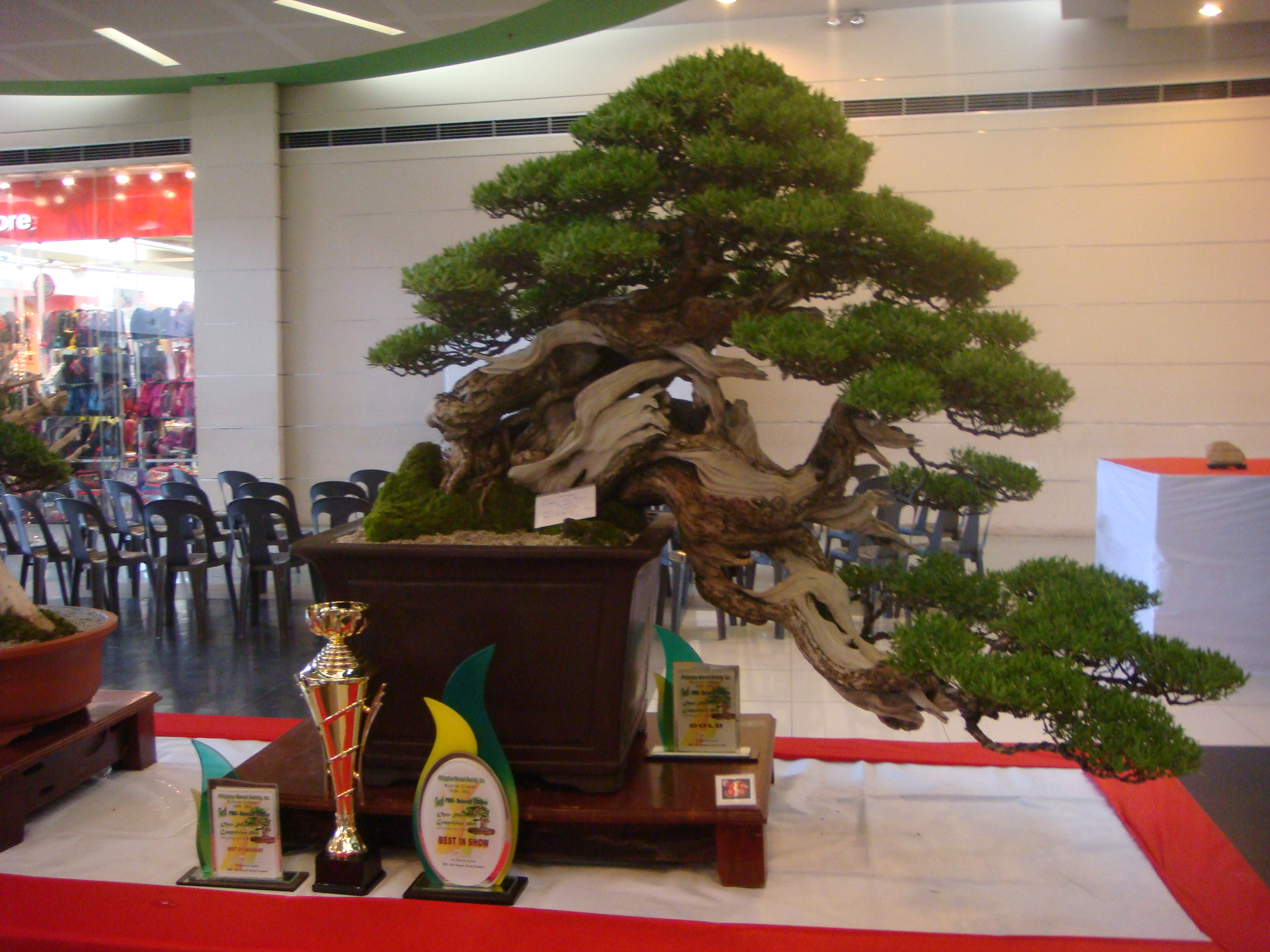
Pemphis acidula, bonsai

Pemphis are highly adaptive. Depending on environmental factors, they are densely branched, or low and spreading bushes or short trees, with main stems that can be furcated and lie nearly prone, or develop into one erect trunk. Leaves can be small, fleshy and succulent, or larger, flat and not fleshy. All surfaces are covered generally in silky, colorless trichomes. The fruits and bee-pollinated flowers are produced throughout the year. Seeds can float, and are sometimes propagated through water dispersal.

== Habitat ==
Most Pemphis live either at the verges of mangrove forests, well away from the forest-ocean interface; or they colonize beaches behind the intertidal zone, taking hold on rocks, gravel or sand, laterite or limestone, and frequently on promontories or crags.

== Range and distribution ==
They are not common, but far ranging from coastal, eastern Africa (including the Seychelles, and the Zanzibar Archipelago), states with Indian Ocean coastlines, to the Pacific (Philippines, Cook Islands), northwards up to Taiwan and the Ryukyu Islands Other places reporting Pemphis include mainland coastal Tanzania, Thailand, Malaysia (Johore), Singapore, Indonesia (Papua, Sumatra, the Moluccas, Madura and Java), Papua New Guinea, Hong Kong and throughout tropical Australia. On Java in particular (where it is known as stigi or santigi), some areas are uncharacteristically abundant.

== Uses ==
Despite the difficulty presented for the prospective carver, wood from Pemphis species is highly prized for its extreme heaviness, toughness and resistance to warping. It is usually fashioned into walking canes, fence posts, tool handles, and even anchors, exhibiting a fine finish.

Pemphis acidula is a valuable tropical species for bonsai, particularly in Asia.

== Species ==
This list is according to World Flora Online.

- Pemphis acidula J.R.Forst. & G.Forst. (type)

Former species include:

- Pemphis hexandra Mart. ex Koehne = Diplusodon hexander
- Pemphis madagascariensis (Baker) Koehne = Koehneria madagascariensis
- Pemphis stachydifolia Mart. ex Koehne = Diplusodon villosissimus

== See also ==
- Mangroves
