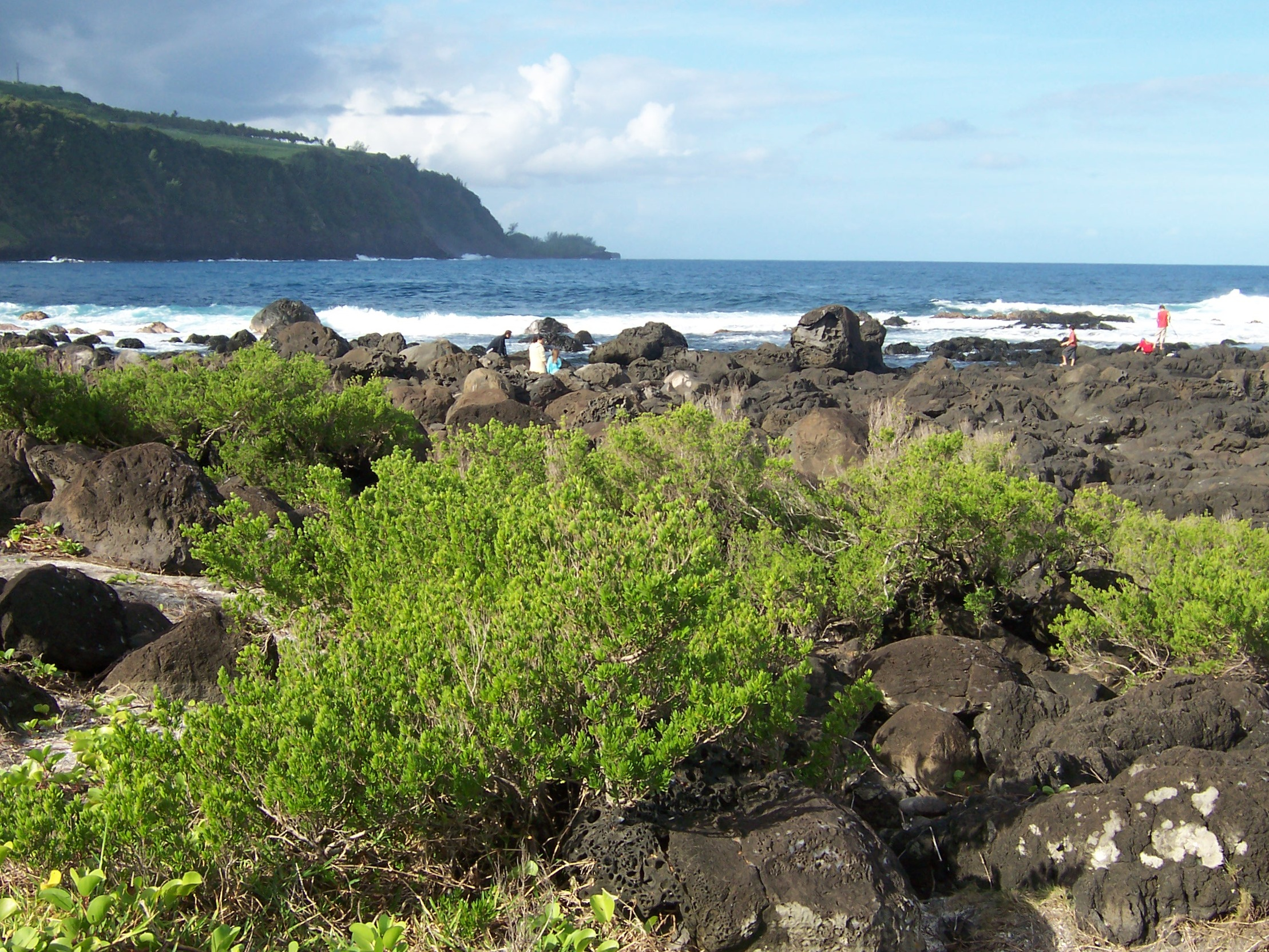
- Pemphis acidula bushes on the shore of Réunion Island

Conservation status
- Least Concern (IUCN 3.1)

Scientific classification
- Kingdom: Plantae
- Clade: Tracheophytes
- Clade: Angiosperms
- Clade: Eudicots
- Clade: Rosids
- Order: Myrtales
- Family: Lythraceae
- Genus: Pemphis
- Species: P. acidula

Binomial name
- Pemphis acidula J.R.Forst & G.Forst

Synonyms
- Macclellandia griffithiana Wight; Melanium fruticosum Spreng.; Melanium rupestre Zipp.; Millania rupestris Zipp. ex Bl.; Pemphis angustifolia Roxb.; Pemphis setosa Blanco

= Pemphis acidula =

Species of plant

Pemphis acidula, commonly known as bantigue (pron. bahn-TEE-geh) or mentigi, is a species of flowering plant in the family Lythraceae. It is the only species in the genus Pemphis.

It is found growing in sandy and calcareous soils in littoral zones, rocky shores and mangroves throughout most of the tropical Indo-Pacific.

== Botany ==
The mentigi is a stocky bush that grows up to 25 feet (760 cm) high with dense and twisted branches. Its greyish leaves are small but thick and hairy.

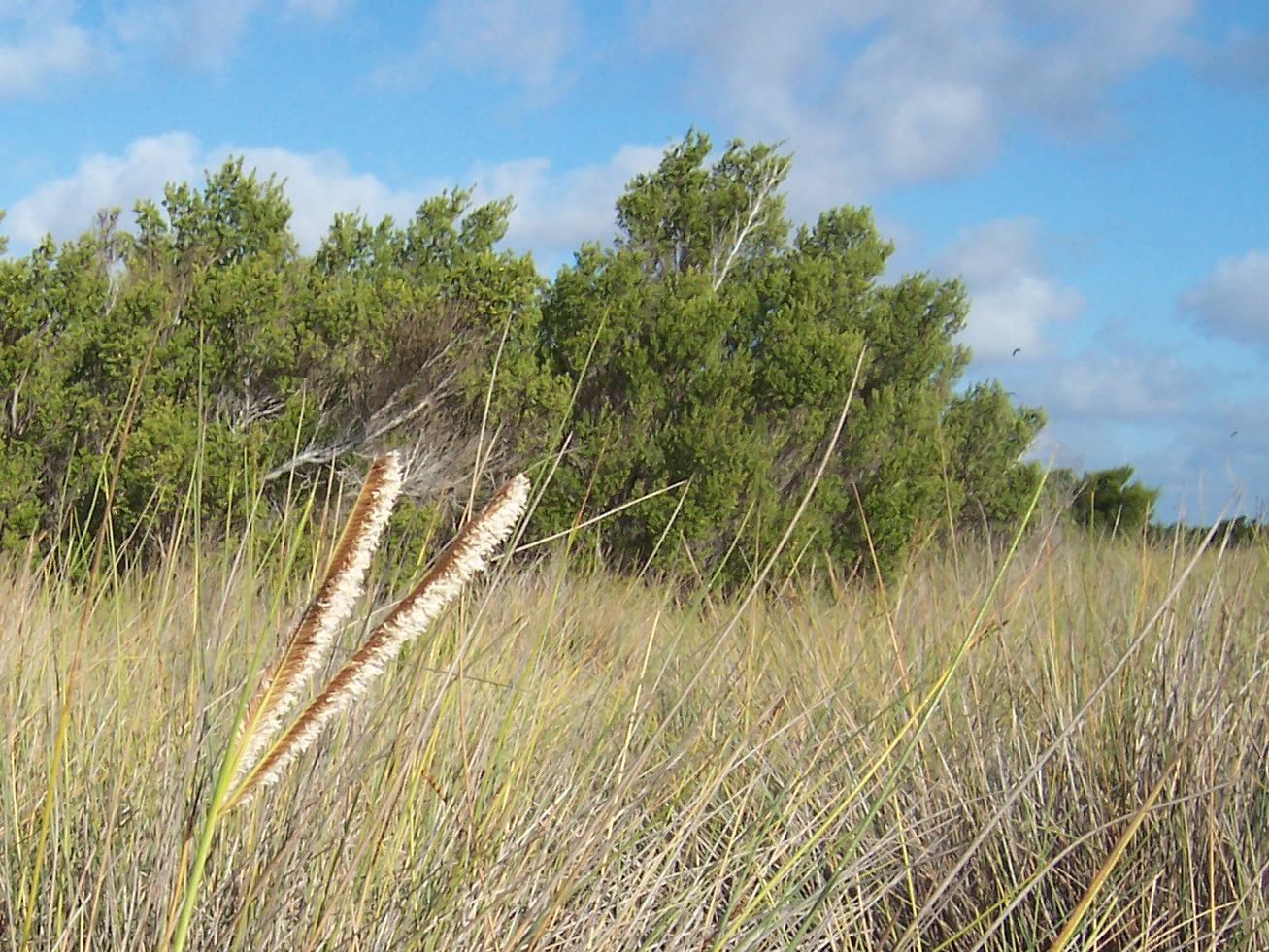
Mentigi bushes behind a dry grass field in Europa Island.

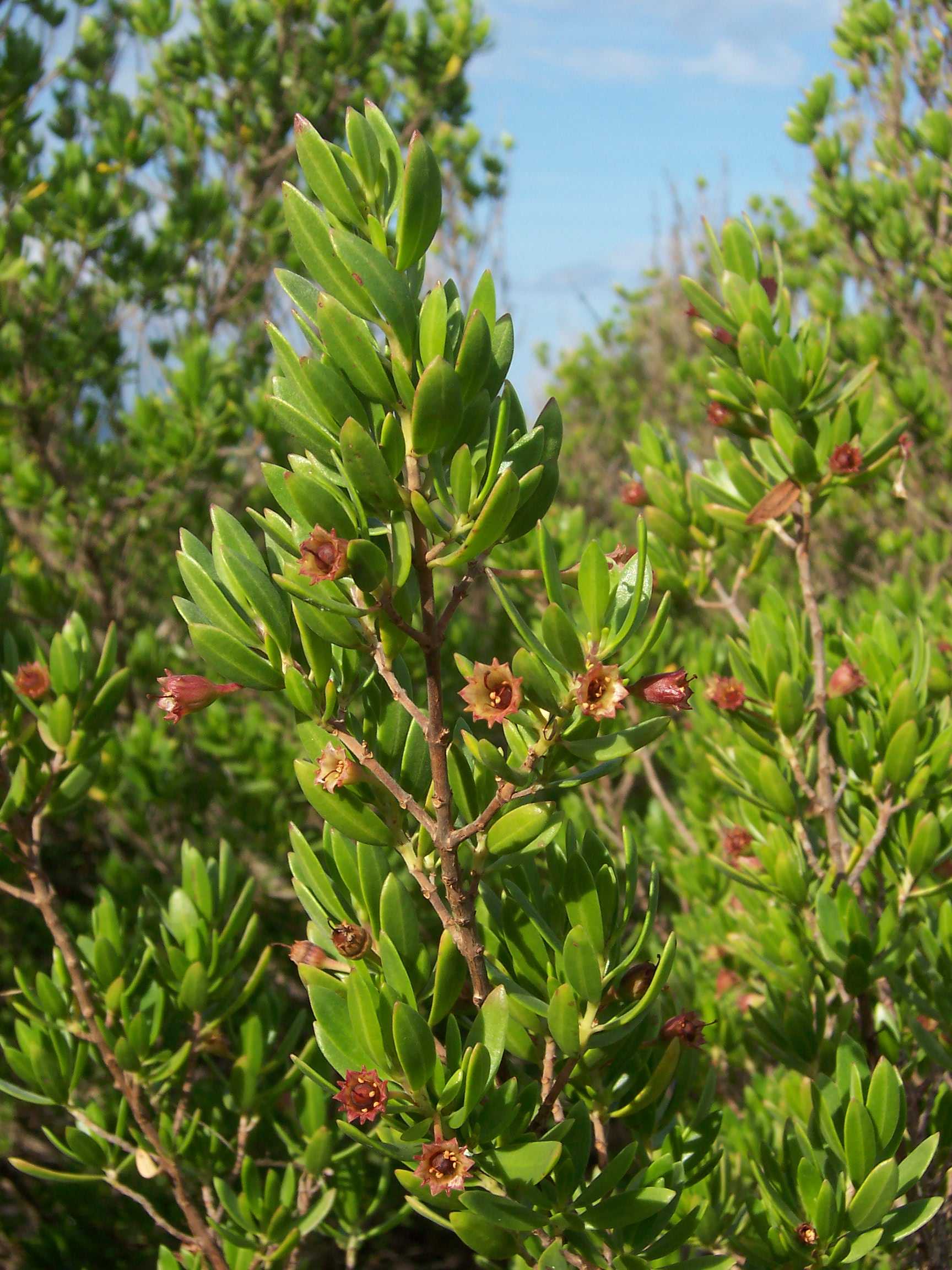
Mentigi branches

Its flowers are small and not fragrant, each has six delicate white petals and come from stalks 5–15 mm long.

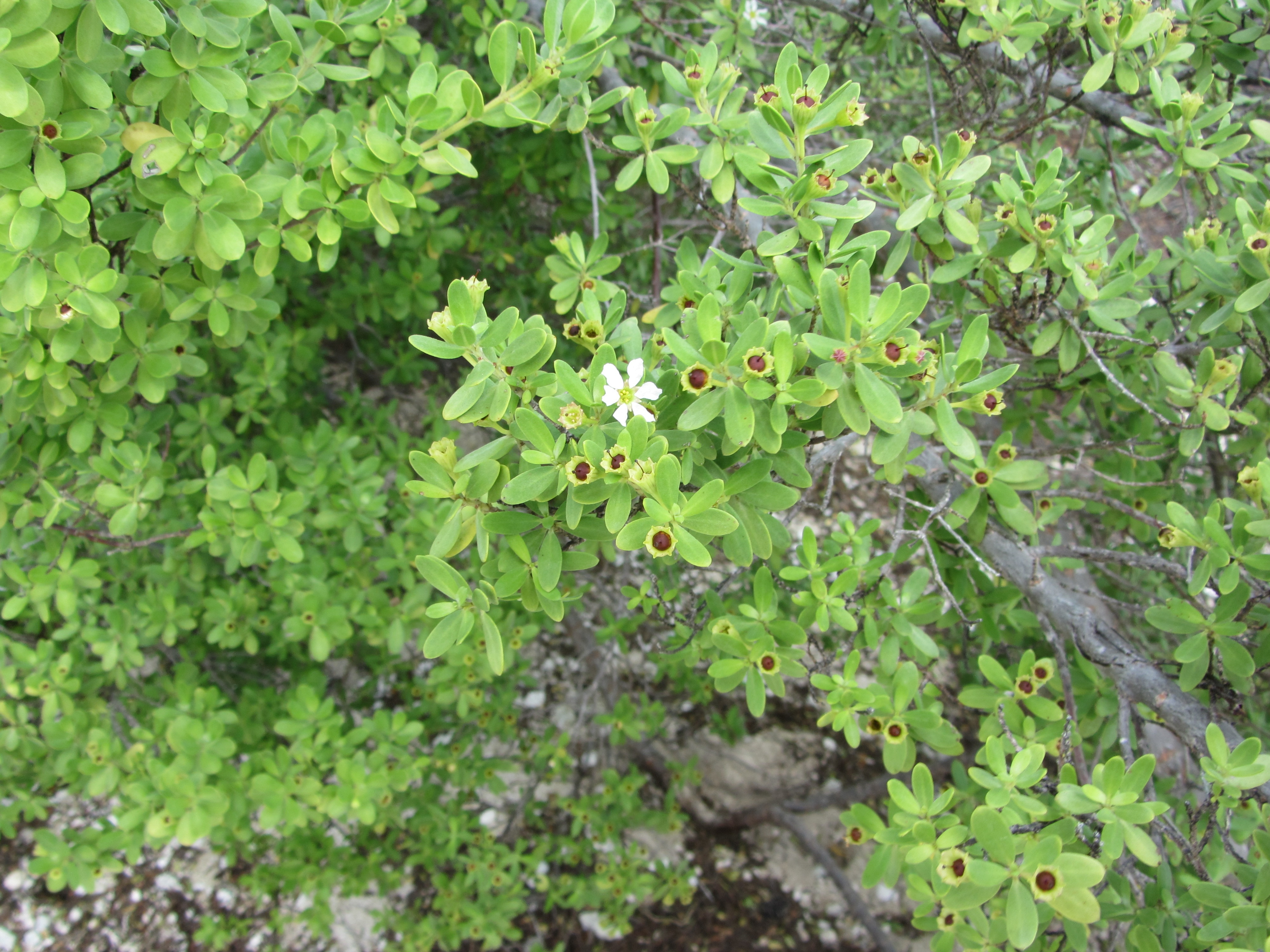
Pemphis acidula flowers and fruits in Aitutaki, Cook Islands.

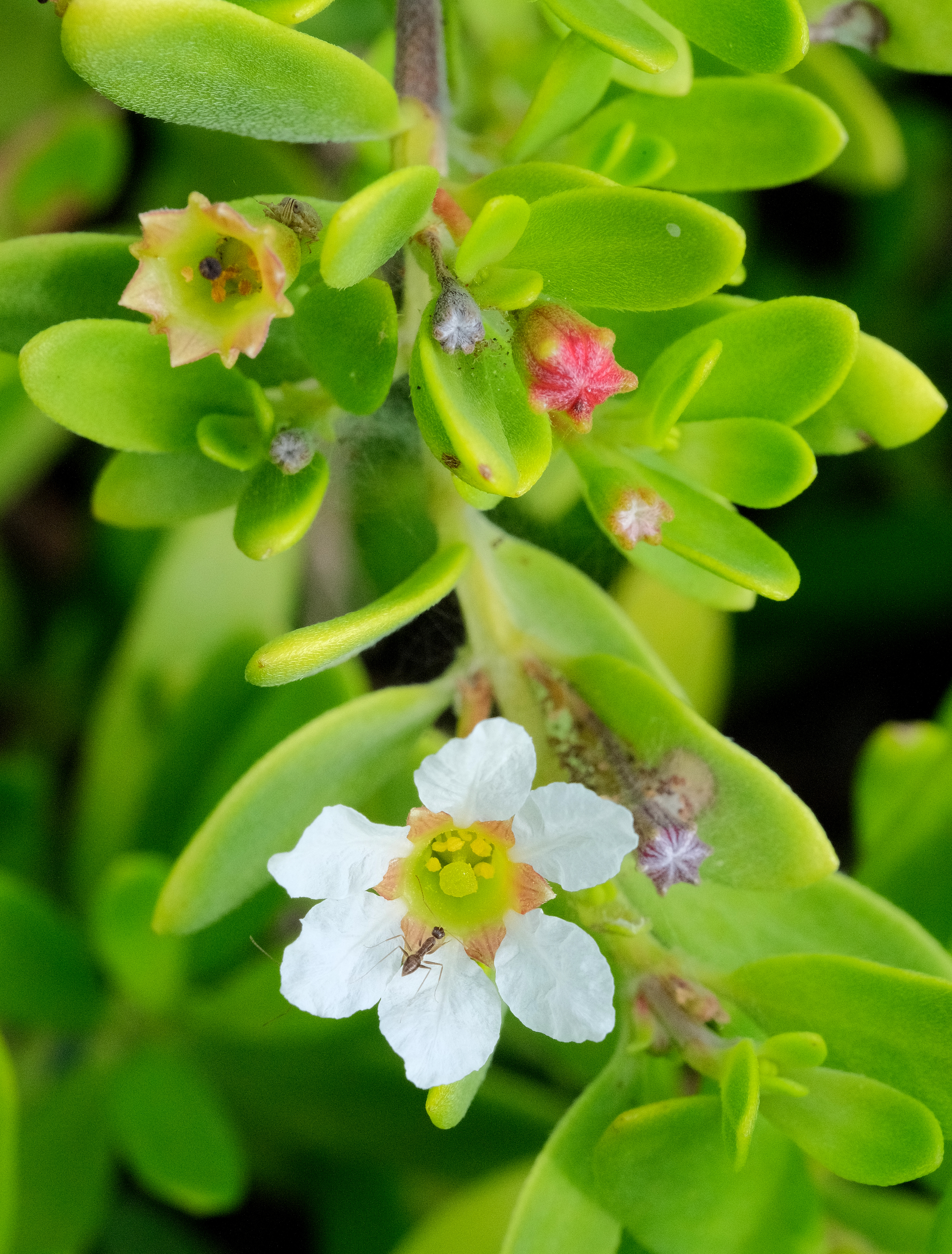
Closeup of Pemphis acidula flower blossoms with ant on Niue.

== Uses ==
The wood of this species has been traditionally valued in many cultures for it is hard and heavy, as well as resistant to rot and warping. It also has naturally a fine finish and may be fashioned into walking canes, fence posts, tool handles, and even anchors. In Réunion and Mauritius it is known as bois matelot. In the Maldives this hardy wood was used in traditional shipbuilding to hold the planks of the hull together, as well as to fashion "nails" in local sorcery.

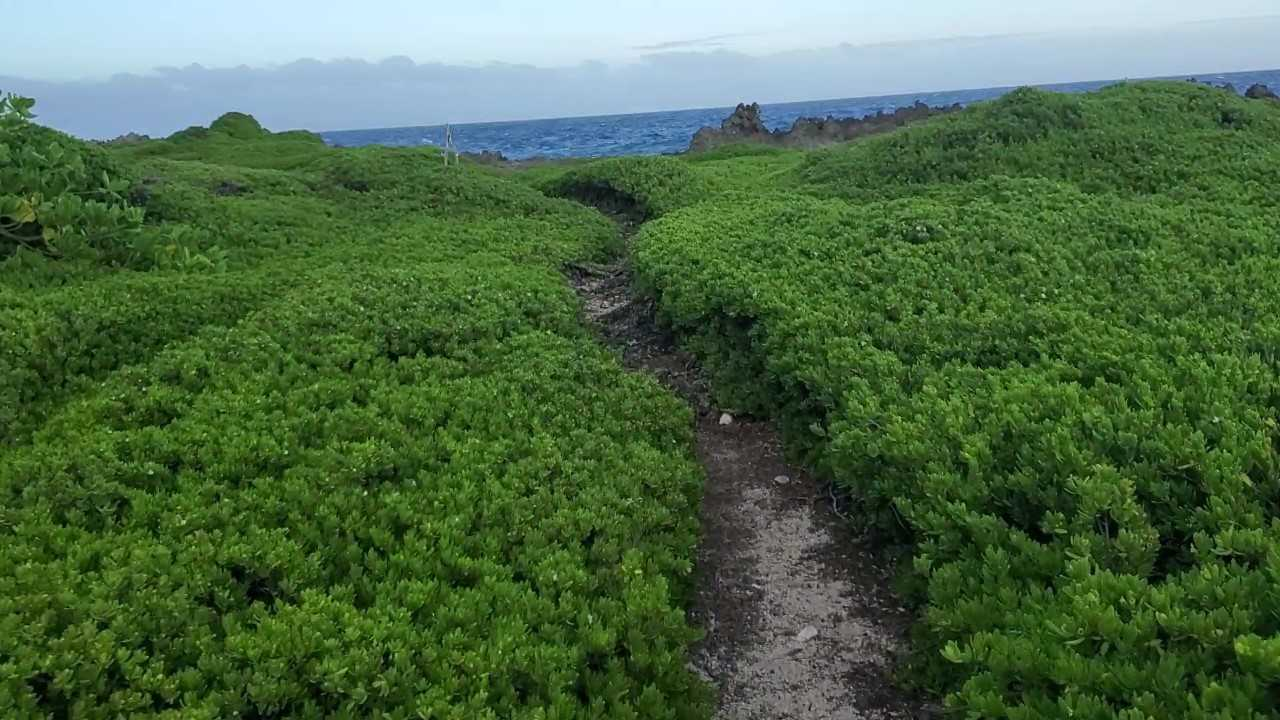
Dwarfed growth habit of Pemphis acidula covering sea-exposed coral limestone, Guam.

Pemphis acidula is also one of the plant species used in bonsai. Due to its tropical preference and typhoon-resistance, it is the most common species for bonsai in the Philippines; but it is also grown as bonsai in Taiwan and the Ryukyu Islands of Japan. Due to its popularity and high value among bonsai enthusiasts, it is among the list of species classified as 'threatened' by the Department of Environment and Natural Resources of the Philippines. The collection, selling, and transport of wild Pemphis acidula is illegal in the Philippines and punishable by fines and imprisonment of up to six years.

In Marovo Island, Tonga, Tahiti, and other South Pacific islands, it is used to make wooden tools such as pestles, tool handles, weapons, and combs.

In Taiwan's Kenting National Park illegal picking has had a negative impact on the coastal ecosystem.

== See also ==
- Mangroves
