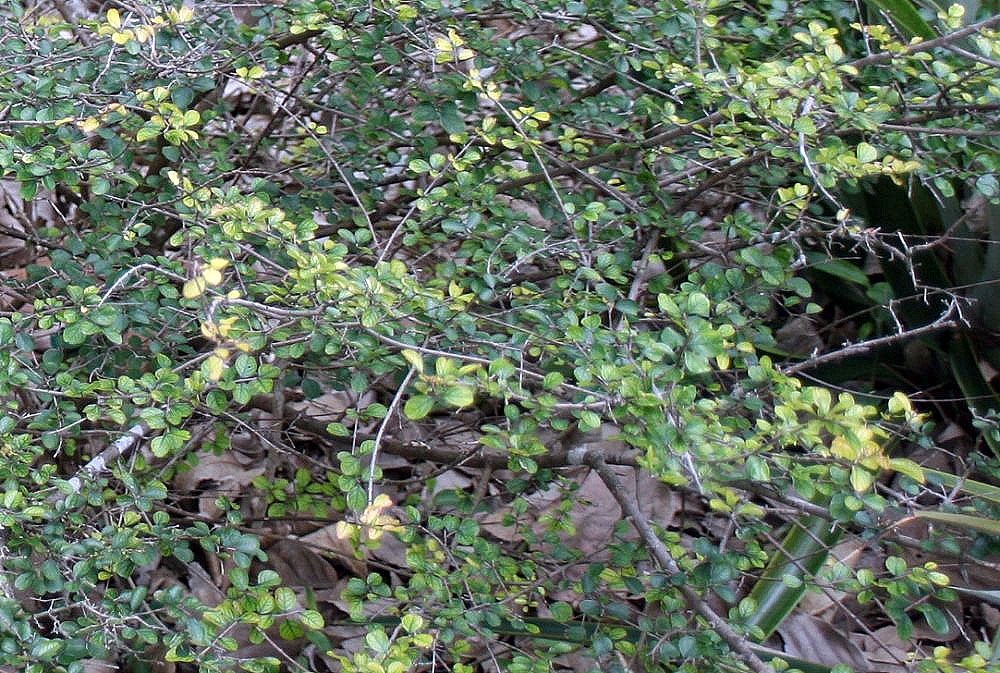
- Capuronia madagascariensis (now Capuronia benoistii) at Fairchild Tropical Botanic Garden, Florida

Conservation status
- Least Concern (IUCN 3.1)

Scientific classification
- Kingdom: Plantae
- Clade: Tracheophytes
- Clade: Angiosperms
- Clade: Eudicots
- Clade: Rosids
- Order: Myrtales
- Family: Lythraceae
- Genus: Capuronia; Lourteig
- Species: C. benoistii

Binomial name
- Capuronia benoistii (Leandri) P.E.Berry

Synonyms
- Species: Euphorbia benoistii Leandri; Capuronia madagascariensis Lourteig

= Capuronia =

Genus of flowering plants

Capuronia is a monotypic genus of flowering plants in the family Lythraceae. It contains the single species Capuronia benoistii, native to Madagascar.
