= T. salicifolia =

T. salicifolia may refer to:

- Tetrataxis salicifolia, a plant species endemic to Mauritius
- Tournefortia salicifolia DC., a plant species in the genus Tournefortia

== See also ==
- Salicifolia (disambiguation)
