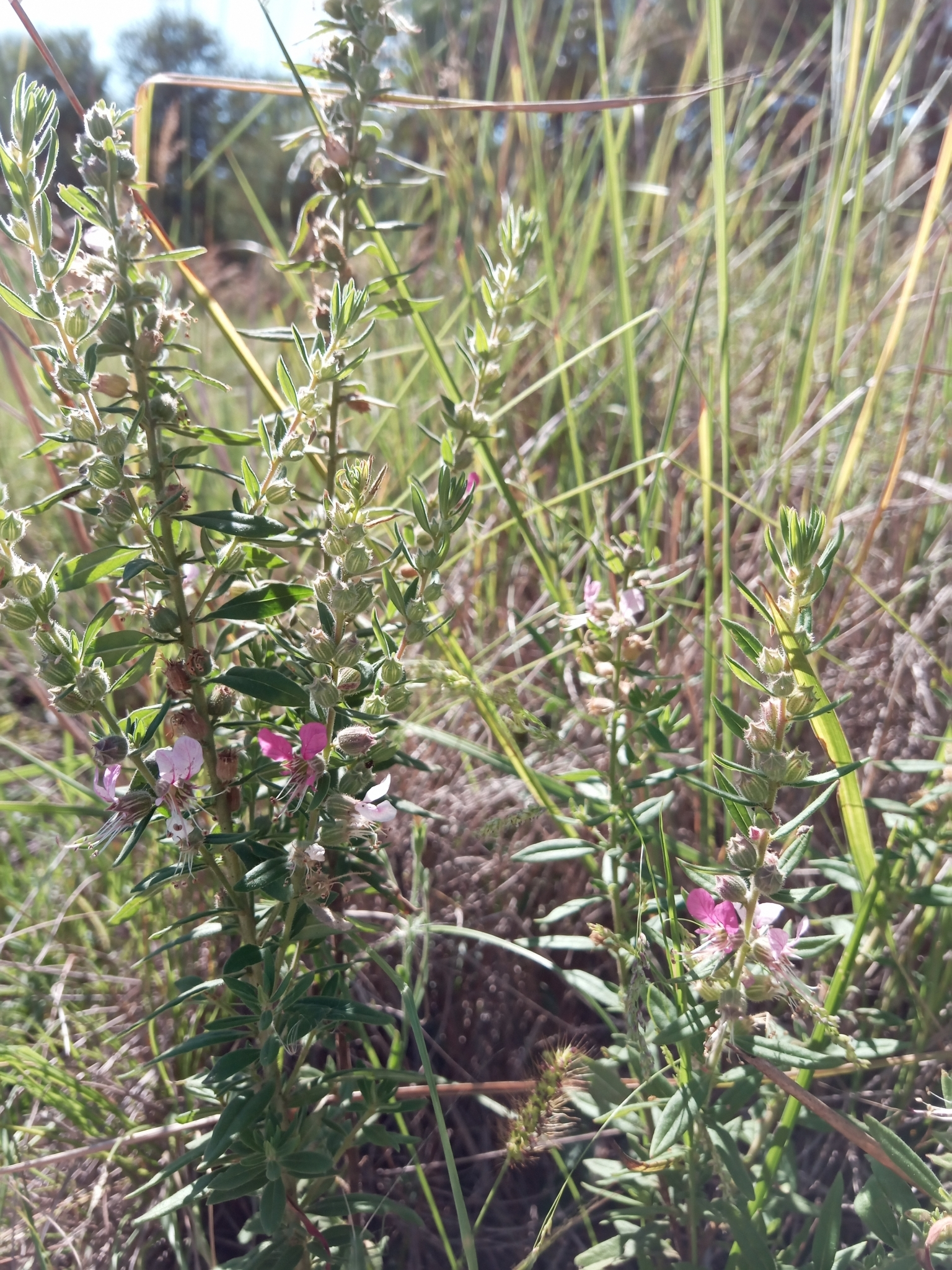
- Pleurophora saccocarpa

Scientific classification
- Kingdom: Plantae
- Clade: Tracheophytes
- Clade: Angiosperms
- Clade: Eudicots
- Clade: Rosids
- Order: Myrtales
- Family: Lythraceae
- Genus: Pleurophora; D.Don

= Pleurophora =

Genus of plants

Pleurophora is a genus of flowering plants belonging to the family Lythraceae.

The native range of its species spans from Venezuela to southern South America.

== Species ==
The following species are recognised in the genus Pleurophora:

- Pleurophora annulosa Koehne
- Pleurophora anomala (A.St.-Hil.) Koehne
- Pleurophora patagonica Speg.
- Pleurophora polyandra Hook. & Arn.
- Pleurophora pulchra J.A.Siqueira, Cotarelli, J.F.B.Pastore & T.B.Cavalc.
- Pleurophora pungens D.Don
- Pleurophora pusilla Hook. & Arn.
- Pleurophora saccocarpa Koehne
