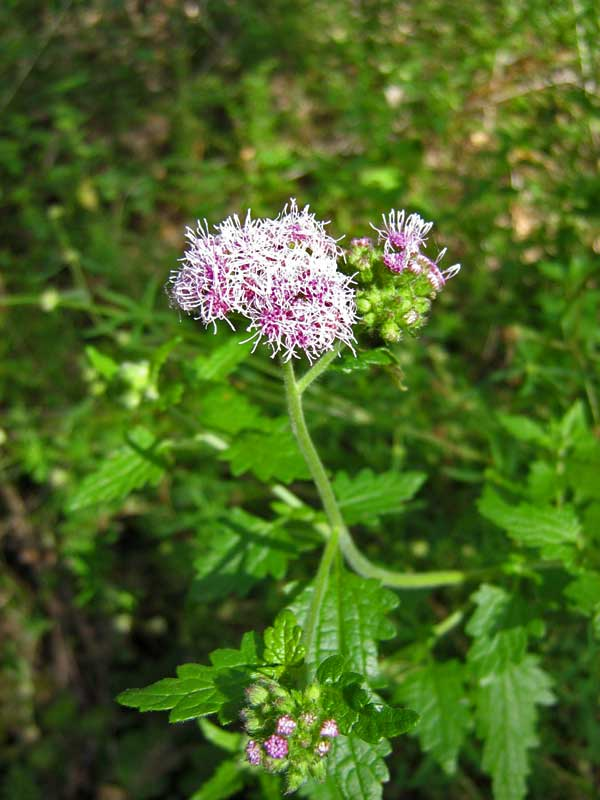
- Lourteigia ballotaefolia

Scientific classification
- Kingdom: Plantae
- Clade: Embryophytes
- Clade: Tracheophytes
- Clade: Spermatophytes
- Clade: Angiosperms
- Clade: Eudicots
- Clade: Asterids
- Order: Asterales
- Family: Asteraceae
- Subfamily: Asteroideae
- Tribe: Eupatorieae
- Genus: Lourteigia; R.M.King & H.Rob.

Type species
- Eupatorium stoechadifolium L.f.

= Lourteigia =

Genus of flowering plants

Lourteigia is a genus of South American flowering plants in the tribe Eupatorieae within the family Asteraceae.

The genus name of Lourteigia is in honour of Alicia Lourteig (1913–2003), an Argentine and French botanist, who was a world specialist in Oxalidaceae plants. It was first described and published in Phytologia Vol.21 on page 28 in 1971.

Species

- Lourteigia aroensis V.M.Badillo
- Lourteigia ballotaefolia (Kunth) R.M.King & H.Rob.
- Lourteigia dichroa (B.L.Rob.) R.M.King & H.Rob.
- Lourteigia fimbriata V.M.Badillo
- Lourteigia humilis (Benth.) R.M.King & H.Rob.
- Lourteigia lanulata (B.L.Rob.) R.M.King & H.Rob.
- Lourteigia microphylla (L.f.) R.M.King & H.Rob.
- Lourteigia morenoi V.M.Badillo
- Lourteigia ornatiloba (B.L.Rob.) R.M.King & H.Rob.
- Lourteigia scandens V.M.Badillo
- Lourteigia stoechadifolia (L.f.) R.M.King & H.Rob.
