= Diplusodon =

Scientific classification
- Kingdom: Plantae
- Clade: Tracheophytes
- Clade: Angiosperms
- Clade: Eudicots
- Clade: Rosids
- Order: Myrtales
- Family: Lythraceae
- Genus: Diplusodon; Pohl

Genus of plants

Diplusodon is a genus of flowering plants belonging to the family Lythraceae.

Its native range is Brazil to Bolivia.

Species:

- Diplusodon adpressipilus Lourteig
- Diplusodon aggregatifolius T.B.Cavalc.
- Diplusodon alatus T.B.Cavalc.
- Diplusodon appendiculosus Lourteig
- Diplusodon argenteus Lourteig
- Diplusodon argyrophyllus T.B.Cavalc.
- Diplusodon astictus Lourteig
- Diplusodon bahiensis T.B.Cavalc.
- Diplusodon bolivianus T.B.Cavalc. & S.A.Graham
- Diplusodon bradei Pilg.
- Diplusodon burchellii Koehne
- Diplusodon buxifolius (Cham. & Schltdl.) DC.
- Diplusodon caesariatus Lourteig
- Diplusodon canastrensis T.B.Cavalc.
- Diplusodon candollei Pohl ex DC.
- Diplusodon capitalensis T.B.Cavalc.
- Diplusodon capitatus (A.St.-Hil.) Koehne
- Diplusodon chapadensis T.B.Cavalc.
- Diplusodon ciliatiflorus T.B.Cavalc.
- Diplusodon ciliiflorus Koehne
- Diplusodon cordifolius Lourteig
- Diplusodon cryptanthus T.B.Cavalc.
- Diplusodon decussatus Gardner & Fielding
- Diplusodon divaricatus Pohl
- Diplusodon epilobioides DC.
- Diplusodon ericoides Lourteig
- Diplusodon fastigiatus Lourteig
- Diplusodon floribundus Pohl
- Diplusodon foliosus (Koehne) T.B.Cavalc.
- Diplusodon glaucescens DC.
- Diplusodon glaziovii Koehne
- Diplusodon glocimarii T.B.Cavalc.
- Diplusodon gracilis Koehne
- Diplusodon grahamiae T.B.Cavalc.
- Diplusodon hatschbachii Lourteig
- Diplusodon helianthemifolius DC.
- Diplusodon heringeri Lourteig
- Diplusodon hexander DC.
- Diplusodon hirsutus (Cham. & Schltdl.) DC.
- Diplusodon imbricatus Pohl
- Diplusodon incanus Gardner & Fielding
- Diplusodon irwinii Lourteig
- Diplusodon kielmeyeroides A.St.-Hil.
- Diplusodon lanceolatus Pohl
- Diplusodon leucocalycinus Lourteig
- Diplusodon longipes Koehne
- Diplusodon lythroides DC.
- Diplusodon macrodon Koehne
- Diplusodon marginatus Pohl
- Diplusodon mattogrossensis T.B.Cavalc.
- Diplusodon micromerus T.B.Cavalc.
- Diplusodon microphyllus Pohl
- Diplusodon minasensis Lourteig
- Diplusodon mononeuros Pilg.
- Diplusodon myrsinites DC.
- Diplusodon nigricans Koehne
- Diplusodon nitidus DC.
- Diplusodon oblongus Pohl
- Diplusodon orbicularis Koehne
- Diplusodon ovatus Pohl
- Diplusodon panniculatus Koehne
- Diplusodon paraisoensis Lourteig
- Diplusodon parvifolius Mart. ex DC.
- Diplusodon petiolatus (Koehne) T.B.Cavalc.
- Diplusodon plumbeus T.B.Cavalc.
- Diplusodon psammophilus Lourteig
- Diplusodon puberulus Koehne
- Diplusodon punctatus Pohl
- Diplusodon pygmaeus T.B.Cavalc.
- Diplusodon quintuplinervius (Nees) Koehne
- Diplusodon ramosissimus Pohl
- Diplusodon retroimbricatus Koehne
- Diplusodon rosmarinifolius A.St.-Hil.
- Diplusodon rotatus T.B.Cavalc.
- Diplusodon rotundifolius DC.
- Diplusodon rupestris T.B.Cavalc.
- Diplusodon saxatilis Lourteig
- Diplusodon sessiliflorus Koehne
- Diplusodon sigillatus Lourteig
- Diplusodon smithii Lourteig
- Diplusodon sordidus Koehne
- Diplusodon speciosus (Kunth) DC.
- Diplusodon stellatus T.B.Cavalc.
- Diplusodon strigosus Pohl
- Diplusodon subsericeus Casar. ex Koehne
- Diplusodon thymifolius DC.
- Diplusodon thysanosepalus Lourteig & Sandwith
- Diplusodon trigintus T.B.Cavalc.
- Diplusodon ulei Koehne
- Diplusodon uninervius Koehne
- Diplusodon urceolatus Lourteig
- Diplusodon venosus T.B.Cavalc.
- Diplusodon verruculosus T.B.Cavalc.
- Diplusodon vidalii Lourteig
- Diplusodon villosissimus Pohl
- Diplusodon villosus Pohl
- Diplusodon virgatus Pohl
- Diplusodon vittatus T.B.Cavalc.
- Diplusodon xerampelinus Lourteig
- Diplusodon xiphodon T.B.Cavalc.
