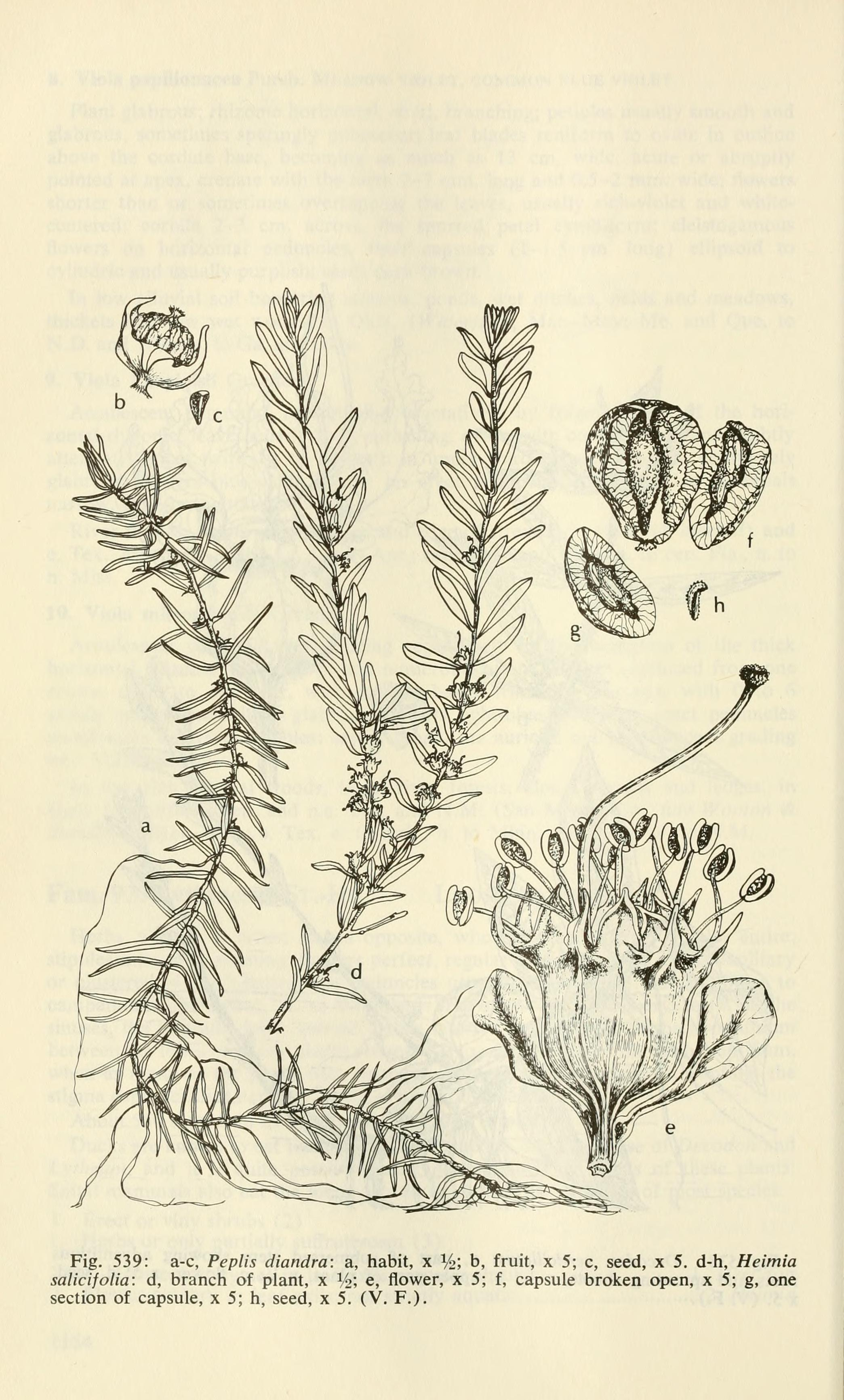

Scientific classification
- Kingdom: Plantae
- Clade: Tracheophytes
- Clade: Angiosperms
- Clade: Eudicots
- Clade: Rosids
- Order: Myrtales
- Family: Lythraceae
- Genus: Didiplis; Raf.
- Species: D. diandra

Binomial name
- Didiplis diandra (Nutt. ex DC.) Alph.Wood

= Didiplis =

Genus of plants

Didiplis is a monotypic genus of flowering plants belonging to the family Lythraceae. The only species is Didiplis diandra.

Its native range is Southeastern USA to Northeastern Mexico.
