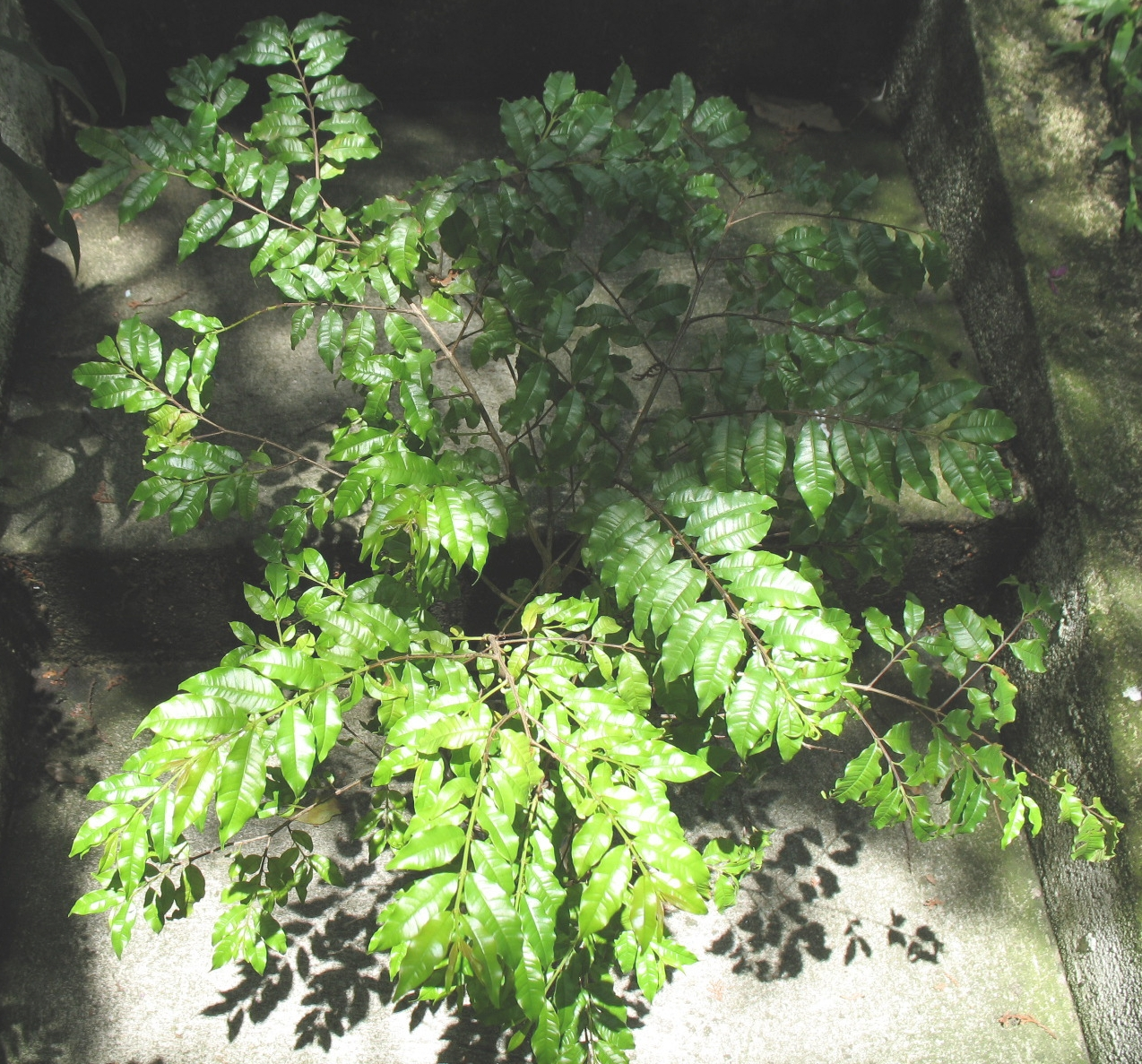
- Lafoensia glyptocarpa

Scientific classification
- Kingdom: Plantae
- Clade: Tracheophytes
- Clade: Angiosperms
- Clade: Eudicots
- Clade: Rosids
- Order: Myrtales
- Family: Lythraceae
- Subfamily: Lythroideae
- Genus: Lafoensia; Vand.

= Lafoensia =

Genus of flowering plants

Lafoensia is a genus of plant in family Lythraceae. It contains the following species (but this list may be incomplete):
Lafoensia glyptocarpa
Lafoensia pacari St.-Hil.
Lafoensia punicifolia DC.
Lafoensia replicata Pohl Lafoensia speciosa DC.
