= Alicia Lourteig =

Argentine botanist (1913-2003)

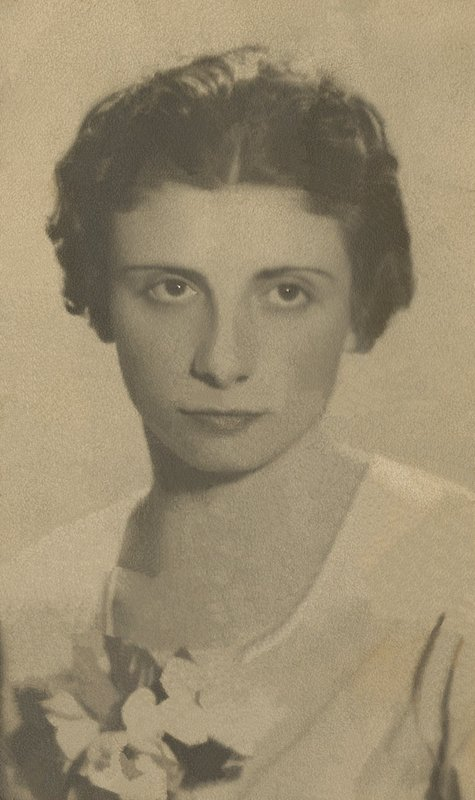
- Born: 17 December 1913; Buenos Aires
- Died: 30 July 2003 (aged 89); Buenos Aires
- Education: University of Buenos Aires
- Awards: Guggenheim Fellowship
- Scientific career
- Fields: Botany, Taxonomy
- Author abbrev. (botany): Lourteig

Alicia Lourteig (1913–2003) was an Argentine and French botanist, world specialist in Oxalidaceae.

== Personal life and education ==
Alicia Lourteig was born in Buenos Aires, Argentina. Her parents originated from France and Argentina. She studied pharmacy and biochemistry at university in Buenos Aires, and her doctorate was awarded in 1946.

== Career ==
Despite the subjects she studied at university, Lourteig's career was as a botanist, particularly as a taxonomist of the Lythraceae, Ranunculaceae, Mayacaceae and Oxalidaceae. Her interests extended to the history of botany in South America and the Antilles.

She was employed as a botanist from 1938 until 1947 at the Miguel Lillo Institute within the University of Tucuman. She then moved to the Darwinion Botanic Institute in San Isidro. She was able to visit other herbaria in America and Europe. These included the Royal Botanical Gardens, Kew, UK (1948 to 1950) and herbaria in Stockholm (1950-1951), Copenhagen (1951), Boston (1952-1953) and Washington (1953).

In 1955 she was recruited by the French National Centre for Scientific Research so moved to join the National Museum of Natural History, France as curator of the New World botanic collection. She contributed to the supplement of the Flore de France by Hippolyte Coste and revisions of the International Code of Botanical Nomenclature. She organised collections made by Aimé Bonpland (1773-1858), José Celestino Mutis (1732-1808), Surian and Charles Plumier (1646-1704) that were in the Paris museum. She became a research associate at the museum in 1979.

Lourteig collected plant materials in South America and also collected in the French Antarctic in 1963-1964 and 1969.

She was editor of the journal Lilloa.

== Publications ==
Lourteig was the author or co-author of over 200 publications. Some of her most significant publications are:

- Piedrahita, SD; A Lourteig. (1991) Genesis De Una Flora. Ed. Academia Colombiana de Ciências Exactas, Fisicas y Naturales. 334 pp. ISBN 9589205011
- Lourteig, A. (1963) Flora del Uruguay, Mayacaceae, Zygophyllaceae, Celastraceae, Lythraceae, Primulaceae. Mus. Nac de Hist. Nat., Montevideo. 38 pp. 14 planchas
- Lourteig, A. (1956) Ranunculaceas de Sudamérica tropical pp. 19–88. Memoria, Soc. Ciências Naturales La Salle. 16: 43. Caracas
- Lourteig, A; CA O'Donell. (1955) Las celastráceas de Argentina y Chile. BA : Ministério de Agricultura y Ganadería, Serie: Publicación técnica, 15, pp 52
- Lourteig, A; CA O'Donell. (1943) Euphoriaceae of Argentina. Phyllantheae, Dalechampieae, Cluytiae, Manihoteae. Lilloa IX
- Lourteig, A; CA O'Donell. (1942) Acalypheae of Argentina (Euphorbiaceae) Lilloa VIII.

== Awards ==
- In 1999, the Millennium Award for lifetime achievement was presented to her at the XVI International Botanical Congress
- Lac Alicia in Australia Island, one of the Kerguelen Islands in French Antarctica is named after her
- a footpath in one of the Serro de Mar bio reserves in Brazil is named after her
- about 20 plant genera and species are named after her, including Alicia W.R.Anderson from the Malpighiaceae family, Lourteigia R.M. King & H. Rob. (from the Asteraceae family), and also Lourtella S.A.Graham, Baas & Tobe from the family Lythraceae.
