= Gyrosphragma =

Scientific classification
- Kingdom: Plantae
- Clade: Tracheophytes
- Clade: Angiosperms
- Clade: Eudicots
- Clade: Rosids
- Order: Myrtales
- Family: Lythraceae
- Subfamily: Lythroideae
- Genus: Gyrosphragma

Species
- Gyrosphragma latipetala T.B.Cavalc. & Facco; Gyrosphragma santos-limae (G.M.Barroso) T.B.Cavalc. & Facco

Genus of flowering plants

Gyrosphragma is a genus of flowering plants in the family Lythraceae. It includes two species native to southeastern Brazil.

- Gyrosphragma latipetala T.B.Cavalc. & Facco – Minas Gerais
- Gyrosphragma santos-limae (G.M.Barroso) T.B.Cavalc. & Facco – Espírito Santo and Rio de Janeiro

The genus was described in 2022 by Taciana Barbosa Cavalcanti and Marlon Garlet Facco.
