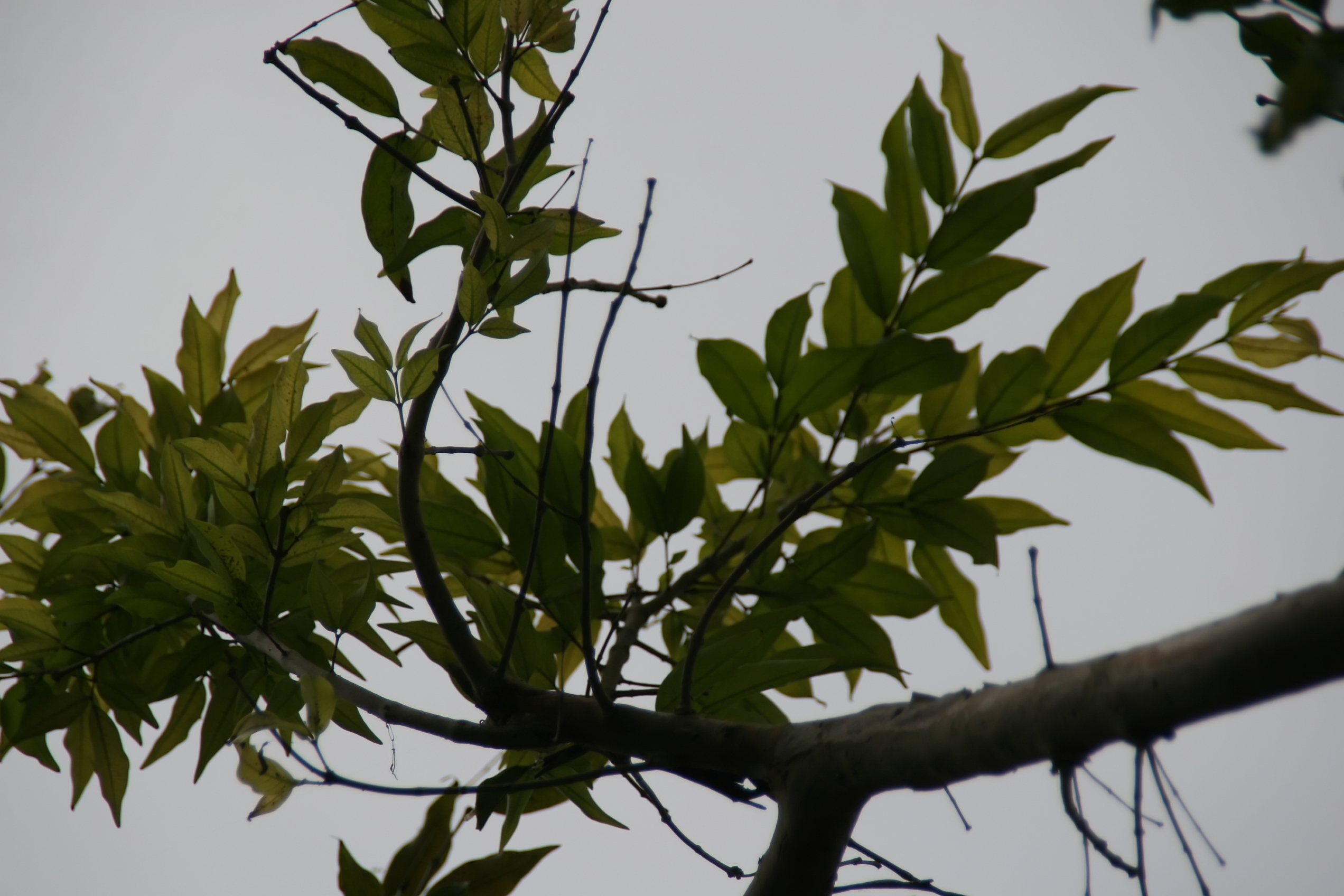
- Ginoria nudiflora

Scientific classification
- Kingdom: Plantae
- Clade: Tracheophytes
- Clade: Angiosperms
- Clade: Eudicots
- Clade: Rosids
- Order: Myrtales
- Family: Lythraceae
- Subfamily: Lythroideae
- Genus: Ginoria; Jacq. (1760)

Synonyms
- Antherylium Rohr & Vahl (1792); Ginora L. (1762), orth. var.; Haitia Urb. (1919)

= Ginoria =

Genus of flowering plants

Ginoria is a genus of plants in the family Lythraceae. It contains 13 species which are native to southern Mexico and the Caribbean.

== Species ==
13 species are currently accepted:

- Ginoria americana Jacq. – Cuba
- Ginoria arborea Britton – southeastern Cuba
- Ginoria buchii (Urb.) S.A.Graham – western and central Hispaniola
- Ginoria callosa O.C.Schmidt – northern Haiti (Haut-Pichon)
- Ginoria curvispina Koehne – Cuba
- Ginoria ginorioides (Griseb.) Britton – Cuba
- Ginoria glabra Griseb. – southeastern Cuba
- Ginoria jimenezii Alain – Dominican Republic
- Ginoria koehneana Urb. – western and eastern Cuba
- Ginoria lanceolata O.C.Schmidt – northwestern Haiti
- Ginoria nudiflora (Hemsl.) Koehne – southern Mexico
- Ginoria pulchra (Ekman & O.C.Schmidt) S.A.Graham – northwestern Haiti
- Ginoria rohrii (Vahl) Koehne – Puerto Rico and Leeward Islands
