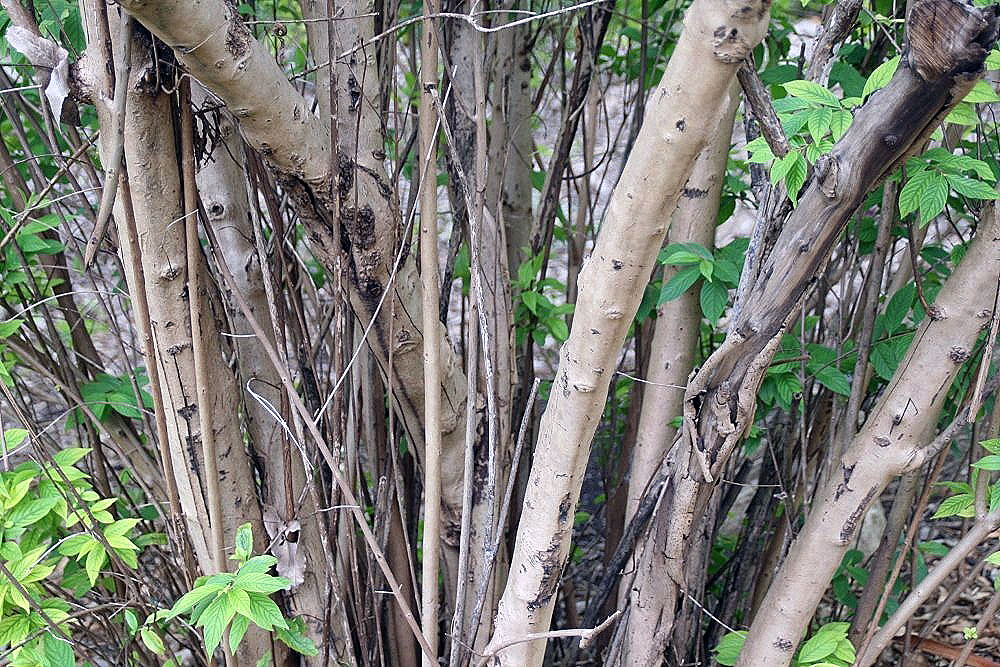
- Adenaria floribunda at Fairchild Tropical Botanic Garden, Miami

Scientific classification
- Kingdom: Plantae
- Clade: Tracheophytes
- Clade: Angiosperms
- Clade: Eudicots
- Clade: Rosids
- Order: Myrtales
- Family: Lythraceae
- Subfamily: Lythroideae
- Genus: Adenaria; Kunth
- Species: A. floribunda

Binomial name
- Adenaria floribunda Kunth

Synonyms
- Adenaria griseleoides Adenaria lanceolata Adenaria parviflora Adenaria parvifolia Adenaria purpurata

= Adenaria =

Genus of flowering plants

Adenaria is a monotypic genus of plants in the family Lythraceae containing the single species Adenaria floribunda. Its common names include fruta de pavo. It is native to Mexico, the Dominican Republic, Haiti, and parts of Central and South America.
