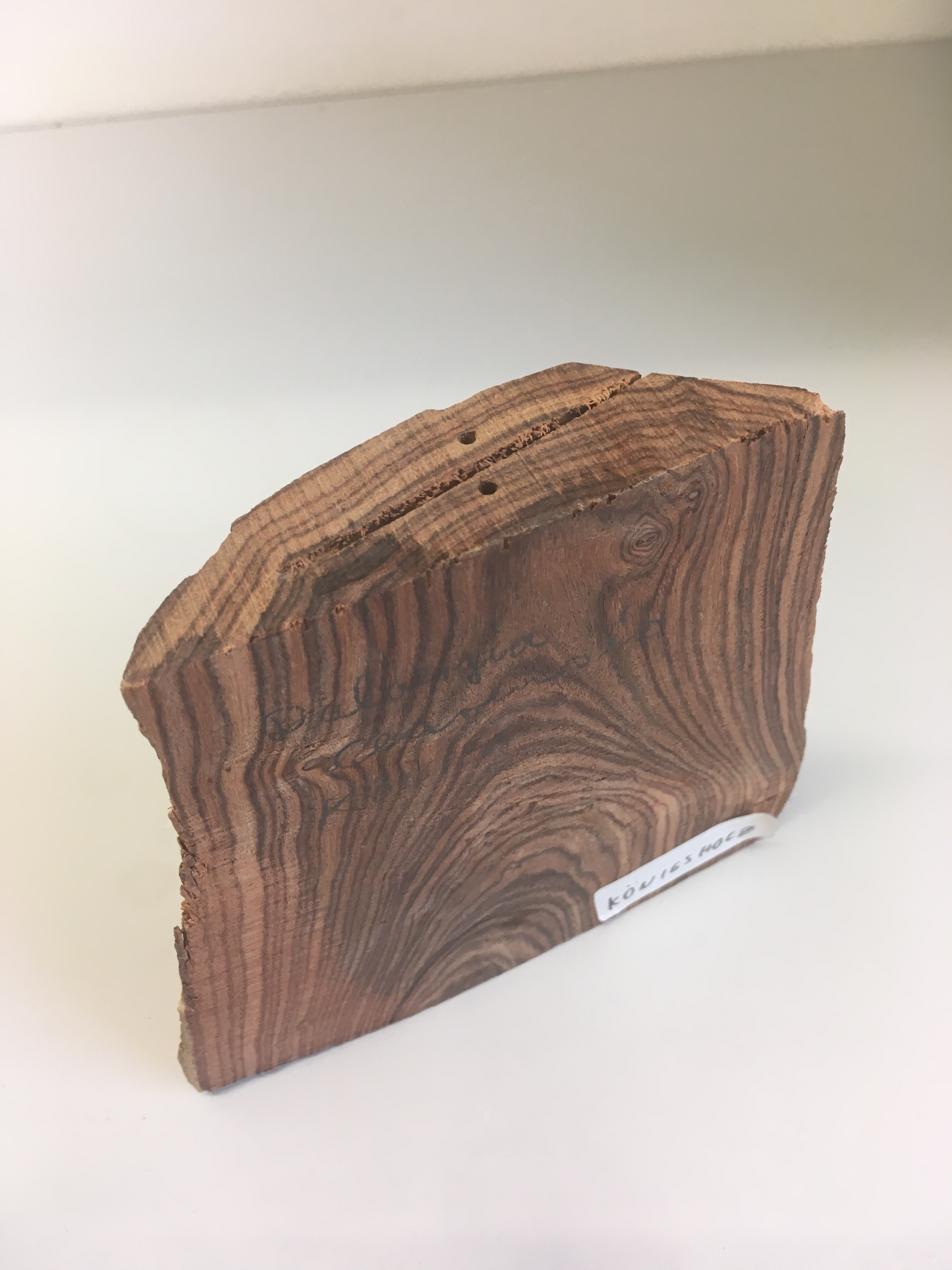
- Wood sample, radial and cross section

Conservation status
- Near Threatened (IUCN 3.1)

Scientific classification
- Kingdom: Plantae
- Clade: Tracheophytes
- Clade: Angiosperms
- Clade: Eudicots
- Clade: Rosids
- Order: Fabales
- Family: Fabaceae
- Subfamily: Faboideae
- Genus: Dalbergia
- Species: D. cearensis

Binomial name
- Dalbergia cearensis Ducke

Synonyms
- Dalbergia variabilis var. bahiensis Hoehne

= Dalbergia cearensis =

Species of flowering plant

Dalbergia cearensis, with common names Brazilian kingwood, kingwood, Bois de Violette, and violetwood, is a small tree endemic to Brazil.

It is native to the states of Bahia, Ceará, Paraíba, Pernambuco, and Piauí,

It is the source of kingwood, a classic furniture wood.

== Vernacular names ==
Brazilian common names include Jacaranda-cega-macho, Jacaranda-violeta, Miolo-de-negro, and Pau-violeta.
