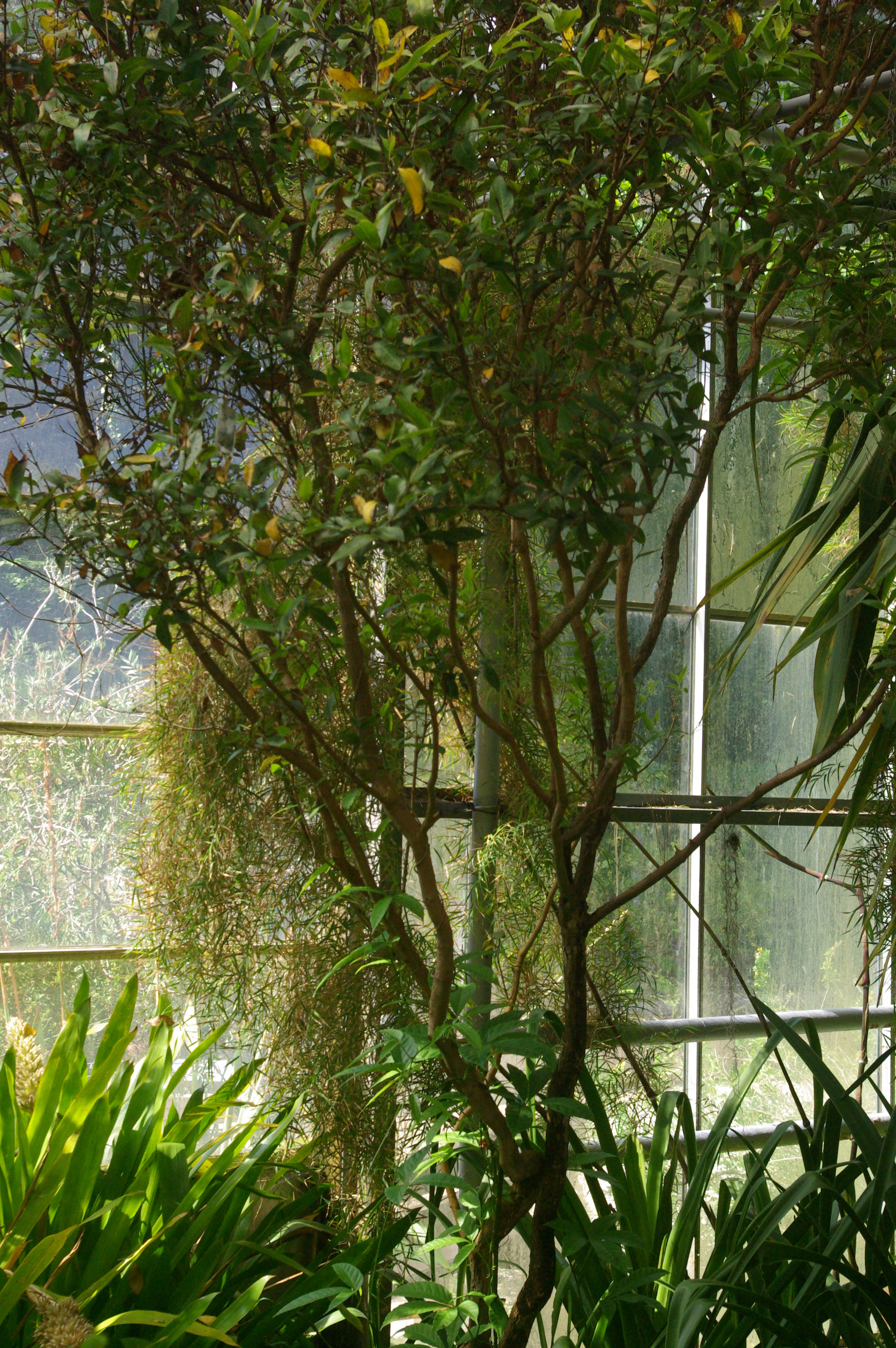
- Tetrataxis salicifolia, Conservatoire botanique national de Brest

Conservation status
- Critically Endangered (IUCN 2.3)

Scientific classification
- Kingdom: Plantae
- Clade: Tracheophytes
- Clade: Angiosperms
- Clade: Eudicots
- Clade: Rosids
- Order: Myrtales
- Family: Lythraceae
- Genus: Tetrataxis; Hook.f.
- Species: T. salicifolia

Binomial name
- Tetrataxis salicifolia (Thouars ex Tul.) Baker

Synonyms
- Tetradia salicifolia Thouars ex Tul.

= Tetrataxis =

Species of plant

Tetrataxis is a genus of plant in family Lythraceae. The sole species is Tetrataxis salicifolia. It is endemic to Mauritius. Its natural habitat is subtropical or tropical dry forests.
