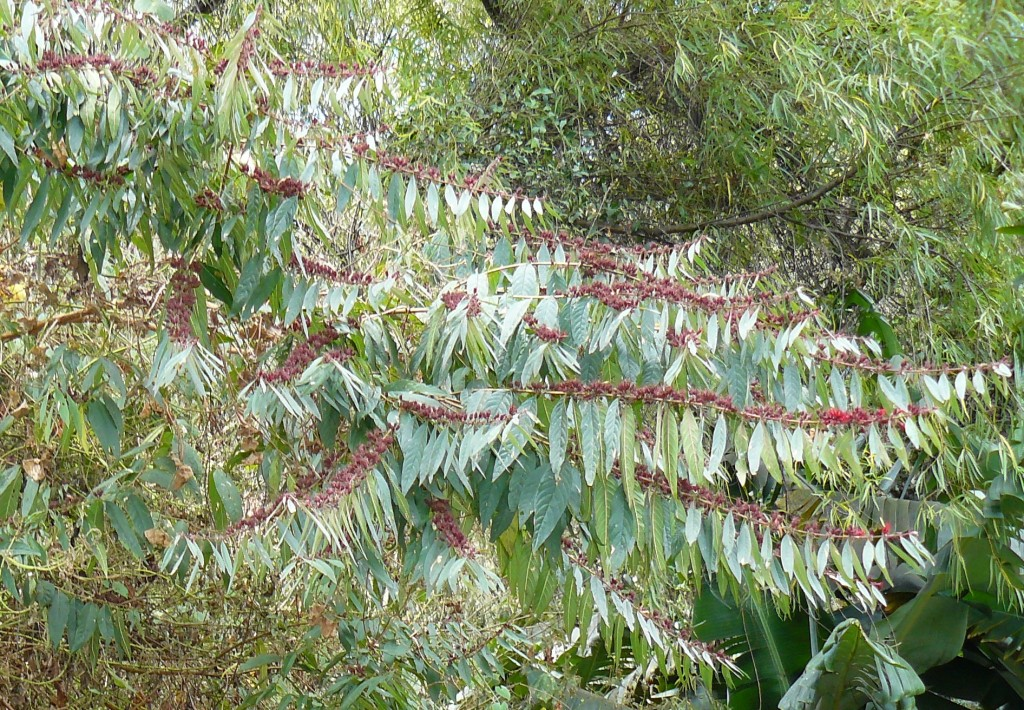
- Pehria compacta, Lythraceae

Scientific classification
- Kingdom: Plantae
- Clade: Tracheophytes
- Clade: Angiosperms
- Clade: Eudicots
- Clade: Rosids
- Order: Myrtales
- Family: Lythraceae
- Genus: Pehria; Sprague
- Species: P. compacta

Binomial name
- Pehria compacta Sprague

Synonyms
- Genus synonymy: Grislea Loefl.; Species synonymy: Grislea compacta Rusby; Grislea herbacea Sessé & Moc.

= Pehria compacta =

Species of flowering plant

Pehria is a monotypic genus of plant in family Lythraceae. It has one known synonym, Grislea Loefl.. The genus just contains one known species, Pehria compacta (Rusby) Sprague

Its native range stretches from Central America down to Venezuela. It is found in Colombia, Honduras and Nicaragua.

== Description ==
They are shrubs or small trees, reaching up to 1.5–6 m (5–20 ft) tall. The leaves, the flowers and young stems are tinged with wine-red. They are puberulent (covered with minute soft erect hairs), with conspicuous glandular, globose, orange or black spots. The leaves have petioles (stalks) which are 3–10 mm (0.1–0.4 in) long. The blades are narrowly elliptical, oblong or lanceolate, 5–14 cm (2–6 in) long and 1–5 cm (0.4–2.0 in) wide. The apex (end of the leaf) is acuminate and the base is narrowly attenuated (narrows gradually). The inflorescences appear in axillary, cymose, compound, lax racemes, which are placed at the ends of the branches. The flowers have four red, petals which are dotted-glandular. The fruit (or seed capsule) is elongated, dry, dehiscent (breaks open at maturity to release contents), wrapped in the persistent floral tube, with 1 mm (0.04 in) long seeds.

== Taxonomy ==
The genus name of Pehria is in honour of Pehr Löfling (1729–1756), a Swedish botanist and an apostle of Carl Linnaeus. The Latin specific epithet of compacta refers to compactus meaning dense or joined together. both the genus and the species were first described and published in J. Bot. Vol.61 on page 238 in 1923.

== Habitat ==
It is found in pastures, grasslands, at the edge of forests and on the banks of roads and rivers, at elevations of 100–1,500 m (300–4,900 ft) above sea level.

Birds have been observed in Venezuela eating the fruit of the plant.
