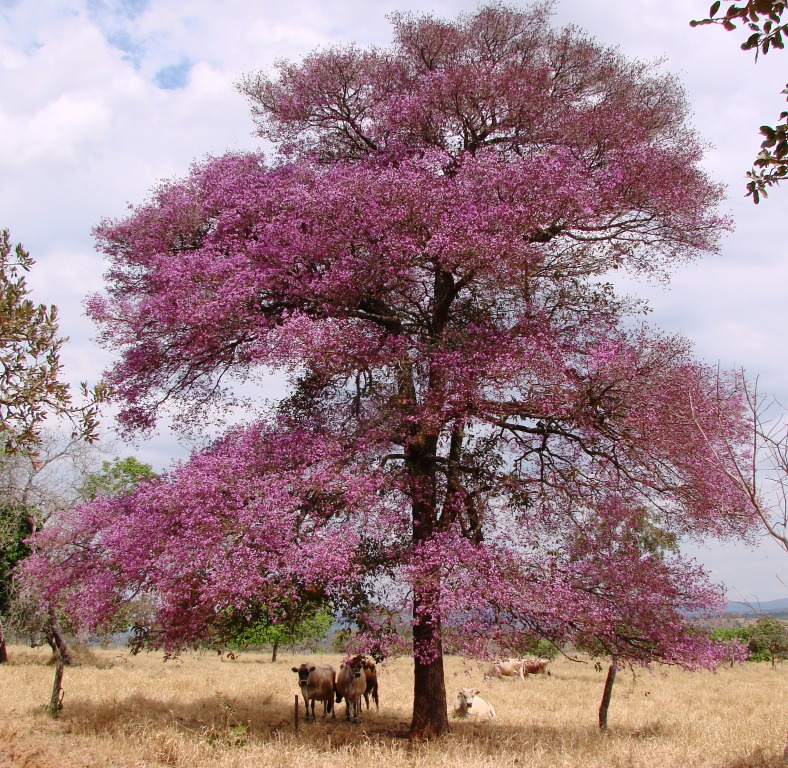

Scientific classification
- Kingdom: Plantae
- Clade: Tracheophytes
- Clade: Angiosperms
- Clade: Eudicots
- Clade: Rosids
- Order: Myrtales
- Family: Lythraceae
- Genus: Physocalymma; Pohl
- Species: P. scaberrimum

Binomial name
- Physocalymma scaberrimum Pohl

= Physocalymma =

Genus of plants

Physocalymma is a monotypic genus of flowering plants belonging to the family Lythraceae. The only species is Physocalymma scaberrimum.

Its native range is Ecuador to Bolivia and Western Brazil.
