= Koehneria =

Scientific classification
- Kingdom: Plantae
- Clade: Tracheophytes
- Clade: Angiosperms
- Clade: Eudicots
- Clade: Rosids
- Order: Myrtales
- Family: Lythraceae
- Genus: Koehneria; S.A.Graham, Tobe & Baas
- Species: K. madagascariensis

Binomial name
- Koehneria madagascariensis (Baker) S.A.Graham, Tobe & Baas

Synonyms
- Lagerstroemia madagascariensis Baker; Murtughas madagascariensis (Baker) Kuntze; Pemphis madagascariensis (Baker) Koehne; Pemphis punctata Drake

Genus of plants

Koehneria is a monotypic genus of flowering plants belonging to the family Lythraceae. The only species is Koehneria madagascariensis (Baker) S.A.Graham, Tobe & Baas

It is native to Madagascar.

The genus name of Koehneria is in honour of Bernhard Adalbert Emil Koehne (1848–1918), a German botanist and dendrologist born near Striegau, a town known today as Strzegom, Poland, The Latin specific epithet of madagascariensis means "coming from Madagascar", and both genus and species were first described and published in Ann. Missouri Bot. Gard. Vol.73 on pages 805–806 in (1986 publ. 1987).
