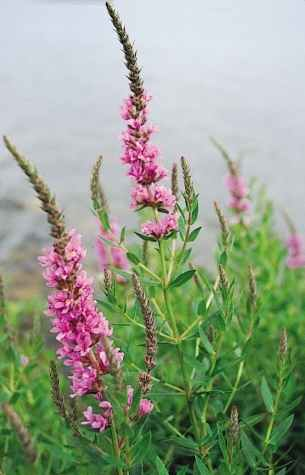
- Lythrum salicaria

Scientific classification
- Kingdom: Plantae
- Clade: Embryophytes
- Clade: Tracheophytes
- Clade: Spermatophytes
- Clade: Angiosperms
- Clade: Eudicots
- Clade: Rosids
- Order: Myrtales
- Family: Lythraceae; J.St.-Hil.

Genera
- 28 – see text

Synonyms
- Sonneratiaceae Engl. & Gilg; Trapaceae

= Lythraceae =

Lythraceae Temporal range: Campanian - recent

Family of flowering plants

Lythraceae is a family of flowering plants that includes 28 genera and about 620 species of herbs, shrubs, and trees. The larger genera include Cuphea (275 spp.), Lagerstroemia (56), Nesaea (50), Rotala (45), and Lythrum (35). It also includes the members of the former families of the pomegranate (Punica granatum, formerly in Punicaceae) and of the water caltrop (Trapa natans, formerly in Trapaceae). Lythraceae has a worldwide distribution, with most species in the tropics, but ranging into temperate climate regions as well.

The family is named after the type genus, Lythrum, the loosestrifes (e.g. Lythrum salicaria purple loosestrife) and also includes henna (Lawsonia inermis). It now includes the pomegranate, formerly classed in a separate family Punicaceae. The family also includes the widely cultivated crape myrtle trees. Botanically, the leaves are usually in pairs (opposite), and the flower petals emerge from the rim of the calyx tube. The petals often appear crumpled.

== Characteristics ==
Lythraceae species are most often herbs, and less often shrubs or trees; the shrubs and trees often have flaky bark. Traits shared by species within the Lythraceae that distinguish them from belonging to other plant families are the petals being crumpled in the bud and the many-layered outer integument of the seed.

=== Leaves ===
The leaves generally have an opposite arrangement, but sometimes are whorled or alternate. They are simple with smooth margins and pinnate venation. Stipules are typically reduced, appearing as a row of minute hairs, or absent.

=== Flowers ===
The flowers are bisexual, radially or occasionally bilaterally symmetric, with a well-developed hypanthium. The flowers are most commonly quadimerous but can be heximerous, with four to eight sepals and petals. The sepals may be distinct, partially fused to form a tube, or touching without overlapping. The petals are crumpled in the bud and wrinkled at maturity, and are typically distinct and overlapping; they are occasionally absent. Usually, twice as many stamens as petals are seen, arranged in two whorls, and the stamens are often unequal in length. Occasionally, the stamens are reduced to one whorl, or are more numerous with multiple whorls. The ovary is typically superior, infrequently semi-inferior, or rarely inferior. The two to many carpels can be fused together (syncarpous), with two to numerous ovules in each locule, with axile placentation of the ovules.

Heterostyly – the presence of two (distylous) or three (tristylous) distinct flower morphs within a species differing in the lengths of the pistil and stamens – is common within the Lythraceae.

=== Fruits and seeds ===
The fruit is usually a dry, dehiscent capsule, occasionally a berry. The seeds are usually flattened and/or winged, with a multilayered outer integument. Epidermal hairs that expand and become mucilaginous when wet are found in about half the genera.

== Distribution ==
The Lythraceae are widely distributed, but with most species tropical and some temperate. They are absent from the Sahara and most arid regions of Australia. Many species occur in aquatic or semi-aquatic habitats (Decodon, Didiplis, Rotala, Sonneratia, Trapa). The oldest fossils of the family are pollen from the Late Cretaceous (Campanian) of Wyoming in western North America, around 82 to 81 million years old.

== Economic importance ==
Edible crops include the pomegranate (Punica granatum) and the water caltrop (Trapa bicornis or T. natans). The pomegranate is cultivated for the fleshy arils surrounding the seeds, and the water caltrop for its seeds. Henna (Lawsonia inermis) is cultivated for the dye of the same name, derived from its leaves.

Ornamentals are grown from a number of genera, including Cuphea, Lagerstroemia (crape myrtles), and Lythrum (loosestrifes).

Purple loosestrife (Lythrum salicaria) is an invasive exotic weed of wetlands throughout Canada and the United States.

== Taxonomy ==
Within the order Myrtales, the family Lythraceae is most closely related to the Onagraceae, with the Combretaceae sister to both families. Molecular phylogeny work has led to the inclusion of the formerly recognized families Duabangaceae, Punicaceae, Sonneratiaceae, and Trapaceae.

=== Genera ===
Lythraceae consists of 28 genera in five subfamilies:

Subfamily Lythroideae de Jussieu ex Walker-Arnott, 1832 — (formerly Lythraceae sensu stricto)

- Adenaria Kunth
- Ammannia L. — (syn. Crenea Aubl., Hionanthera A.Fern. & Diniz, and Nesaea Comm. ex Kunth)
- Capuronia Lourteig
- Cuphea P.Browne
- Decodon J.F.Gmel.
- Didiplis Raf.
- Diplusodon Pohl
- Galpinia N.E.Br.
- Ginoria Jacq. — (syn. Haitia Urb.)
- Gyrosphragma T.B.Cavalc. & Facco
- Heimia Link
- Koehneria S.A.Graham, Tobe & Baas
- Lafoensia Vand.
- Lagerstroemia L.
- Lawsonia L.
- Lourtella S.A.Graham, Baas & Tobe
- Lythrum L.
- Pehria Sprague
- Pemphis J.R.Forst. & G.Forst.
- Physocalymma Pohl
- Pleurophora D.Don
- Rotala L.
- Tetrataxis Hook.f.
- Woodfordia Salisb.

Subfamily Punicoideae (Horan. 1834) S. A. Graham, Thorne & Reveal 1998 — (syn. Punicaceae)

- Punica L.

Subfamily Sonneratioideae (Engl. & Gilg 1924) S. A. Graham, Thorne & Reveal 1998

- Sonneratia L.f.

Subfamily Duabangoideae (Takht. 1986) S. A. Graham, Thorne & Reveal 1998 — (syn. Duabangaceae)

- Duabanga Buch.-Ham.

Subfamily Trapoideae Voigt 1845 — (syn. Trapaceae)

- Trapa L.

Incertae sedis

- †Shirleya Pigg & DeVore — (Miocene, Washington state)

== Gallery ==
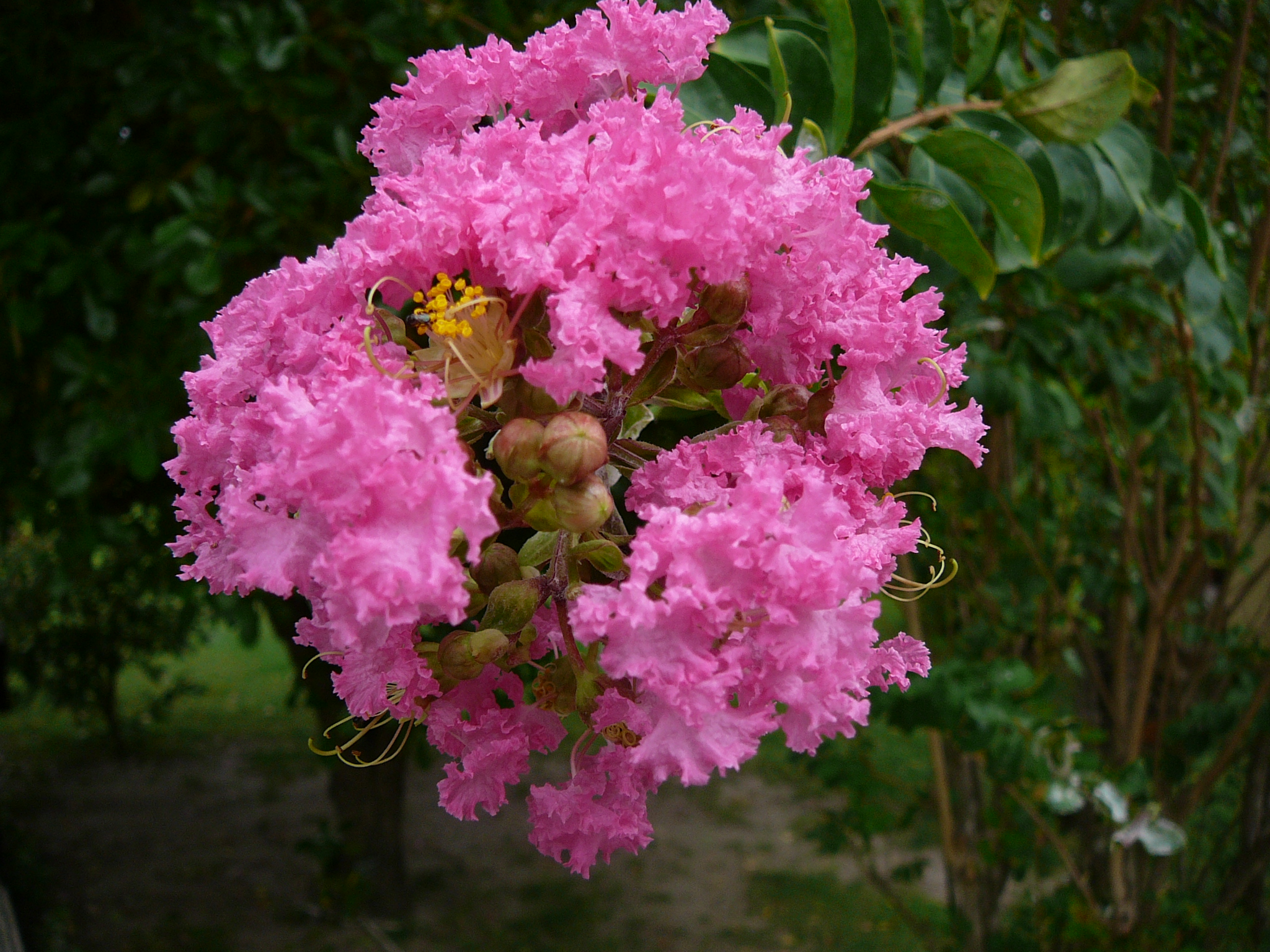
Crepe myrtle

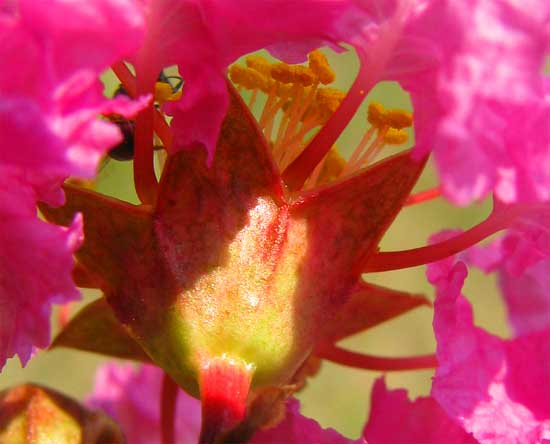
Crepe myrtle flowers - the petals emerge from the calyx tube.

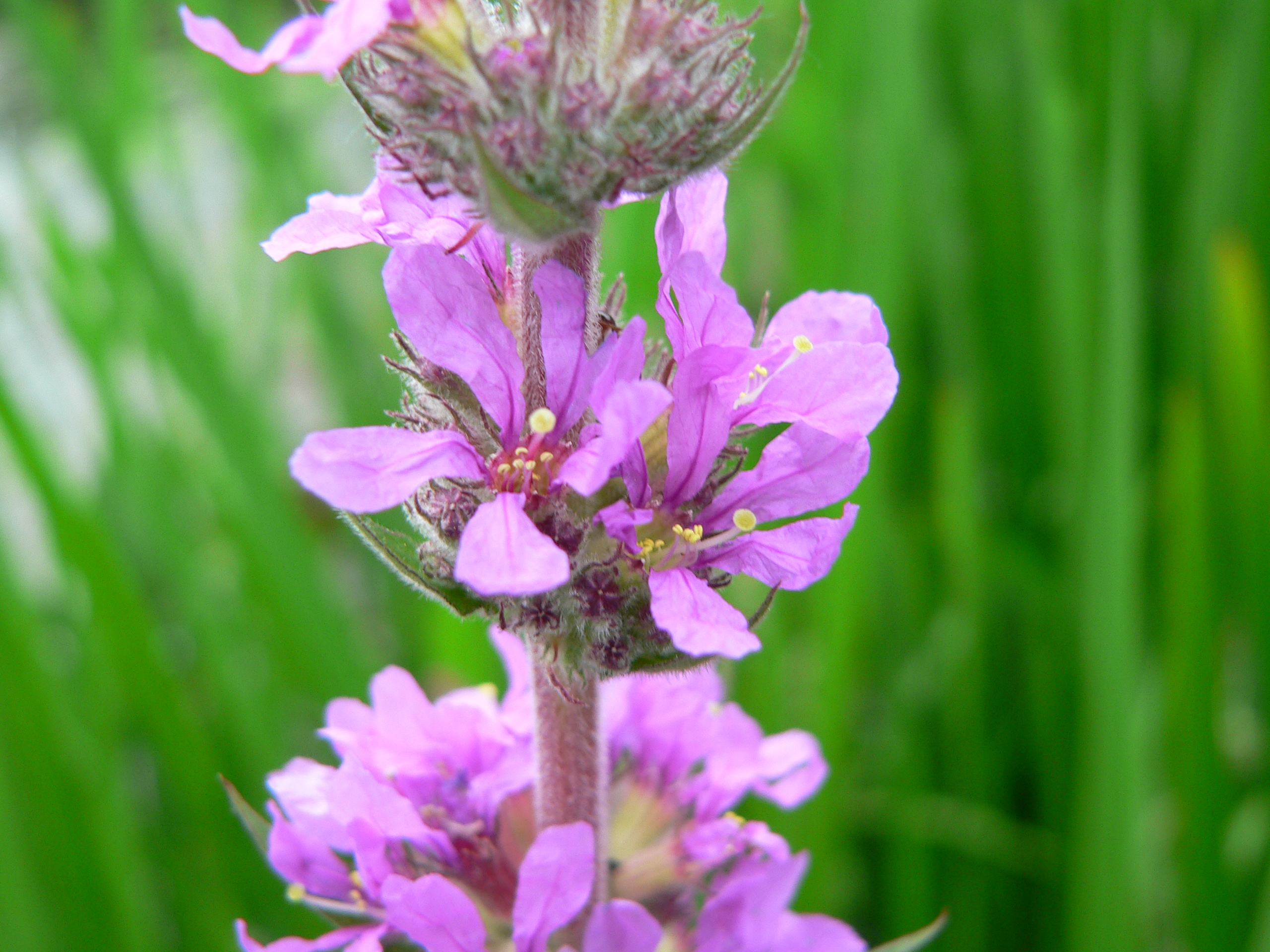
Lythrum salicaria

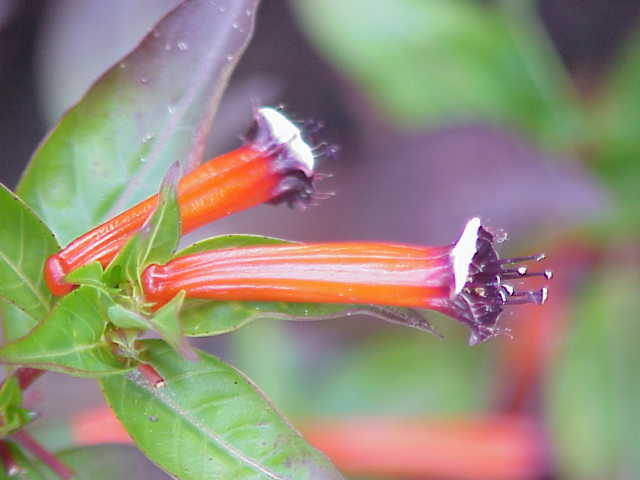
Cuphea ignea

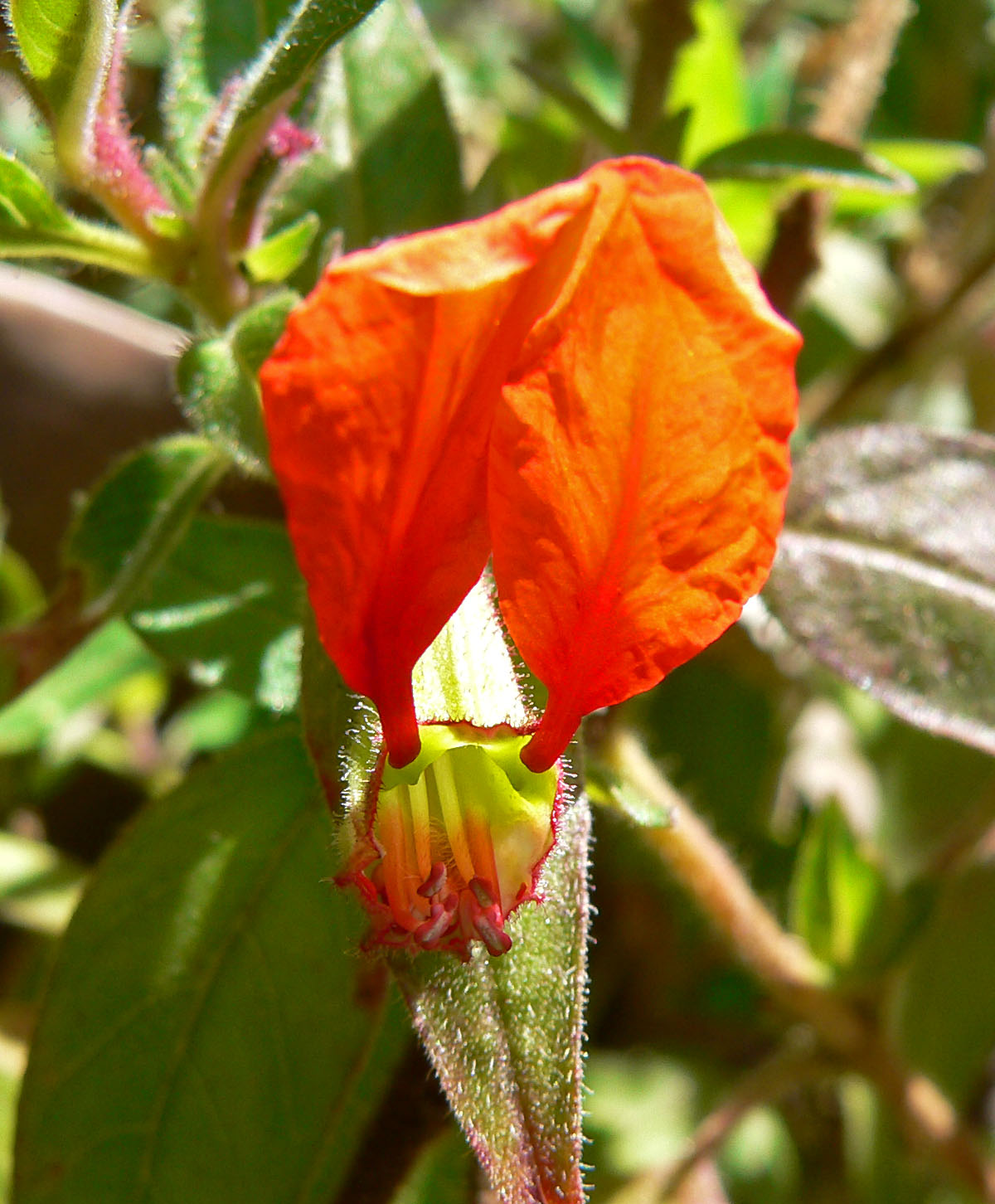
Cuphea nudicostata

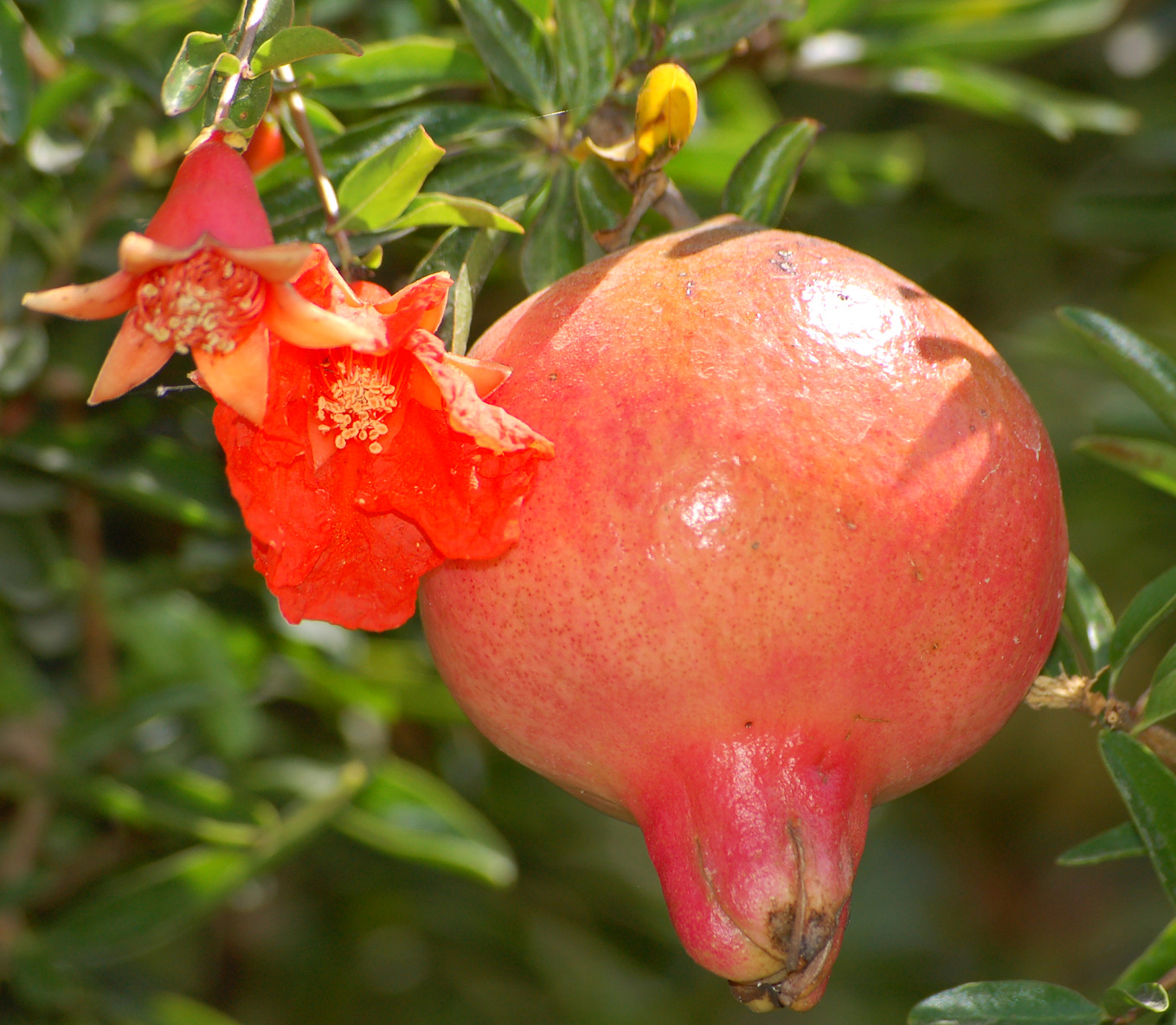
Pomegranate

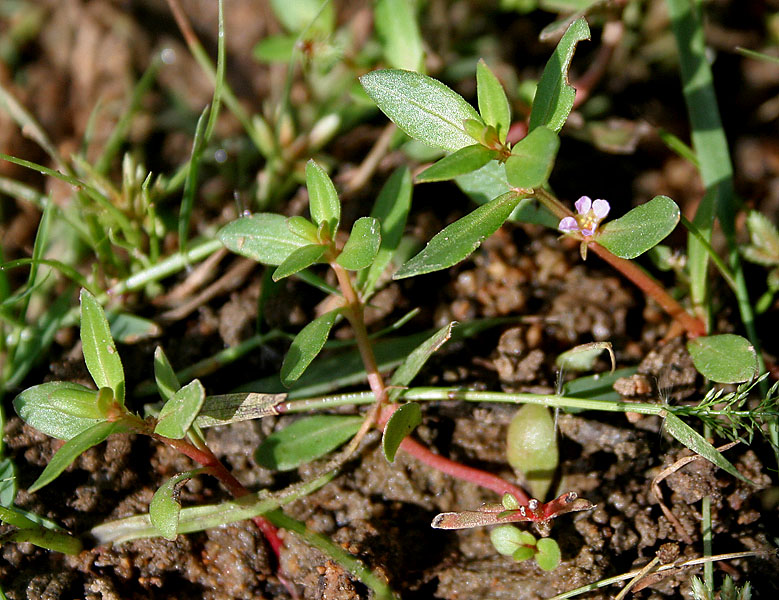
Rotala species
