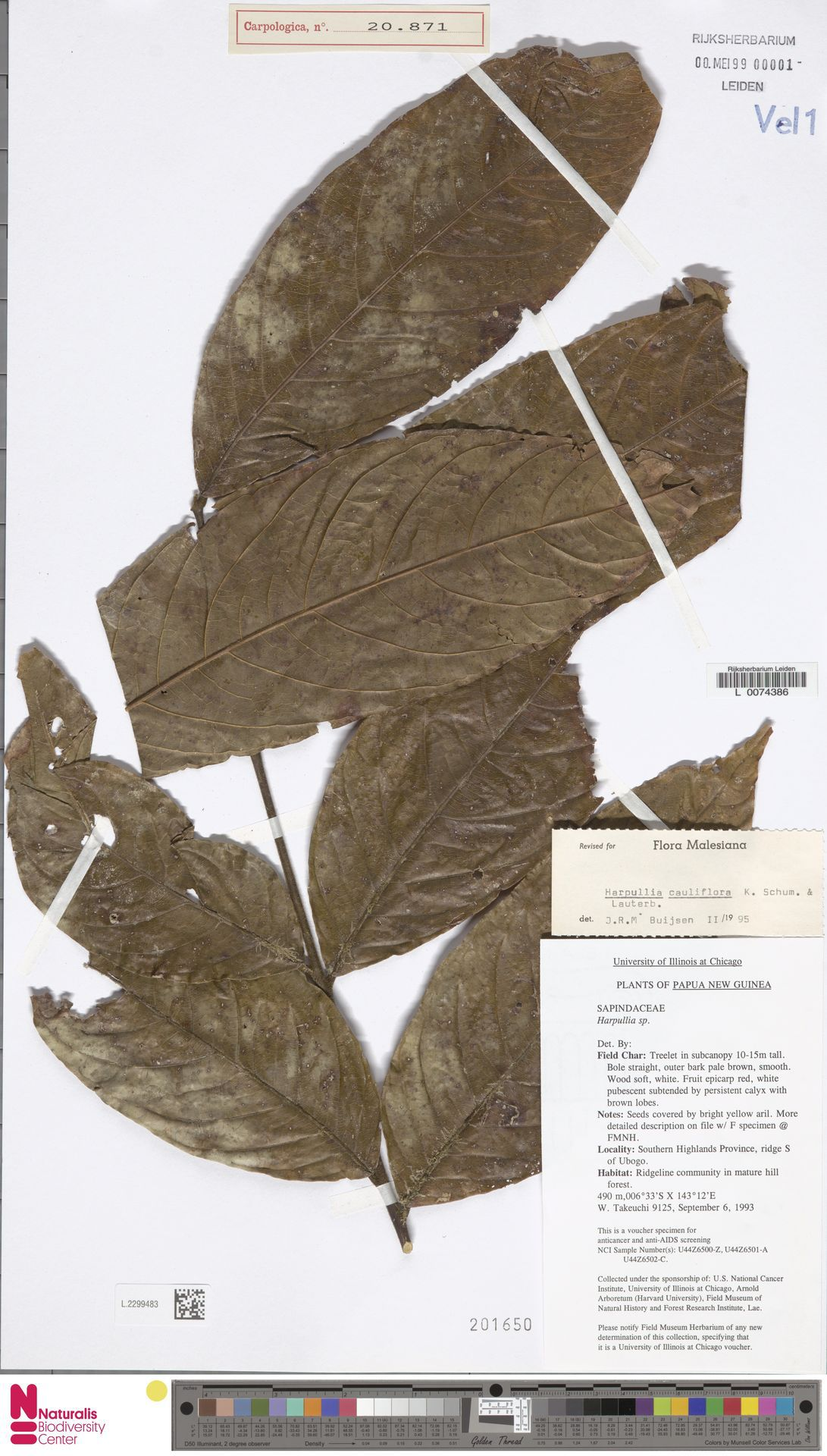
- L.2299483_58032769; Naturalis Biodiversity Center

Scientific classification
- Kingdom: Plantae
- Clade: Tracheophytes
- Clade: Angiosperms
- Clade: Eudicots
- Clade: Rosids
- Order: Sapindales
- Family: Sapindaceae
- Genus: Harpullia
- Species: H. cauliflora

Binomial name
- Harpullia cauliflora K.Schum. & Lauterb.
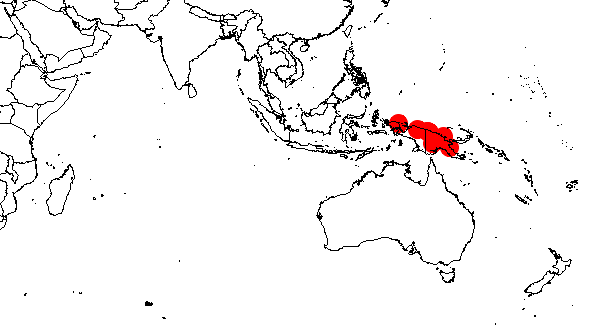
- Occurrence data from AVH

= Harpullia cauliflora =

Species of flowering plant

Harpullia cauliflora is a plant in the family Sapindaceae found in New Guinea. It was first described by Karl Moritz Schumann and Carl Adolf Georg Lauterbach in 1900.
