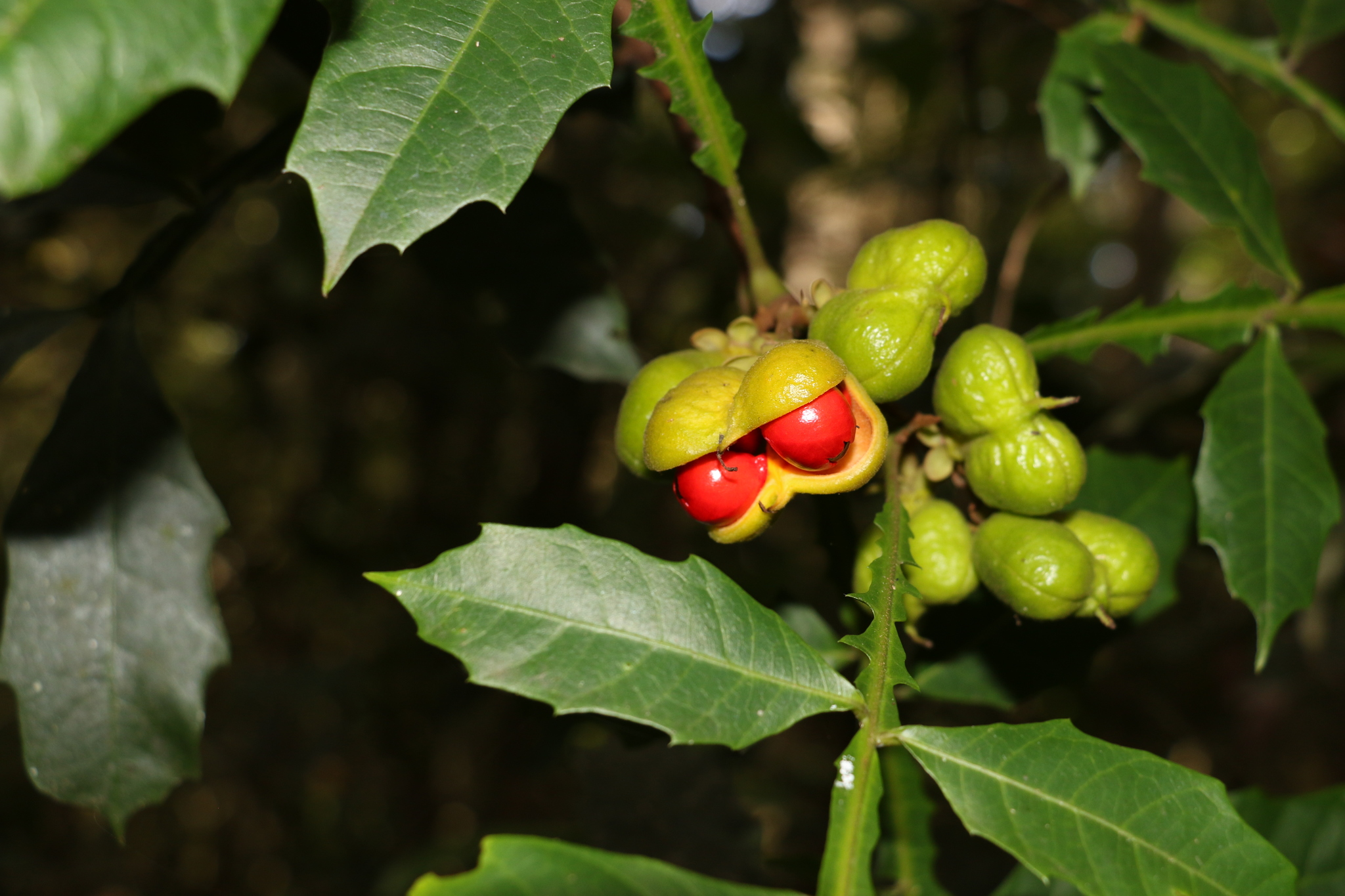

Scientific classification
- Kingdom: Plantae
- Clade: Tracheophytes
- Clade: Angiosperms
- Clade: Eudicots
- Clade: Rosids
- Order: Sapindales
- Family: Sapindaceae
- Genus: Harpullia
- Species: H. alata

Binomial name
- Harpullia alata F.Muell.
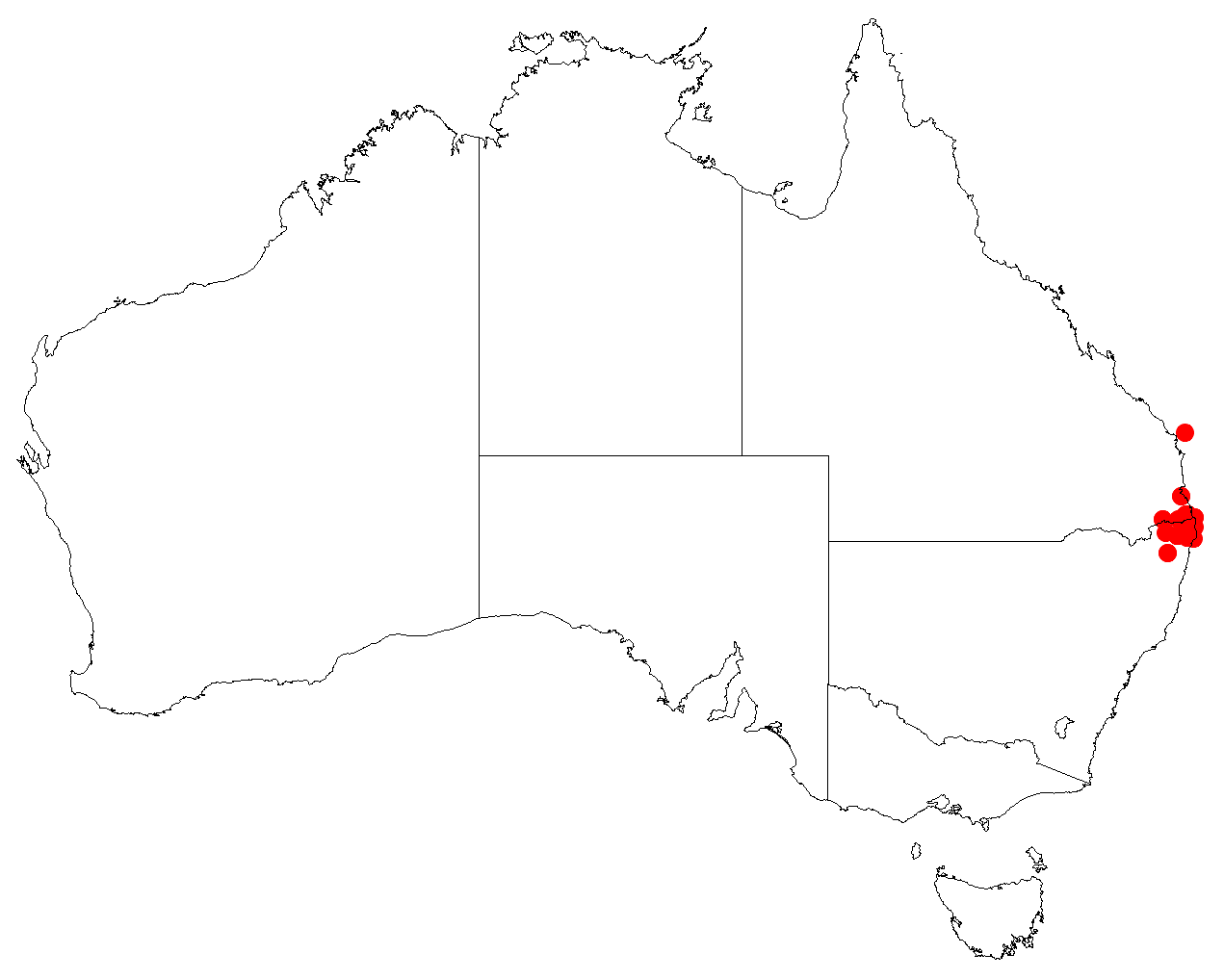
- Occurrence data from AVH

Synonyms
- Harpulia alata F.Muell. orth. var.; Harpullia frutescens auct. non F.M.Bailey: White, C.T. (1911)

= Harpullia alata =

Species of flowering plant

Harpullia alata, commonly known as winged tulip or wing-leaved tulip, is a species of flowering plant in the family Sapindaceae, and is endemic to eastern Australia. It is a tree with paripinnate leaves, the leaflets elliptic with teeth on the edges, white flowers and capsules containing a seed with a yellow to reddish aril.

== Description ==
Harpullia alata is a tree that typically grows to a height of up to 4 m (13 ft), its new growth covered with rusty hairs. Its leaves are paripinnate, 100–350 mm (3.9–13.8 in) long with 6 to 10 elliptic to lance shaped leaflets with the narrower end towards the base, mostly 50–150 mm (2.0–5.9 in) long and 20–50 mm (0.79–1.97 in) wide on a winged petiole 30–80 mm (1.2–3.1 in) long. The flowers are borne in racemes in leaf axils and are 50–140 mm (2.0–5.5 in) long. The sepals are 7 mm (0.28 in) long and covered with downy hairs, the petals are white and 12 mm (0.47 in) long, there are 8 stamens, and the ovary covered with soft hairs. The fruit is a sessile, broadly oval, yellowish capsule 18–24 mm (0.71–0.94 in) long containing two shiny chestnut brown seeds, nearly enclosed in a yellow to reddish aril.

This is the only Australian Harpullia species that has dentate margins on the leaflets and wings on the leaf stem.

== Taxonomy and naming ==
Harpullia alata was first formally described in 1860 by Victorian government botanist Ferdinand von Mueller from a specimen collected by Dr Hermann Beckler "in woods" near the Clarence River in New South Wales. The species epithet, alata, is a Latin adjective meaning "winged", and refers to the winged petiole. The type specimen is held at Kew (K) k000701234.

== Distribution and habitat ==
Winged tulip grows in rainforest at high altitudes in gullies and steep slopes from the McPherson Ranges in southern Queensland where it is quite common, to the Clarence River in northern New South Wales.
