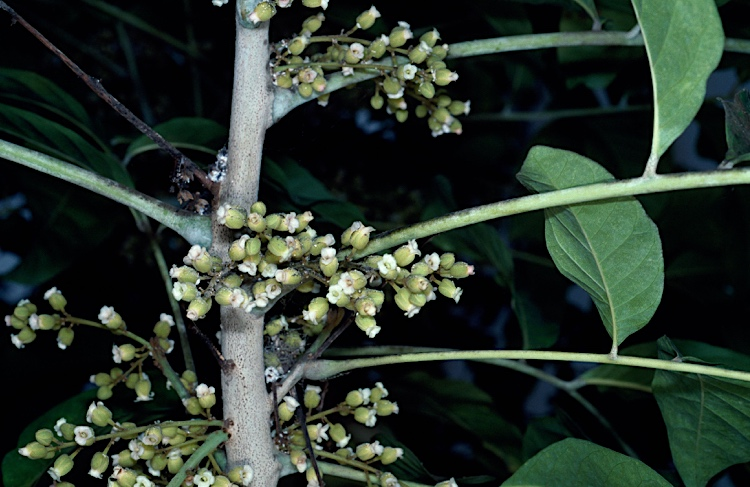
- Flowers and leaves

Conservation status
- Least Concern (IUCN 3.1)

Scientific classification
- Kingdom: Plantae
- Clade: Embryophytes
- Clade: Tracheophytes
- Clade: Angiosperms
- Clade: Eudicots
- Clade: Rosids
- Order: Sapindales
- Family: Sapindaceae
- Genus: Harpullia
- Species: H. arborea

Binomial name
- Harpullia arborea (Blanco) Radlk.

Synonyms
- List: Ptelea arborea Blanco Harpullia blancoi Fern.-Vill. Harpullia condorensis Pierre Harpullia divaricata Radlk. Harpullia glanduligera Radlk. Harpullia imbricata Thwaites Harpullia mellea Lauterb. Harpullia pedicellaris Radlk. Harpullia sphaeroloba Radlk. Harpullia tomentosa Ridl. Otonychium imbricatum Blume Streptostigma viridiflora Thwaites

= Harpullia arborea =

Species of flowering plant

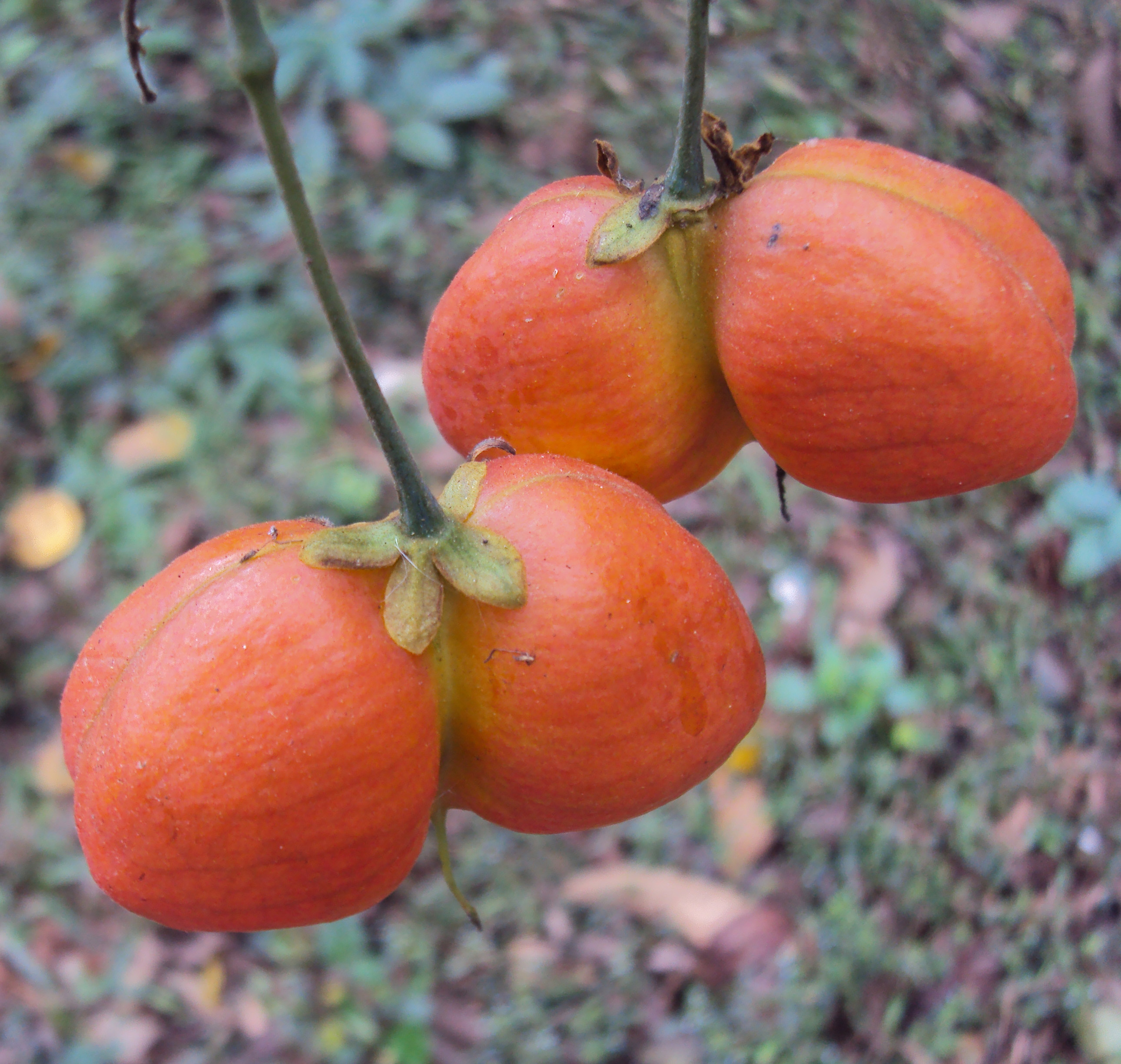
Fruit

Harpullia arborea, commonly known as Cooktown tulipwood in Australia, is species of flowering plant in the family Sapindaceae is native to the Indian subcontinent, Sri Lanka throughout Mainland Southeast Asia and Malesia to Queensland in Australia and the Western Pacific. It is a tree with paripinnate leaves with 6 to 10 leaflets, small pink or pale green flowers arranged in leaf axils or on old woody stems, and orange-yellow to red capsules containing shiny black seeds.

== Description ==
Harpullia arborea is a tree that typically grows to a height of up to 30 m (98 ft), sometimes to 40 m (130 ft), with a trunk dbh of 60–70 cm (24–28 in), its branchlets covered with woolly brown hairs. Its leaves are paripinnate, 40–220 mm (1.6–8.7 in) long with 6 to 10 elliptic to egg-shaped leaflets with the narrower end towards the base, mostly 100–190 mm (3.9–7.5 in) long and 40–75 mm (1.6–3.0 in) wide on a petiole 40–90 mm (1.6–3.5 in) long. Separate male and female flowers are borne on the same plant, usually in racemes in leaf axils, sometimes on old wood, and are 40–220 mm (1.6–8.7 in) long. Each flower is on a pedicel 10–50 mm (0.39–1.97 in) long. The sepals are 6–7 mm (0.24–0.28 in) long and covered with woolly hairs. The petals are pink or pale green and 12–14 mm (0.47–0.55 in) long, there are 5 stamens, and the ovary is covered with soft hairs. The fruit is a broadly heart-shaped, orange-yellow to red capsule 15–23 mm (0.59–0.91 in) long, containing shiny black seeds.

== Taxonomy ==
This species was first formally described in 1837 by Francisco Manuel Blanco who gave it the name Ptelea arborea in his Flora de Filipinas. In 1887, Ludwig Adolph Timotheus Radlkofer transferred the species to Harpullia as H. arborea. The specific epithet (arborea) means 'tree-like'.

== Distribution and habitat ==
Harpullia arborea usually grows in rainforest or monsoon forest in India, Bangladesh, Borneo, Cambodia, Fiji, Indonesia, Peninsular Malaysia, Nepal, New Guinea, the Philippines, Australia, Samoa, the Solomon Islands, Sri Lanka, Thailand, Tonga, Vanuatu and Vietnam. In New Guinea, it has been recorded in Madang, Morobe, the New Guinea Highlands, Milne Bay, New Britain and Bougainville. In Australia, it occurs from the Kutini-Payamu National Park on Cape York Peninsula to Cardwell in north-east Queensland.
