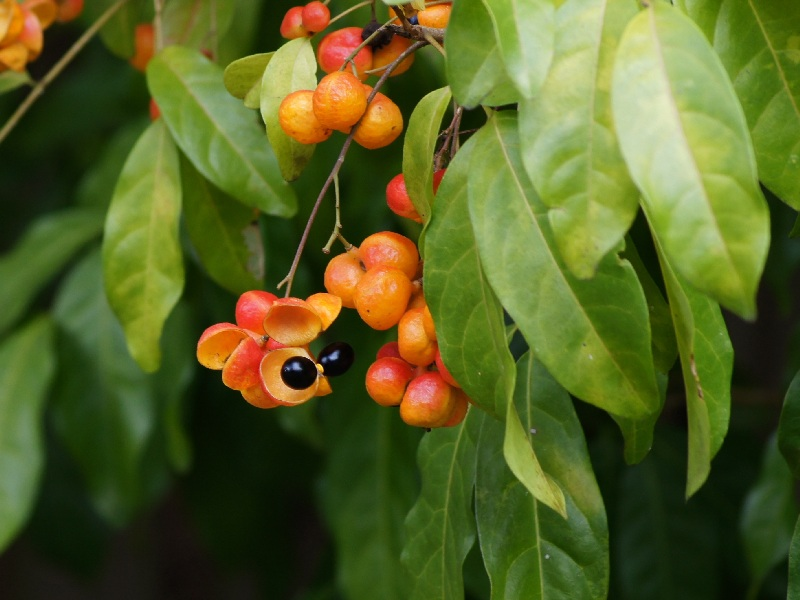
- Harpullia pendula: fruits, seeds and foliage (above), habit (below)

Scientific classification
- Kingdom: Plantae
- Clade: Tracheophytes
- Clade: Angiosperms
- Clade: Eudicots
- Clade: Rosids
- Order: Sapindales
- Family: Sapindaceae
- Subfamily: Dodonaeoideae
- Genus: Harpullia; Roxb.

Type species
- Harpullia cupanioides Roxb.

Species
- See text

= Harpullia =

Genus of trees

Harpullia is a genus of about 27 species of small to medium-sized rainforest trees from the family Sapindaceae. They have a wide distribution ranging from India eastwards through Malesia, Papuasia and Australasia to the Pacific Islands. They grow naturally usually in or on the margins of rainforests or associated vegetation. Plants in the genus Harpullia are usually dioecious shrubs or trees covered with simple or star-shaped hairs. The leaves are paripinnate and the flowers are usually arranged in leaf axils, usually with 5 petals, 5 to 8 stamens and a 2-locular ovary. The fruit is a 2-lobed capsule.

== Description ==
Plants in the genus Harpullia are usually dioecious shrubs or trees, the foliage covered with simple and star-shaped hairs. The leaves are imparipinnate, the leaflets usually arranged alternately and mostly entire, the rhachis and petiole sometimes with a wing. The flowers usually have 5 overlapping sepals free from each other and 5 oblong petals either sessile or with auricles. There are 5 to 8 stamens and a 2-locular ovary with 1 or 2 ovules per locule. There are 1 or 2 shiny black more or less spherical or elliptic seeds per locule, usually with a large aril.

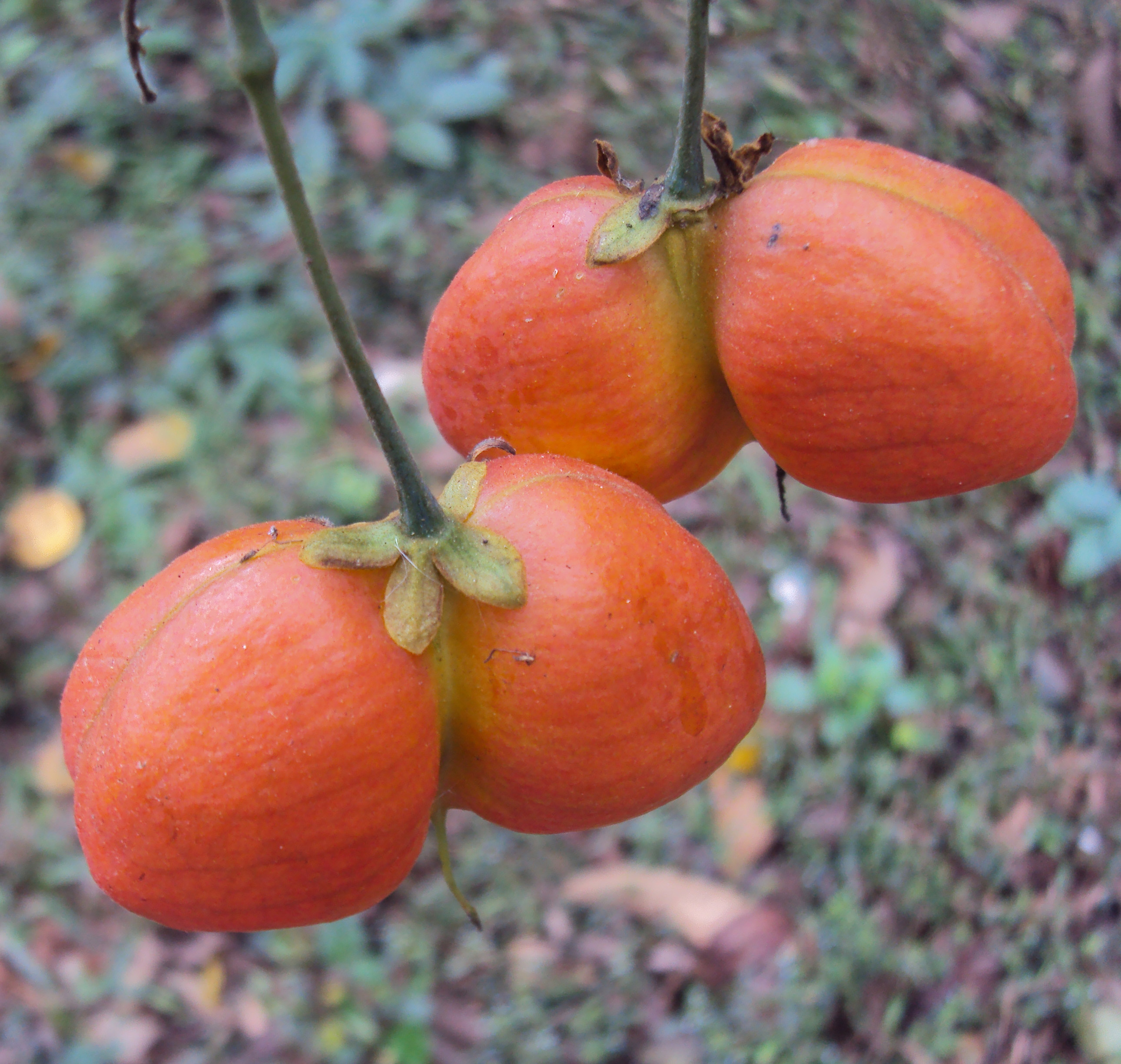
H. arborea fruits

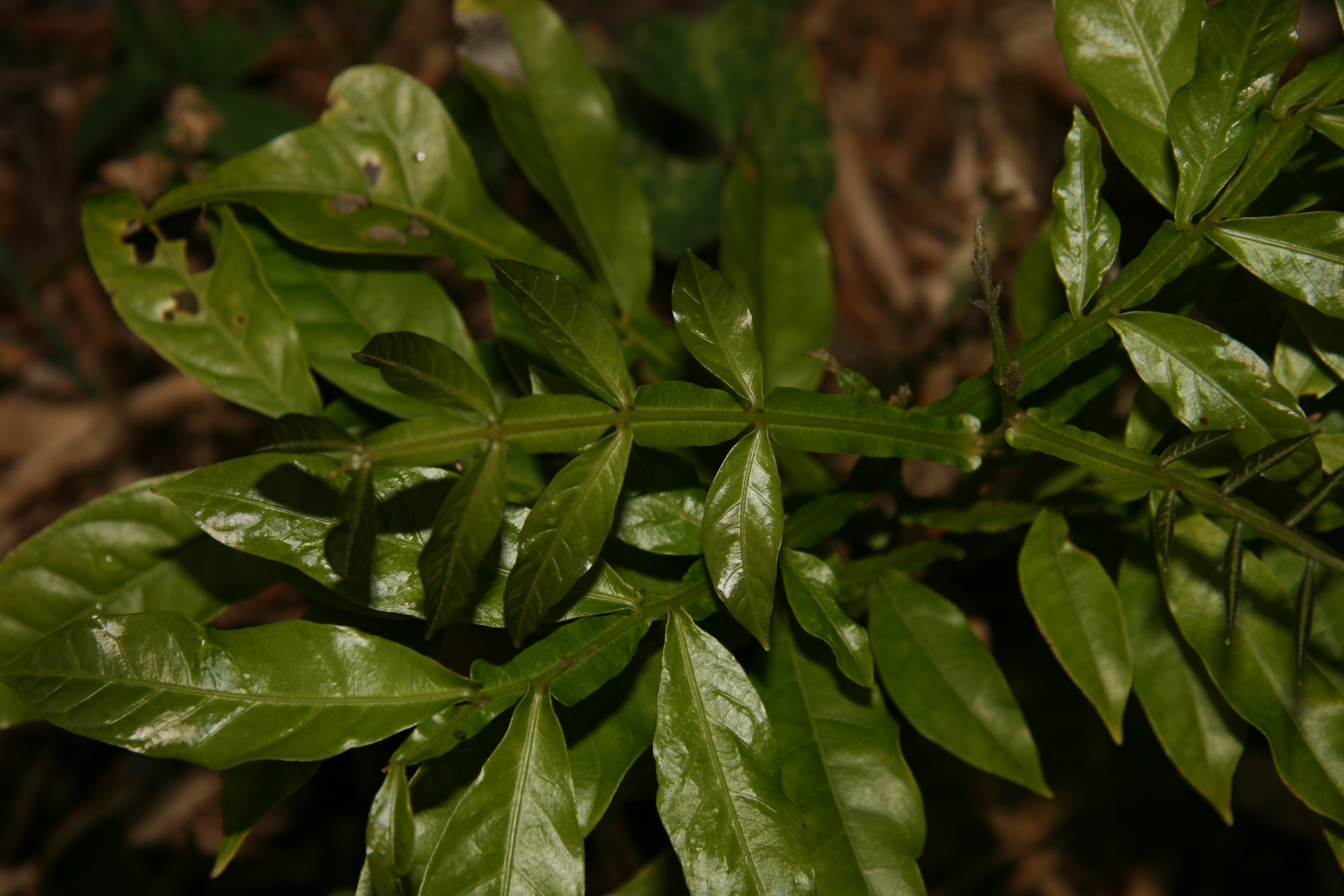
H. frutescens young foliage

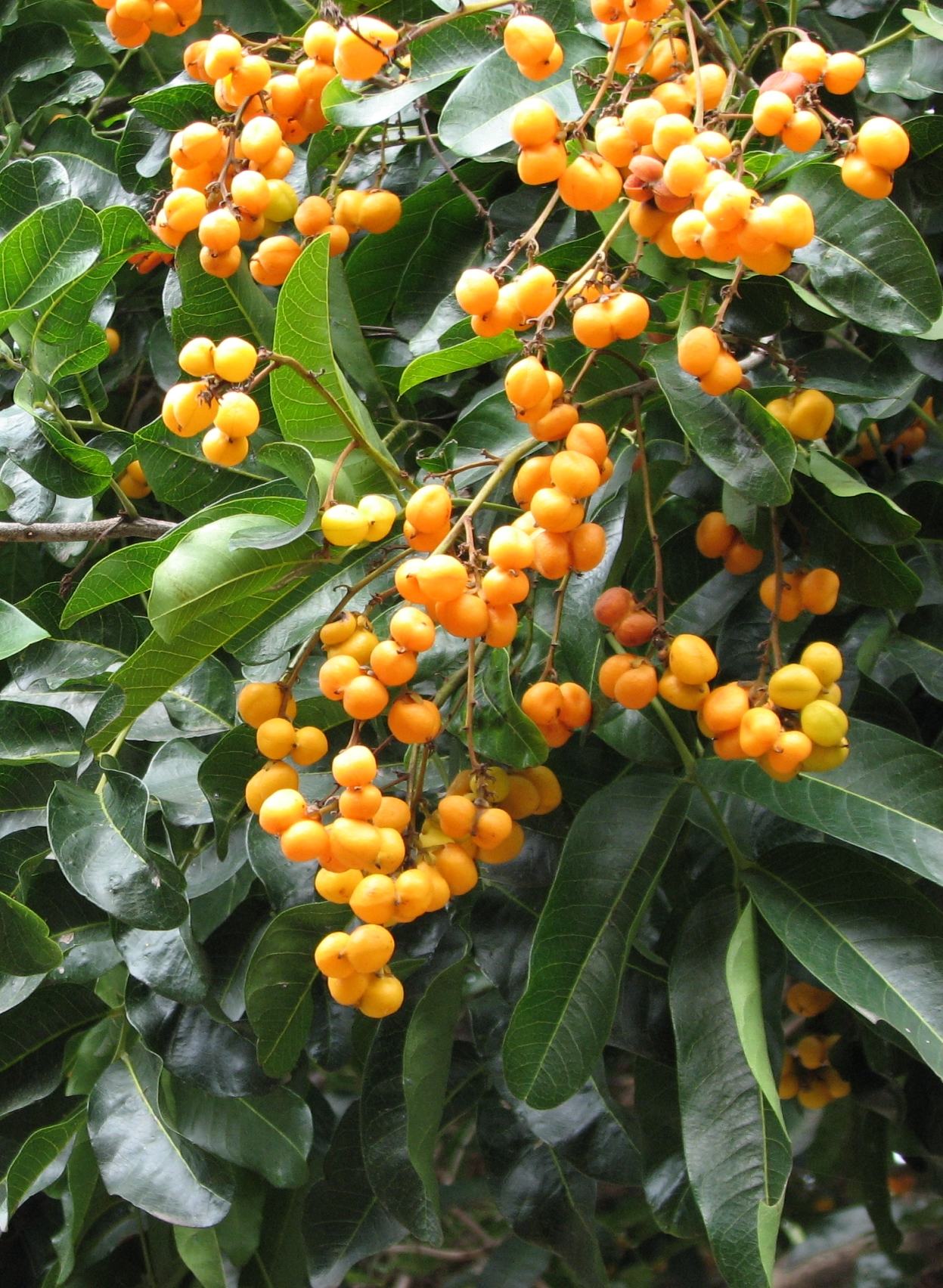
H. hillii fruits and foliage

== Taxonomy ==
The genus Harpullia was first formally described in 1824 by William Roxburgh in his Flora Indica and the first species he described (the type species was Harpullia cupanioides. The genus name (Harpullia) is derived from harpulli, the common name of Harpullia cupanioides.

In 1985, the palynologist Jan Mueller published a pollen anatomy and evolution study of the genus.

In 1985 and 1981 Australian botanist Sally T. Reynolds published updated names, known records and descriptions of the eight Australian species, in the Flora of Australia (series) and her scientific article, respectively.

In 1994, 1985 and 1982 Dutch botanists Pieter Willem Leenhouts and M. Vente published a treatment in Flora Malesiana, a natural species groups classification attempt and a taxonomic revision, respectively.

In 2003 Dutch botanists J.R.M. Buijsen, Peter C. van Welzen and R.W.J.M.van der Ham published a morphological phylogenetics analysis and biogeography study of the whole genus. In 1995 Buijsen published a leaf anatomy study.

In 2011 Japanese–American botanist Wayne Takeuchi formally published the name and description of H. mabberleyana, the "first member of the genus to be discovered in New Guinea since 1940".

=== Species list ===
The following is a list of Harpullia species accepted by Plants of the World Online as at July 2024:

- Harpullia alata F.Muell. (Qld., N.S.W.)
- Harpullia arborea (Blanco) Radlk. (Tropical Asia to South-west Pacific, Qld.)
- Harpullia austrocaledonica Baill. (New Caledonia)
- Harpullia camptoneura Radlk. (New Guinea)
- Harpullia carrii Leenh. (New Guinea)
- Harpullia cauliflora K.Schum. & Lauterb. (New Guinea)
- Harpullia crustacea Radlk. (New Guinea)
- Harpullia cupanioides Roxb. (China, Tropical Asia)
- Harpullia frutescens F.M.Bailey (Qld.)
- Harpullia giganteacapsula Vente (New Guinea)
- Harpullia hillii F.Muell. (Qld., N.S.W.)
- Harpullia hirsuta Radlk. (New Guinea)
- Harpullia largifolia Radlk. (Solomon Islands)
- Harpullia leichhardtii Benth. (Northern Territory)
- Harpullia leptococca Radlk. (New Guinea)
- Harpullia longipetala Leenh. (New Guinea)
- Harpullia mabberleyana W.N.Takeuchi (New Guinea)
- Harpullia myrmecophila Merr. & L.M.Perry (New Guinea)
- Harpullia oococca Radlk. (New Guinea)
- Harpullia peekeliana Melch. (Bismarck Archipelago, Solomon Islands)
- Harpullia pendula Planch. ex F.Muell. (Qld., N.S.W.)
- Harpullia petiolaris Radlk. (Borneo, Moluccas, New Guinea)
- Harpullia ramiflora Radlk. (Philippines, Moluccas, New Guinea, Qld.)
- Harpullia rhachiptera Radlk. (New Guinea)
- Harpullia rhyticarpa C.T.White & W.D.Francis (Qld.)
- Harpullia solomonensis Vente (Solomon Islands, Bismarck Archipelago)
- Harpullia vaga Merr. & L.M.Perry (Solomon Islands, Qld.)

== Distribution and habitat ==
The major centre of diversity, of about twenty species, occurs in New Guinea including its surrounding islands and region.

There are eight species in eastern Australia, six of them endemic. They have the common name tulipwoods and were prized for their dark coloured timber. The one most commonly known to Australian horticulture is Harpullia pendula which is widely planted as a street tree along the east coast. H. frutescens is a small shrub with horticultural potential.
