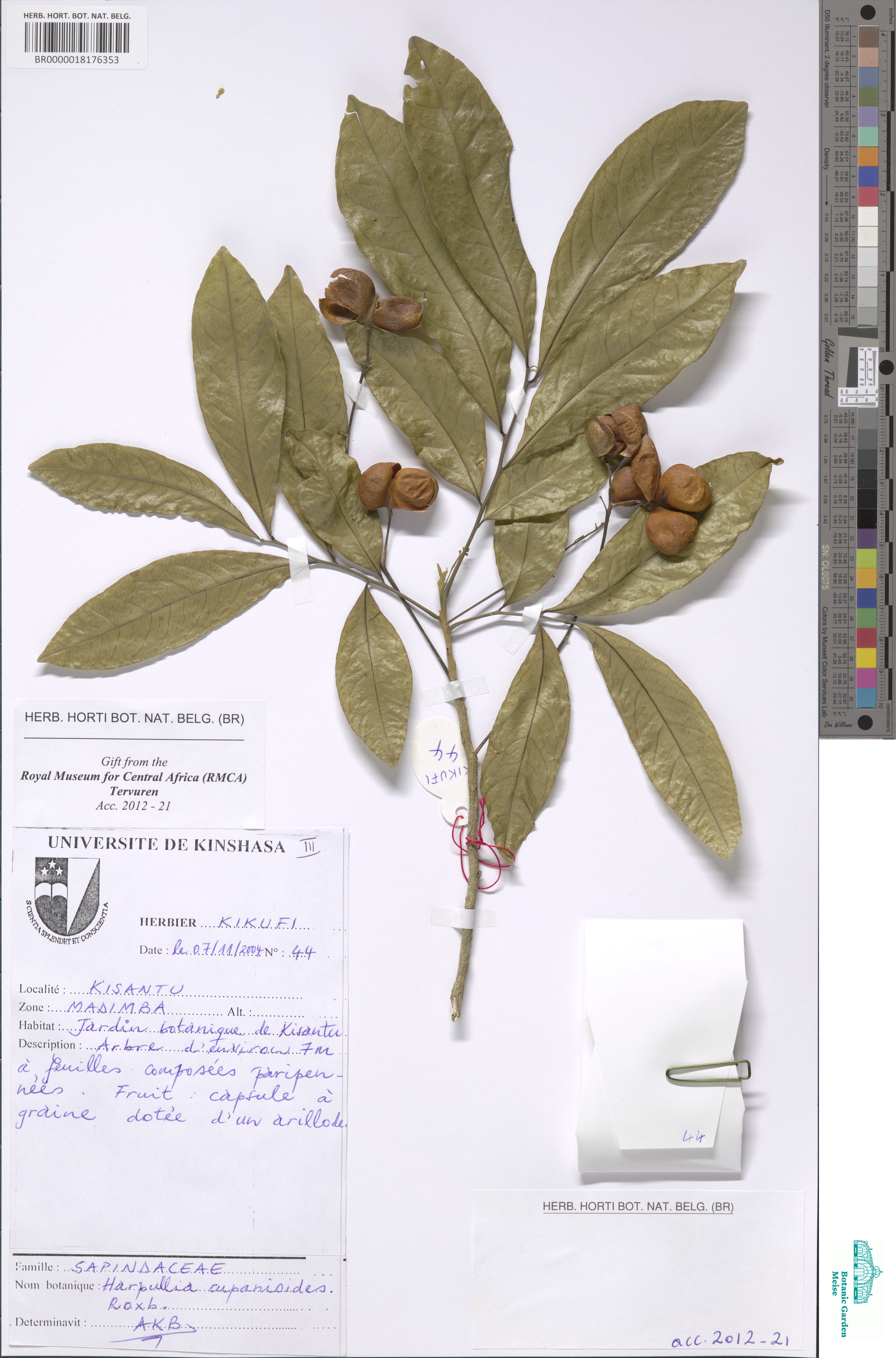
- Meise Botanic Garden BR0000018176353

Scientific classification
- Kingdom: Plantae
- Clade: Tracheophytes
- Clade: Angiosperms
- Clade: Eudicots
- Clade: Rosids
- Order: Sapindales
- Family: Sapindaceae
- Genus: Harpullia
- Species: H. cupanioides

Binomial name
- Harpullia cupanioides Roxb.
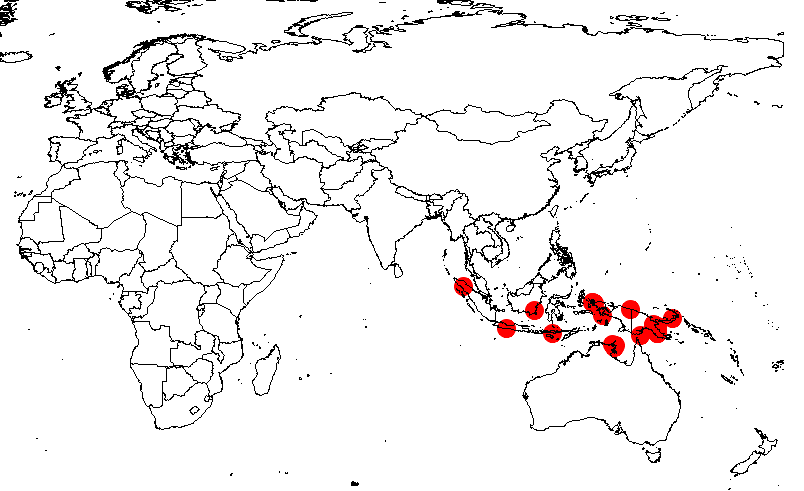
- Occurrence data from AVH

= Harpullia cupanioides =

Species of flowering plant

Harpullia cupanioides is a plant in the Sapindaceae family found in south east Asia: in the Andaman Islands, Assam, Bangladesh, Borneo, Cambodia, Yunnan, Hainan, Jawa, Laos, the Lesser Sunda Islands, Malaysia, Myanmar, New Guinea, Nicobar Islands, the Philippines, the Solomon Islands, Thailand, and Vietnam.

It was first described by William Roxburgh in 1824, and is the type species for Harpullia.

== Description ==
Harpullia cupanioides is a large tree, growing up to 20 m high, sometimes a canopy tree, sometimes a sub-canopy tree. Its bole is cylindrical and up to 70 cm in diameter, buttressed and with no spines, aerial roots, or stilt roots. Its bark is brown or grey, and rough with slightly vertical fissures. The terminal buds are not enclosed by leaves. There are no complex hairs, nor stinging hairs.

The leaves are arranged spirally up branchlets. They are compound, not winged and have a petiole and have mostly up to six leaflets. The leaflets are broadest below the middle, and 11.0-14.5 cm by 4.5-5.5 cm and are slightly asymmetric and alternate, with pinnate venation. Their lower surface is pale green or green, while the upper surface is a glossy green (with no covering, no domatia, and no stipules).

The inflorescence is axillary. The flowers are stalked and bisexual, stalked, with five axes of symmetry. They are 7.0-9.0 mm long with a diameter of up to10 mm. There are distinct whorls of sepals and petals. The inner perianth is greenish white or green. There are five stamens which are free of each other and free of the perianth. The ovary is superior.

The fruits occur on a branched axis, with each fruit being 15.0-20.0 mm long, orange, not fleshy, and openi at maturity to release their contents. The capsule is 2-valved. The seed are not winged, are as wide as they are long and are from 1–10 mm in diameter.
