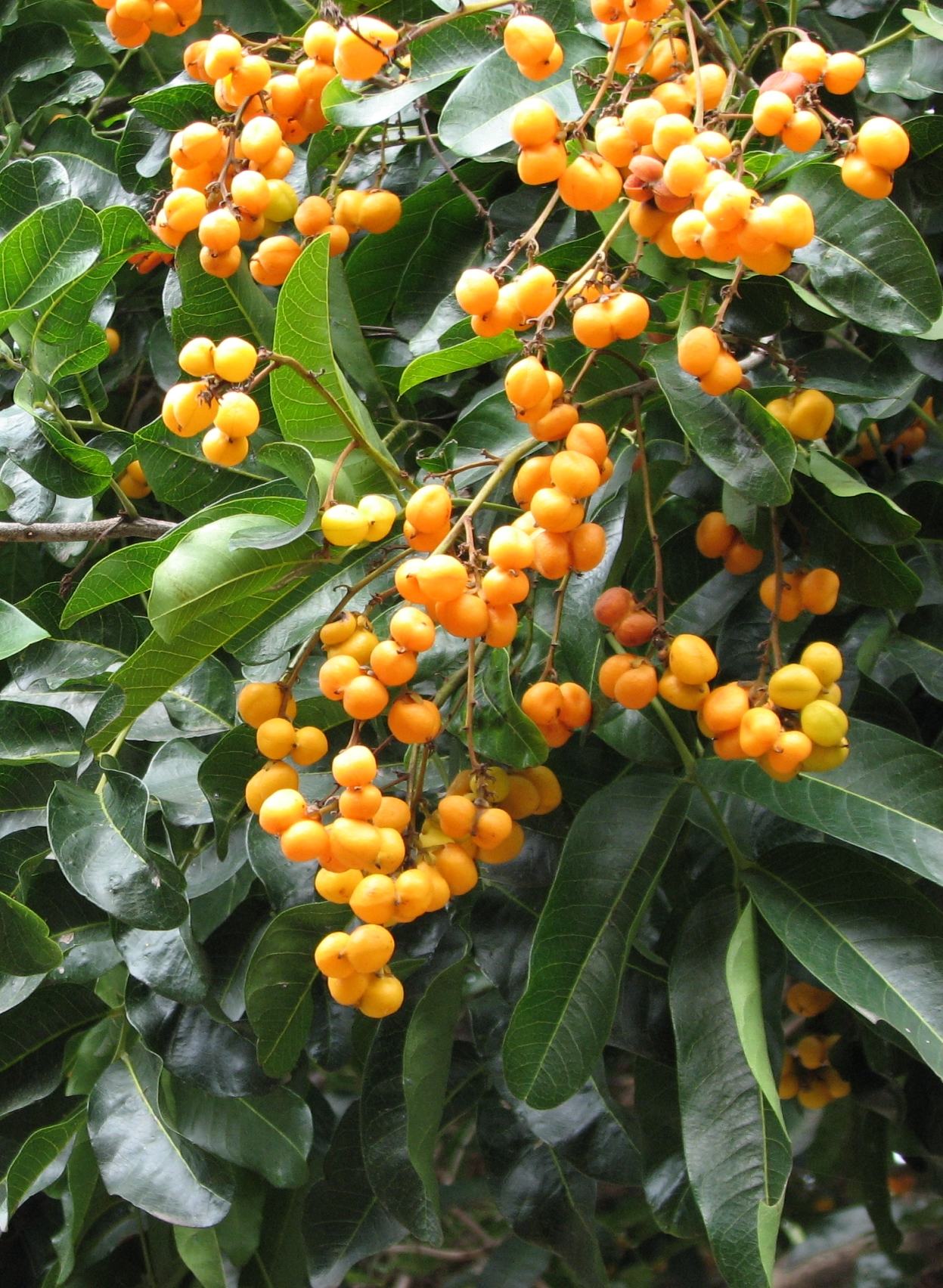
- Leaves and fruits, City Botanic Gardens Brisbane

Scientific classification
- Kingdom: Plantae
- Clade: Tracheophytes
- Clade: Angiosperms
- Clade: Eudicots
- Clade: Rosids
- Order: Sapindales
- Family: Sapindaceae
- Genus: Harpullia
- Species: H. hillii

Binomial name
- Harpullia hillii F.Muell.
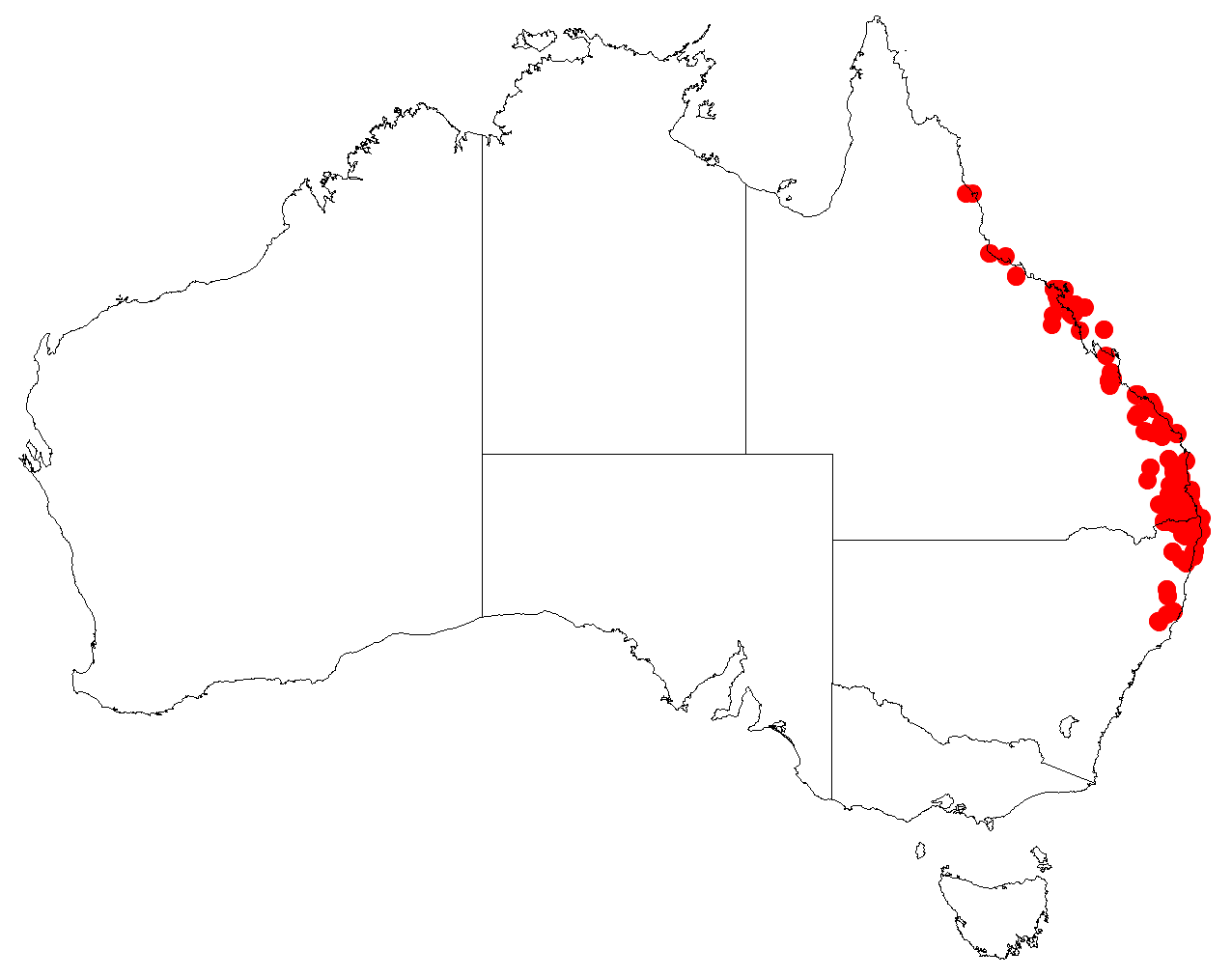
- Occurrence data from AVH

= Harpullia hillii =

Species of flowering plant

Harpullia hillii, commonly known as tulipwood, blunt-leaved tulip or oblong-leaved tulip, is a species of flowering plant in the family Sapindaceae, and is endemic to eastern Australia. It is a tree with paripinnate leaves, the leaflets elliptic to egg-shaped and papery with the narrower end towards the base, white flowers, and orange capsules containing a seed nearly enclosed in a red aril.

== Description ==
Harpullia hillii is a tree that typically grows to a height of 7 m (23 ft), sometimes to 20 m (66 ft), its new growth with dark brown, woolly hairs. Its leaves are paripinnate, 100–300 mm (3.9–11.8 in) long with 2 to 10 elliptic to egg-shaped, papery leaflets with the narrower end towards the base, mostly 55–160 mm (2.2–6.3 in) long and 25–55 mm (0.98–2.17 in) wide on a winged petiole 35–80 mm (1.4–3.1 in) long. The flowers are borne in panicles in leaf axils or on the ends of branches and are 140–300 mm (5.5–11.8 in) long. The sepals are 6–8 mm (0.24–0.31 in) long and covered with velvety hairs, the petals are white and 8–12 mm (0.31–0.47 in) long, there are 5 stamens, and the ovary is covered with velvety hairs. The fruit is a yellow, elliptic or oval capsule 13–15 mm (0.51–0.59 in) long, with a single seed in each locule and enclosed in a red aril.

== Taxonomy ==
Harpullia hillii was first described in 1859 by Ferdinand von Mueller in Transaction of the Philosophical Institute of Victoria. The specific epithet (hillii) honours Wlter Hill, who was the first collector of this species in Queensland.

== Distribution and habitat ==
Tulipwood usually occurs in dry rainforest on hillsides between Cairns in Queensland to near Taree in New South Wales.

== Use in horticulture ==
This species is cultivated for its dense foliage and ornamental, but inedible, berries. It prefers a partially shaded situation, protected from frost. Plants may be propagated from fresh seeds pre-soaked in water.

== Ecology ==
The larvae of the common pencilled-blue butterfly (Candalides absimilis) feed on this species.
