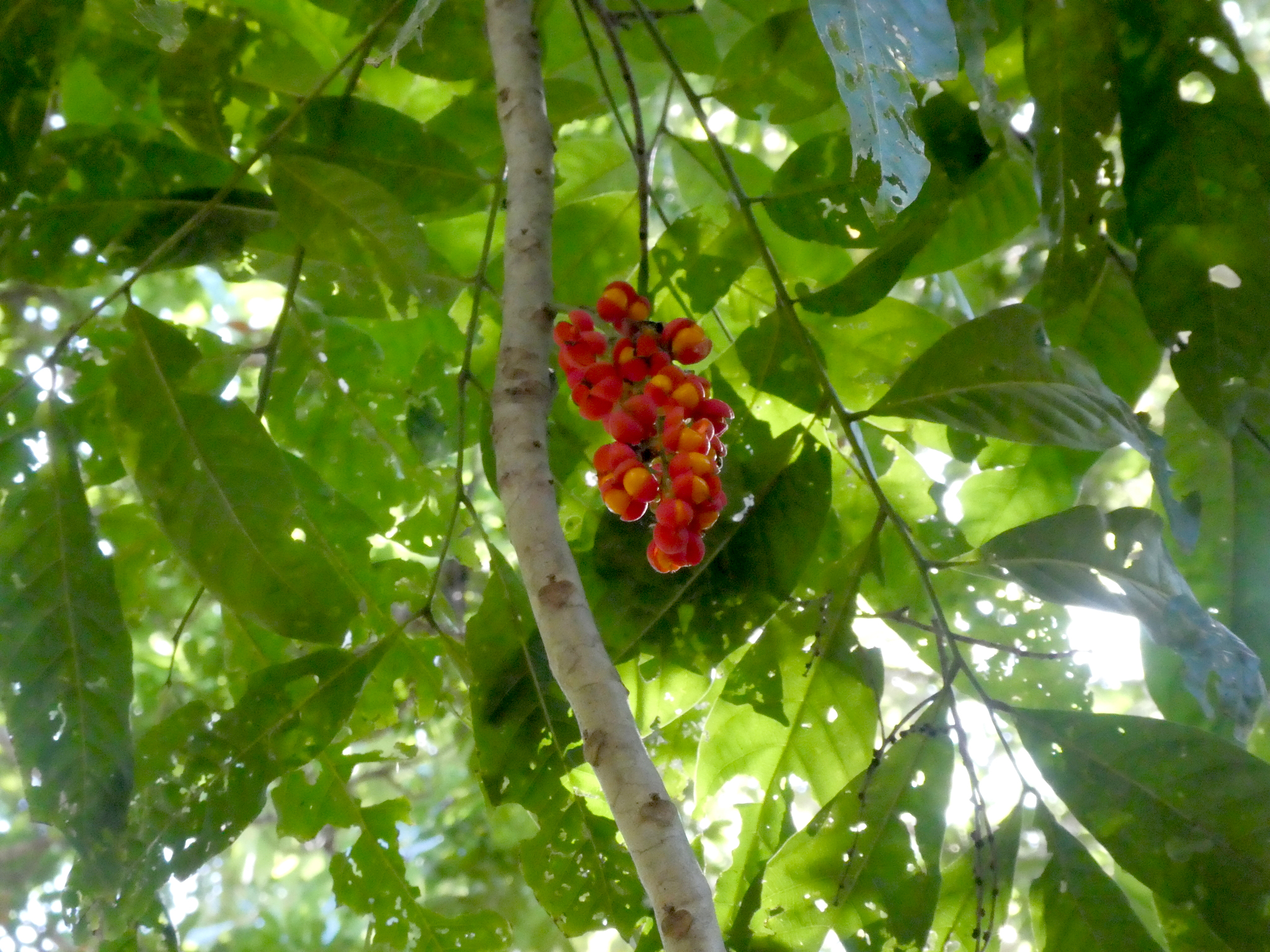
- Fruits

Conservation status
- Least Concern (IUCN 3.1)
- Least Concern (NCA)

Scientific classification
- Kingdom: Plantae
- Clade: Tracheophytes
- Clade: Angiosperms
- Clade: Eudicots
- Clade: Rosids
- Order: Sapindales
- Family: Sapindaceae
- Genus: Harpullia
- Species: H. ramiflora

Binomial name
- Harpullia ramiflora Radlk.
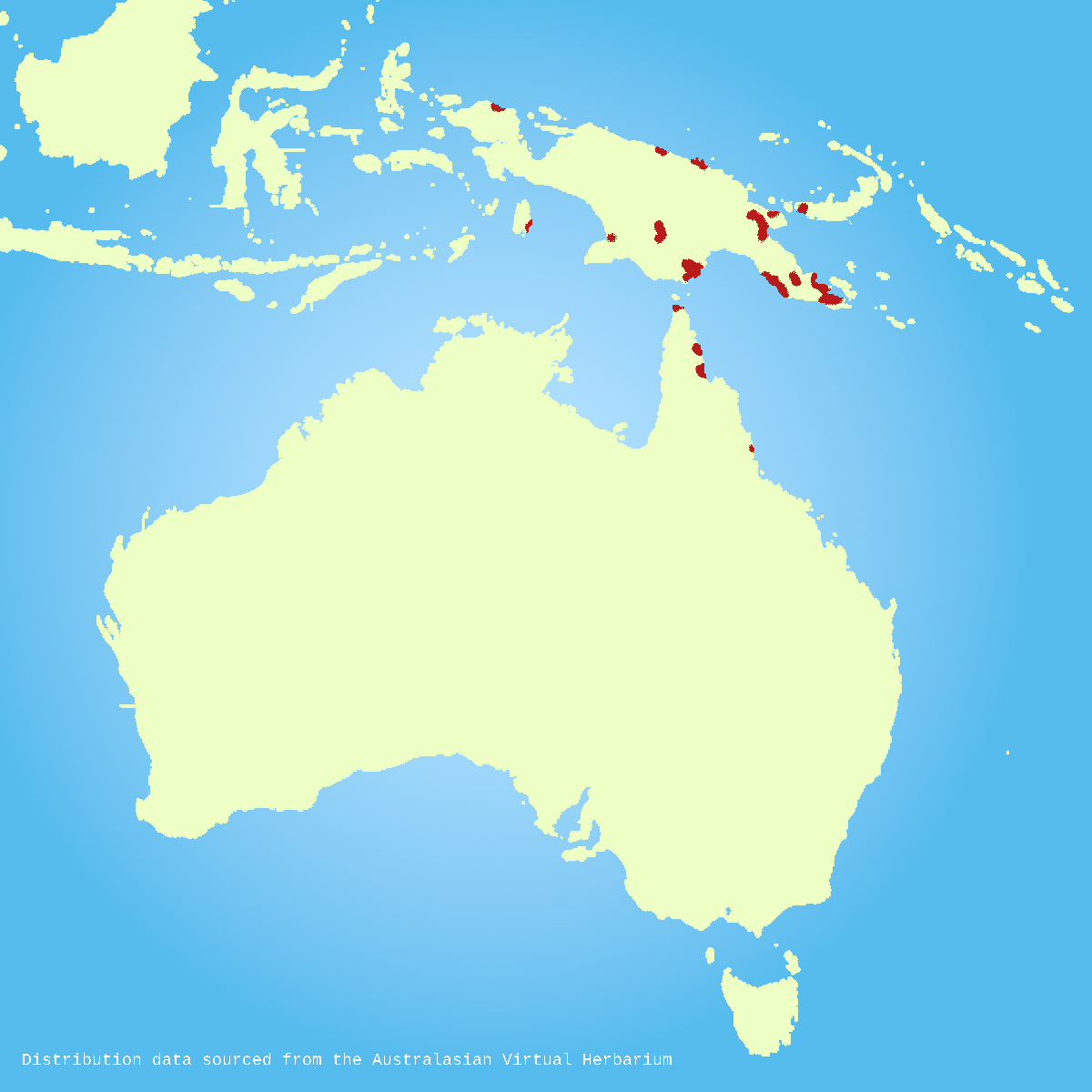

Synonyms
- Harpullia aeruginosa Radlk.; Harpullia angustifolia Radlk.; Harpullia reticulata Radlk.; Harpullia weinlandii K.Schum.

= Harpullia ramiflora =

Claudie tulipwood

Species of flowering plant

Harpullia ramiflora, commonly known as the Claudie tulipwood or Cape York tulipwood, is a species of plant in the lychee family Sapindaceae, native to parts of Malesia, New Guinea, and northeast Queensland, Australia. It was first described in 1877, and is now cultivated as a street and garden plant in Australia. It has a conservation status of 'least concern'.

== Description ==
The Claudie tulipwood is a small tree growing up to 9 m (30 ft) high and a DBH of 15 cm (6 in). The dark green, glossy, compound leaves have 8 to 12 leaflets, and are quite large (they can reach up to 100 cm (39 in) long including the petiole). The ovate to elliptic leaflets are also fairly large, reaching up to 40 by 8.5 cm (16 by 3 in).

The inflorescences are initially axillary, later as the leaves fall they become ramiflorous. They are panicles up to 20 cm (8 in) long, and carry numerous flowers about 10–13 mm (0.4–0.5 in) in diameter, with a green caylyx and 4 or 5 white or cream reflexed petals.

The bright red fruits are two-valved capsules about 12–18 mm (0.5–0.7 in) long by 18 mm (0.7 in) wide. Each valve contains a single black seed which is almost or completely covered by a bright yellow aril.

=== Phenology ===
In Australia, flowering occurs from October to July, and fruits ripen from April to November.

== Taxonomy ==
This species was first described in 1877 by the German botanist Ludwig Adolph Timotheus Radlkofer. His paper, titled Über die Sapindaceen Holländisch-Indiens, was published in 1879 in the work Actes du congrès international de botanistes, d'horticulteurs, de négociants et de fabricants de produits du règne végétal tenu à Amsterdam en 1877.

== Distribution and habitat ==
Harpullia ramiflora is native to the island of Catanduanes in the Philippines, the island of Halmahera and the Aru Islands in the Maluku Islands, New Guinea, and Cape York Peninsula in Australia. It grows in rainforest and gallery forest.

In Australia the range of this species was originally from the top of Cape York to near Rossville, but after extensive planting throughout the city of Cairns it has become naturalised in the areas around the city.

== Conservation ==
As of August 2025, this species has been assessed to be of least concern by the International Union for Conservation of Nature (IUCN) and by the Queensland Government under its Nature Conservation Act. The justification provide by the IUCN for its assessment is that the plant is found in a range of habitats across a large area of almost 11,000,000 km^{2} (4,200,000 sq mi) — including some protected areas — and that no specific threats have been identified for the plant.

== Cultivation ==
This tree has been widely planted in the suburbs of Cairns, Queensland, particularly in the streets of Smithfield and Trinity Park. It prefers full sun to semi-shade and can tolerate waterlogged soils. It can be propagated from seed.

== Gallery ==
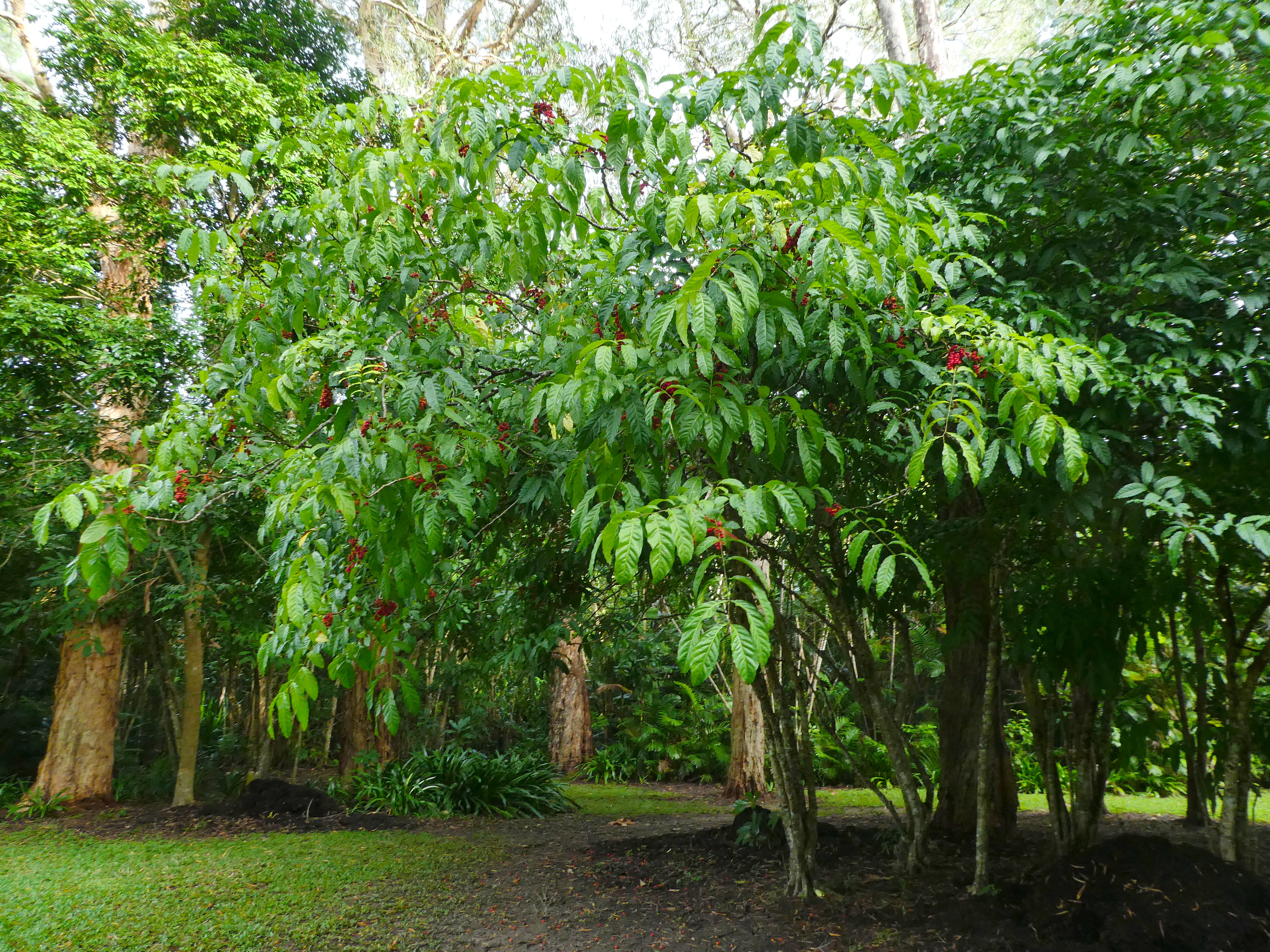
Habit

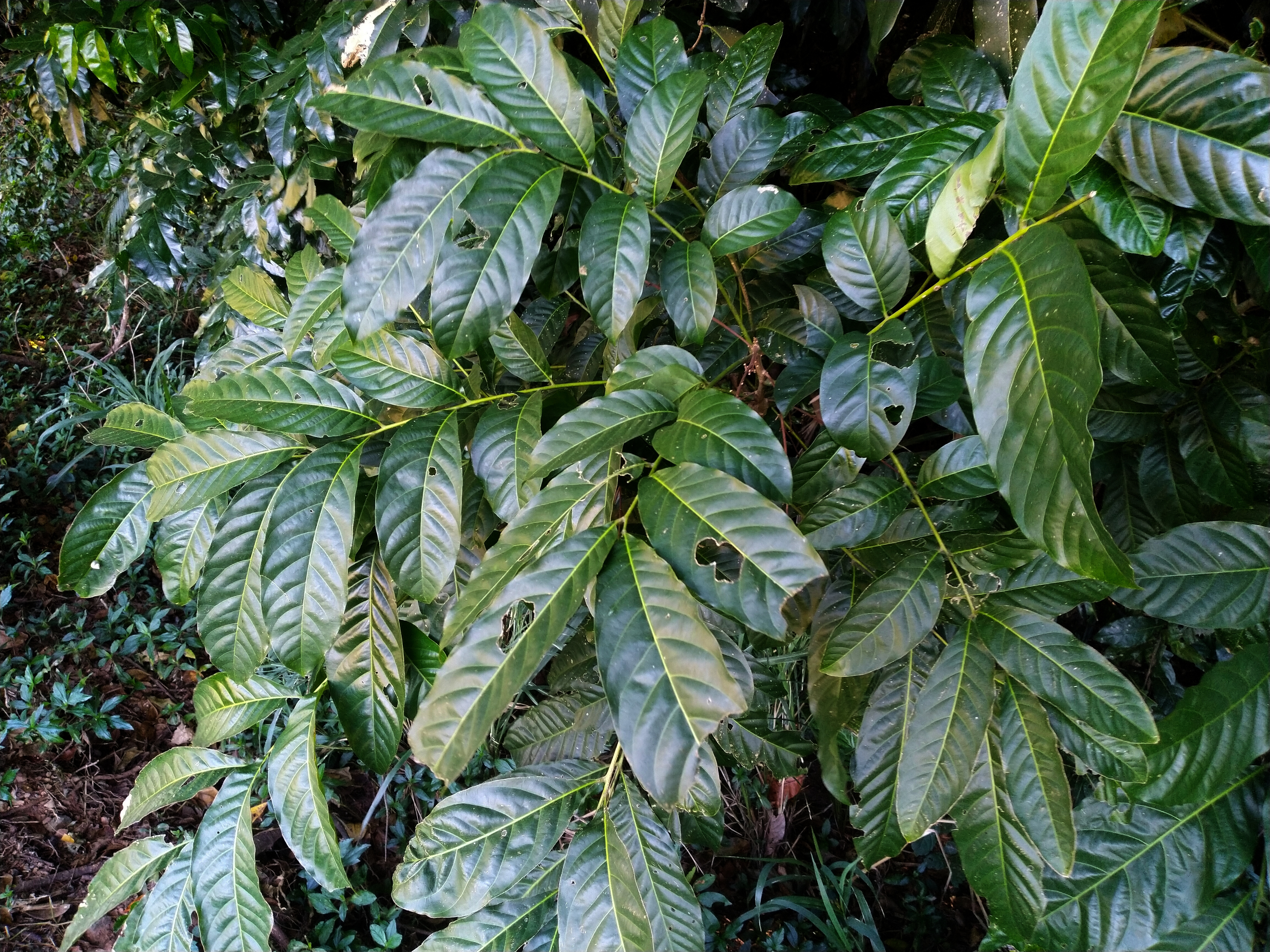
Foliage

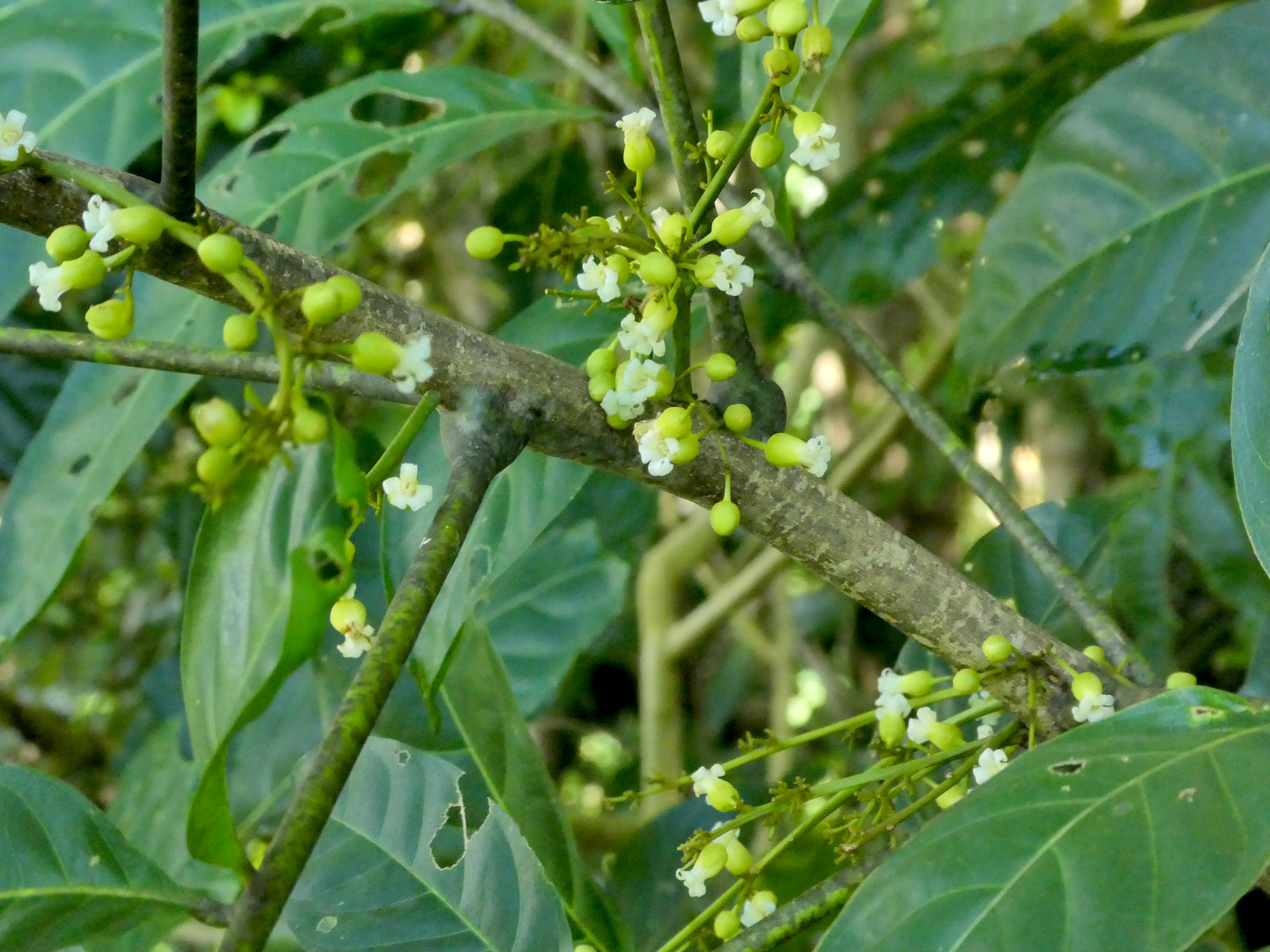
Flowers

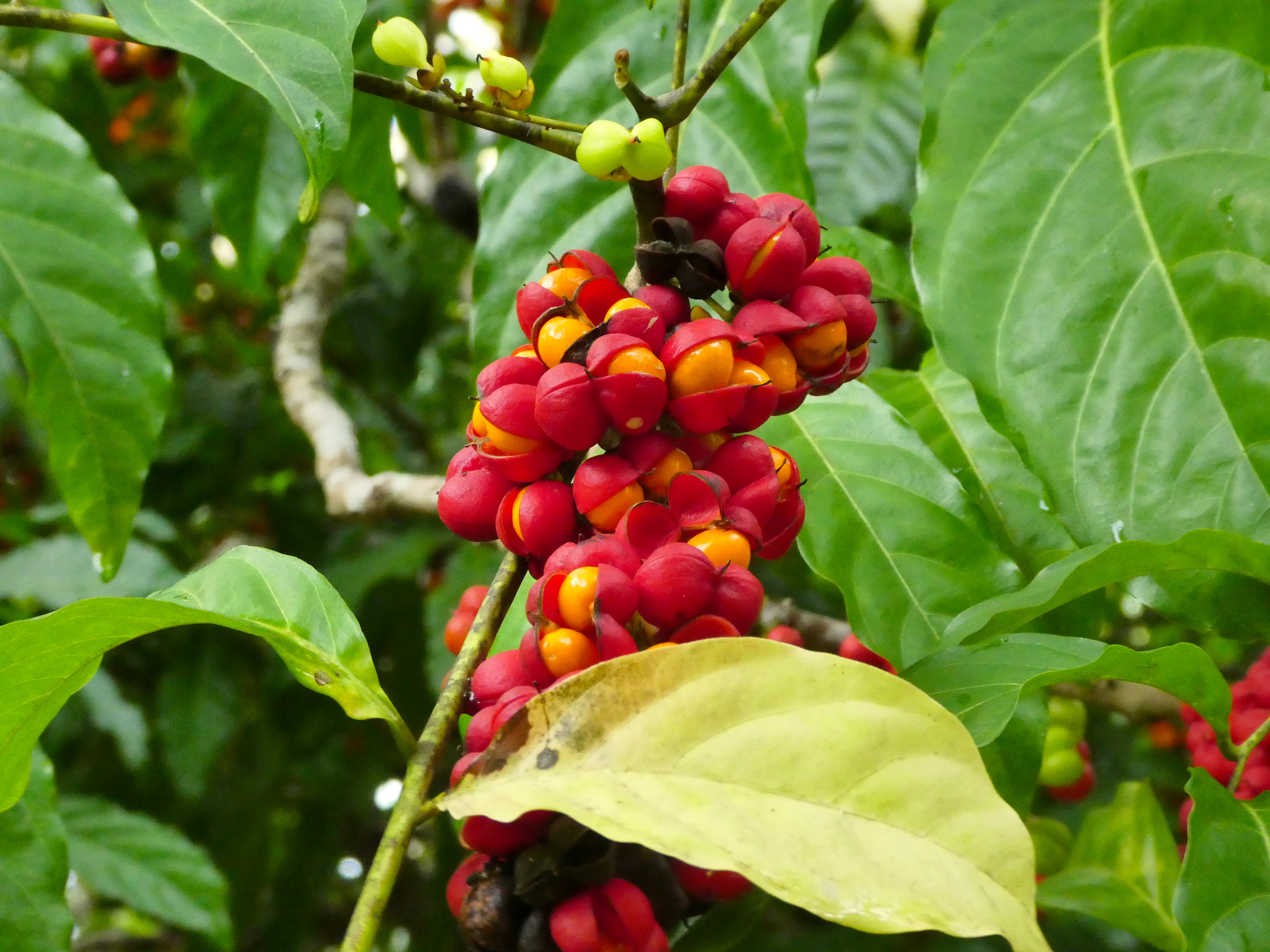
Mature fruit

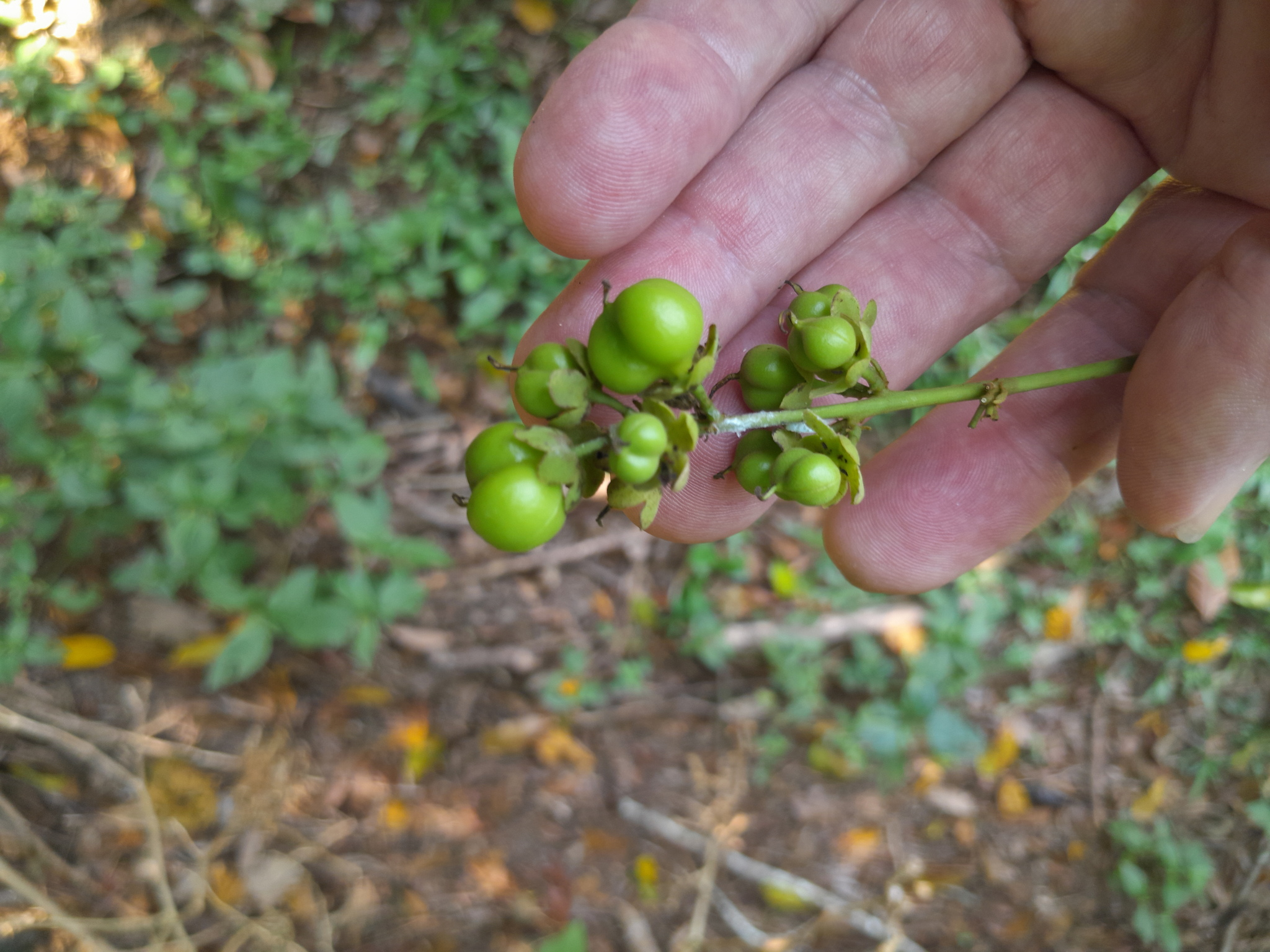
Unripe fruit
