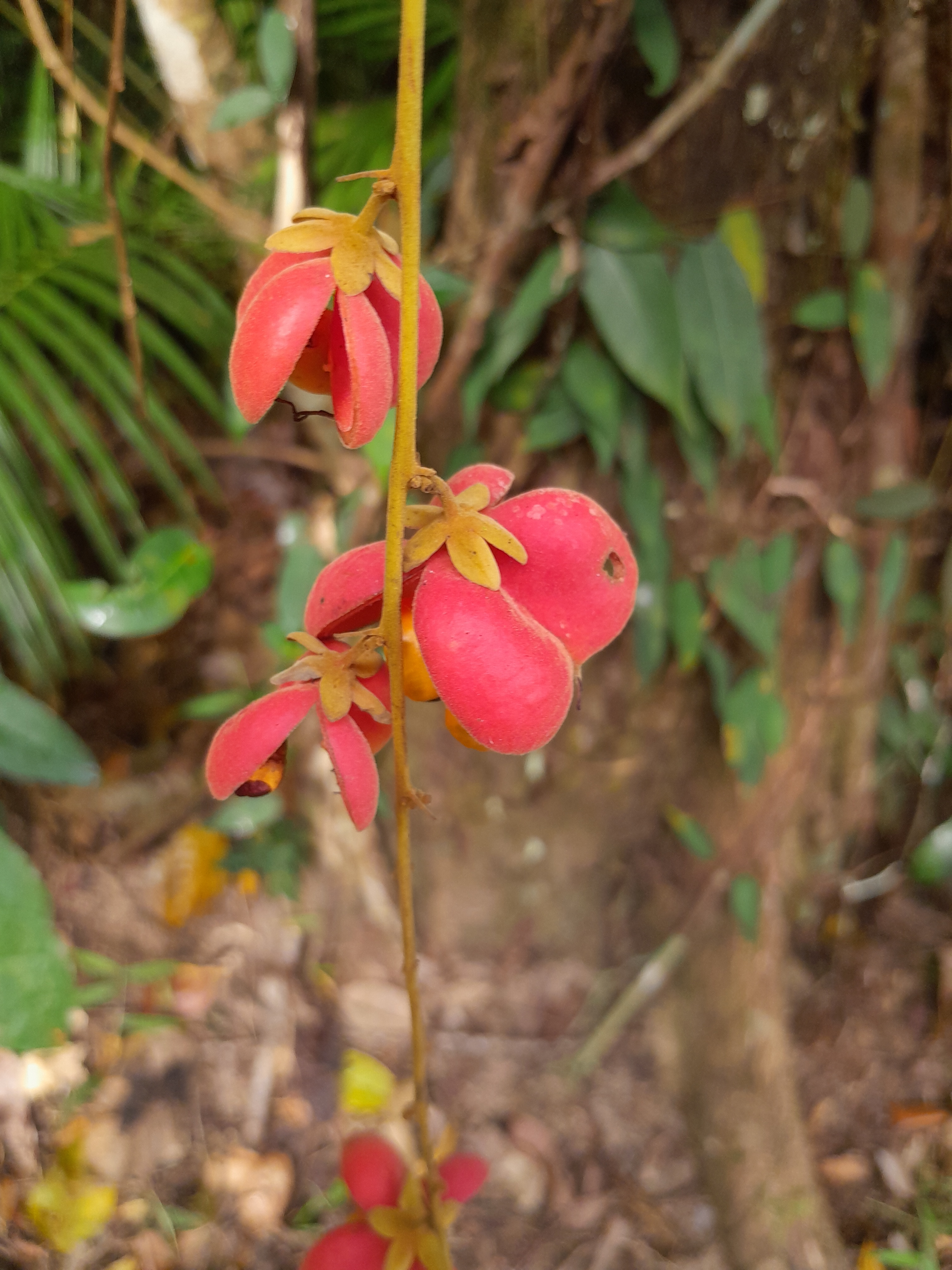
- Fruiting at Crystal Cascades near Cairns, September 2023

Conservation status
- Least Concern (NCA)
- Least Concern (IUCN 3.1)

Scientific classification
- Kingdom: Plantae
- Clade: Tracheophytes
- Clade: Angiosperms
- Clade: Eudicots
- Clade: Rosids
- Order: Sapindales
- Family: Sapindaceae
- Genus: Harpullia
- Species: H. rhyticarpa

Binomial name
- Harpullia rhyticarpa C.T. White & W.D.Francis
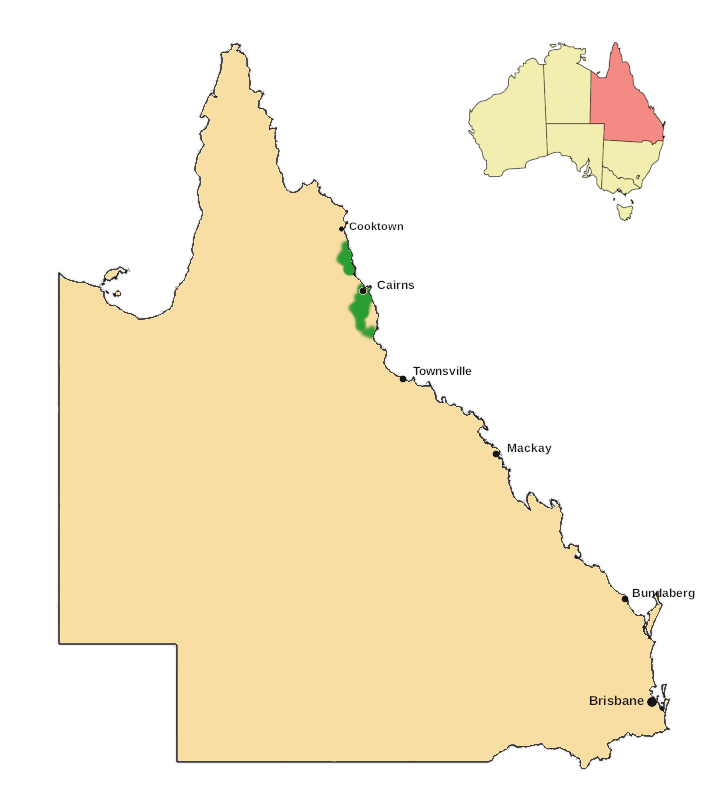

Synonyms
- Harpullia angustialata C.T.White & W.D.Francis

= Harpullia rhyticarpa =

Slender Harpullia

Species of flowering plant

Harpullia rhyticarpa, commonly known as slender harpullia, is a plant in the family Sapindaceae which is endemic to the rainforests northeastern Queensland, Australia.

== Description ==
The slender harpullia is an evergreen, spindly, understory tree growing to 4 m (13 ft) high, and sometimes to 6 m (20 ft). The foliage is glossy dark green and consists of compound leaves with 8–10 leaflets. The petiole and rachis may or may not be winged, and the petiole is swollen where it attaches to the twig. The leaflets measure up to 17 cm (6.7 in) long by 5.5 cm (2.2 in) wide, and are attached to the rachis by a very short petiolule (leaflet stem).

The inflorescences are produced in the leaf axils and are pendulous, measuring up to 70 cm (28 in) long. The flowers are strongly perfumed, the sepals about 10 mm (0.39 in) long, brown/green in colour and densely hairy, the petals about 14 mm (0.55 in) long, white and glabrous.

The fruit is a velvety, yellow to reddish, bilocular capsule roughly 2 cm (0.79 in) long. Each locule usually contains two black seeds, each almost entirely covered by a yellow or red aril.

== Taxonomy ==
This species was first described in 1920 by the botanists Cyril Tenison White and William Douglas Francis, based on material collected by Frederick Manson Bailey from the Bellenden Ker Range. Their work, titled Contributions to the Queensland Flora, was published in the Botany Bulletin by the Department of Agriculture, Queensland.

== Distribution and habitat ==
Harpullia rhyticarpa is confined to coastal rainforests of northeastern Queensland, from near Cooktown to Cardwell, including the Atherton Tableland where it is common. It grows in well-developed rainforest at altitudes from close to sea level up to around 1,200 m (3,900 ft).

== Conservation ==
This species is listed by both the Queensland Department of Environment and Science and the International Union for Conservation of Nature (IUCN) as least concern.

== Cultivation ==
It has been suggested that this plant be used in tropical gardens, although it requires specific conditions. As of 21 September 2023 there is little evidence of the species having been taken up by landscapers, and in the city of Cairns (which is in the centre of the species' natural range) there are only two specimens listed on Council's treeplotter database, both of which are associated with the Cairns Botanic Gardens.

== Gallery ==
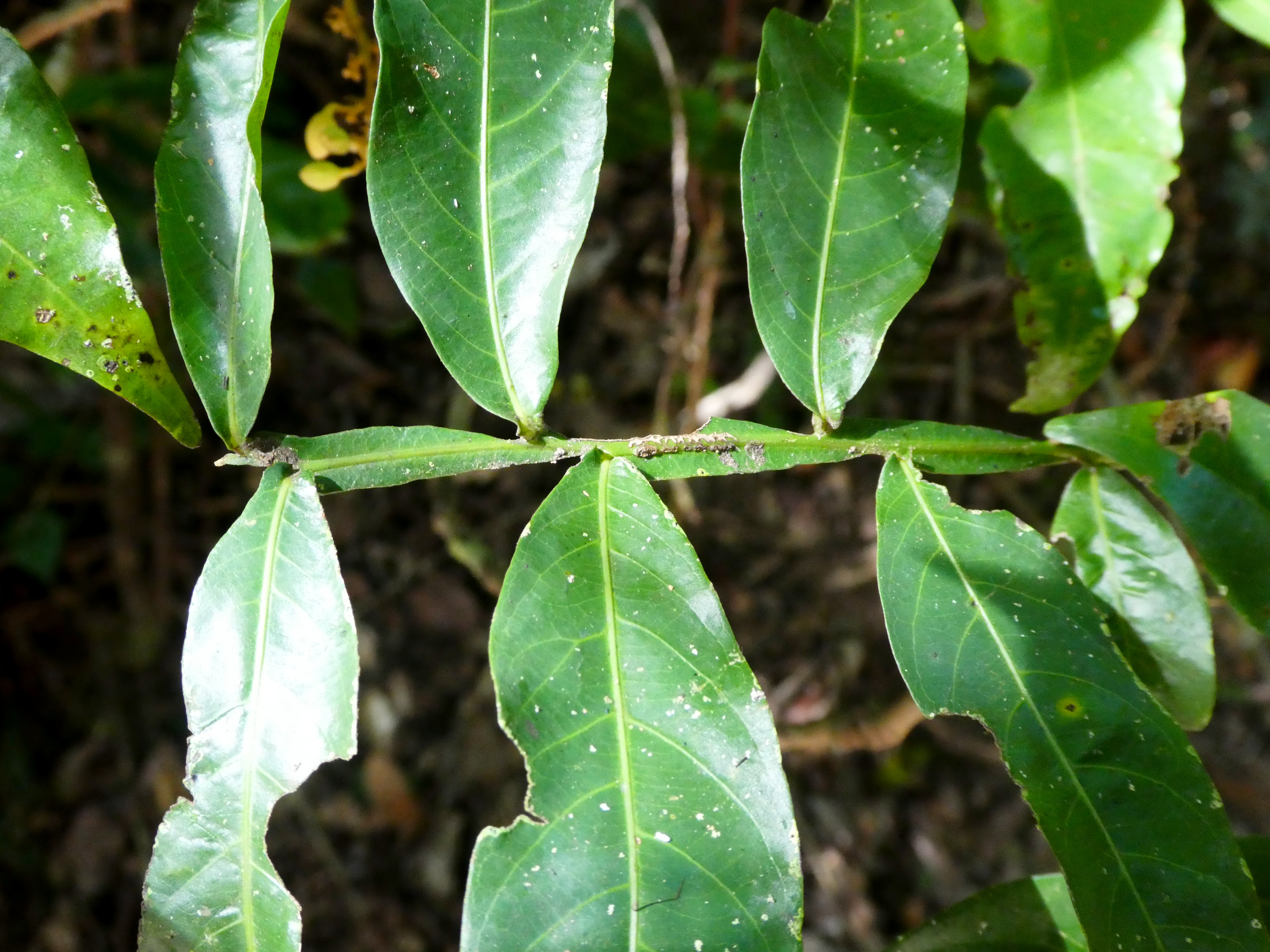
Leaf, showing winged rachis

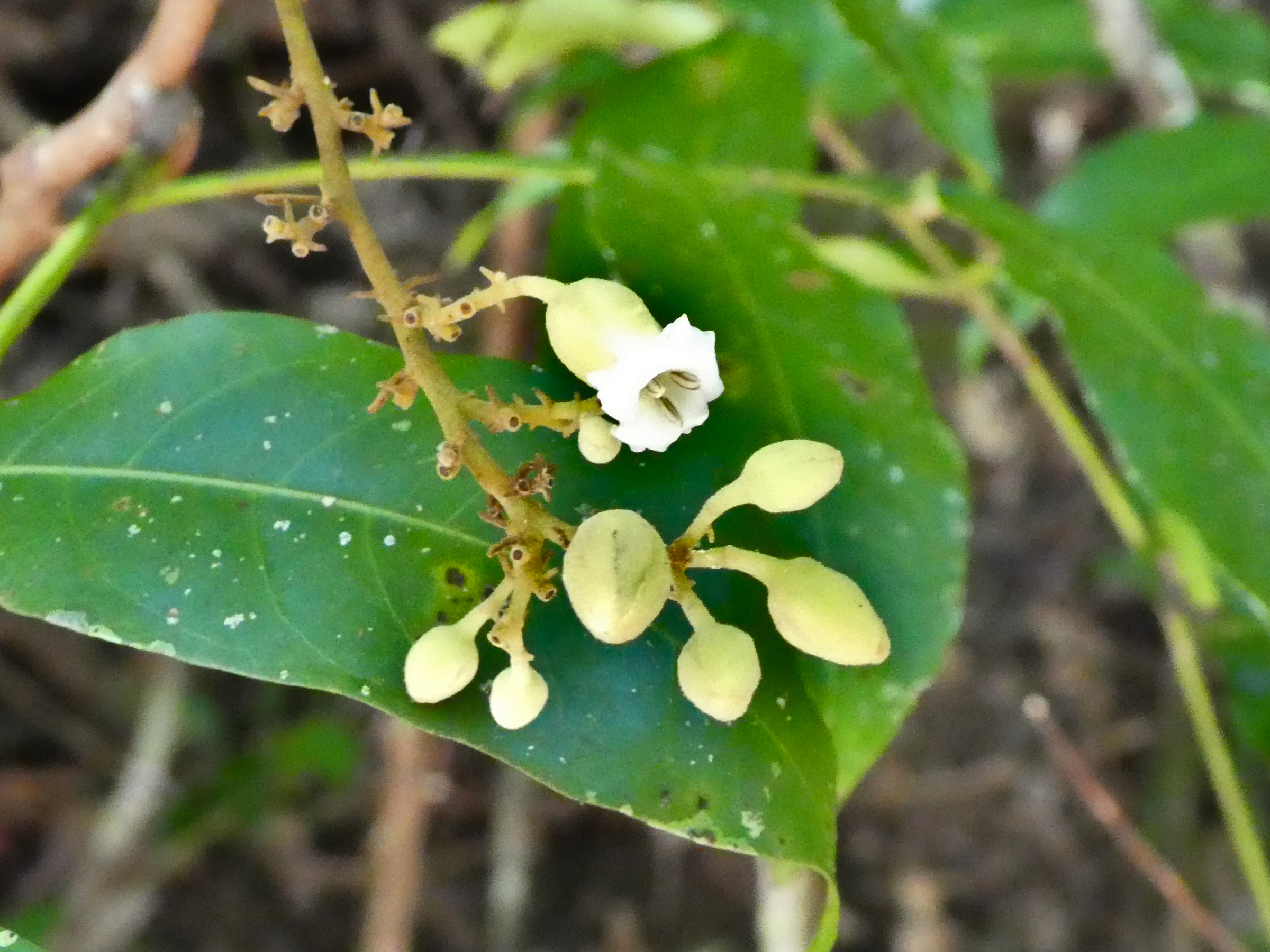
Flower and flower buds

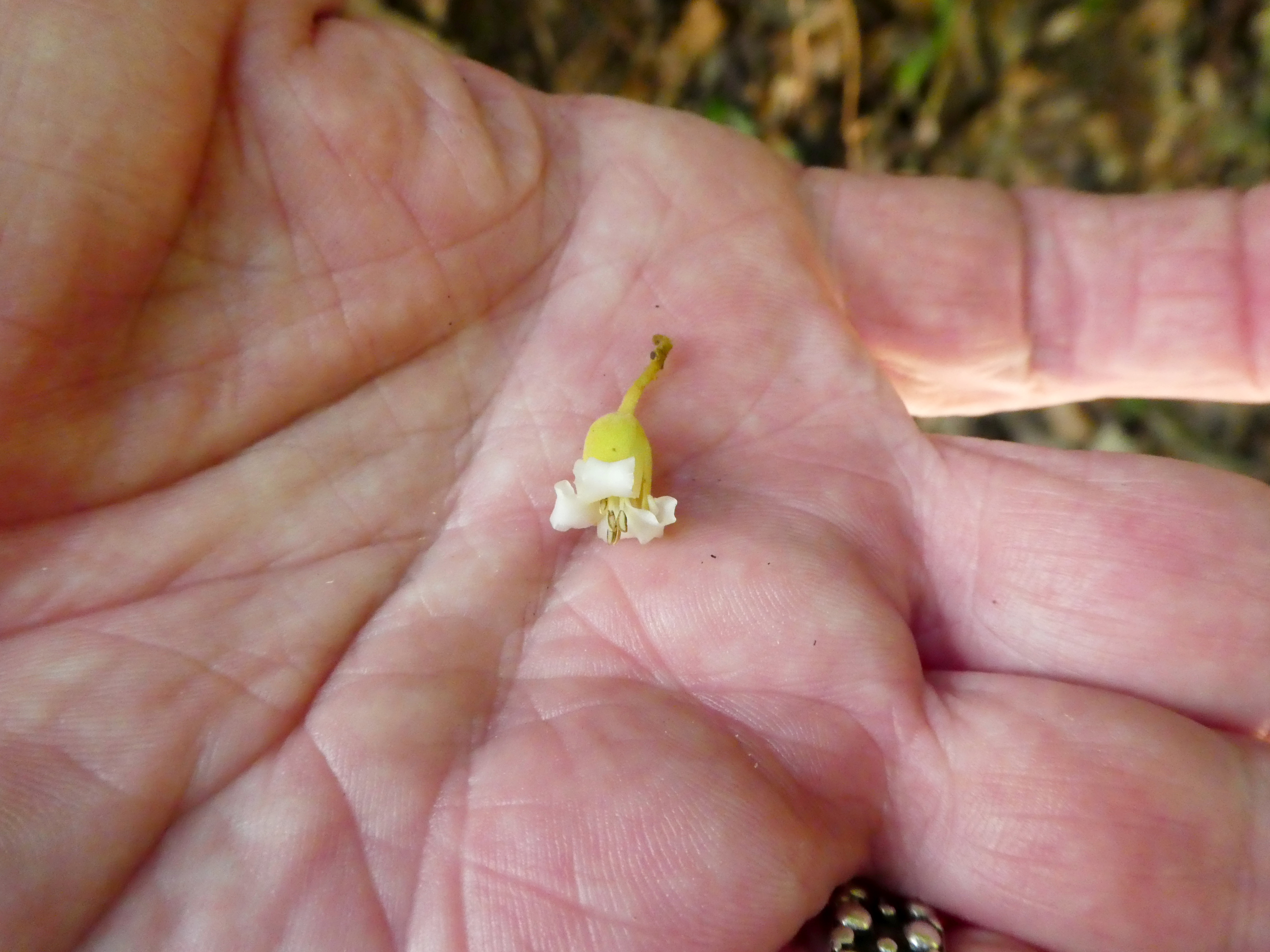
Single flower

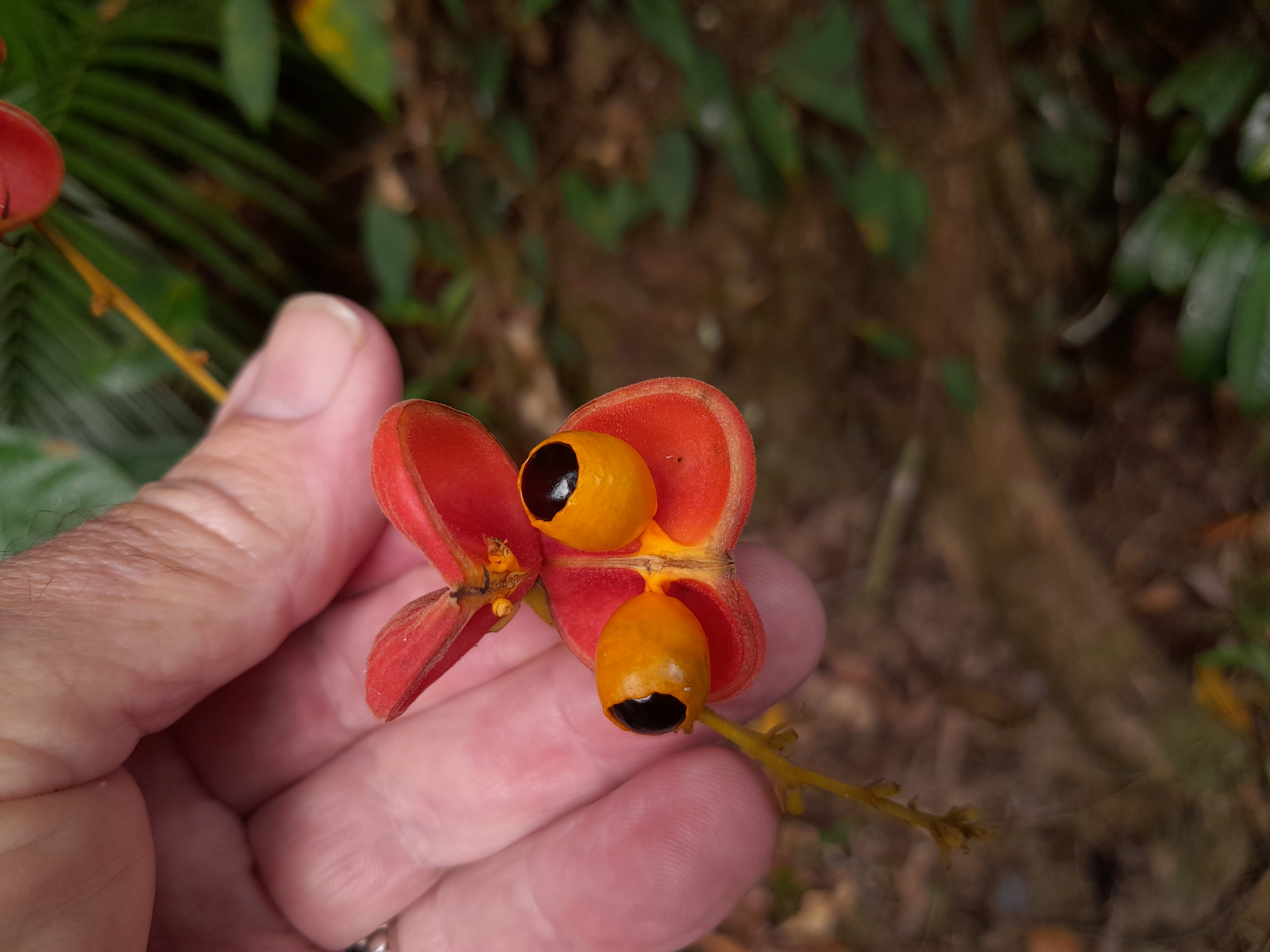
Dehisced fruit
