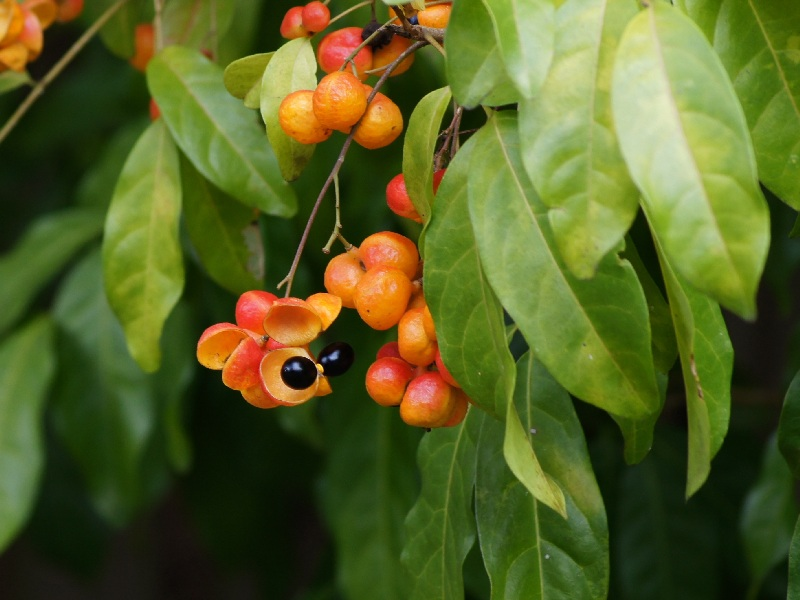
- Fruit and leaves

Scientific classification
- Kingdom: Plantae
- Clade: Tracheophytes
- Clade: Angiosperms
- Clade: Eudicots
- Clade: Rosids
- Order: Sapindales
- Family: Sapindaceae
- Genus: Harpullia
- Species: H. pendula

Binomial name
- Harpullia pendula Planch. ex F.Muell.
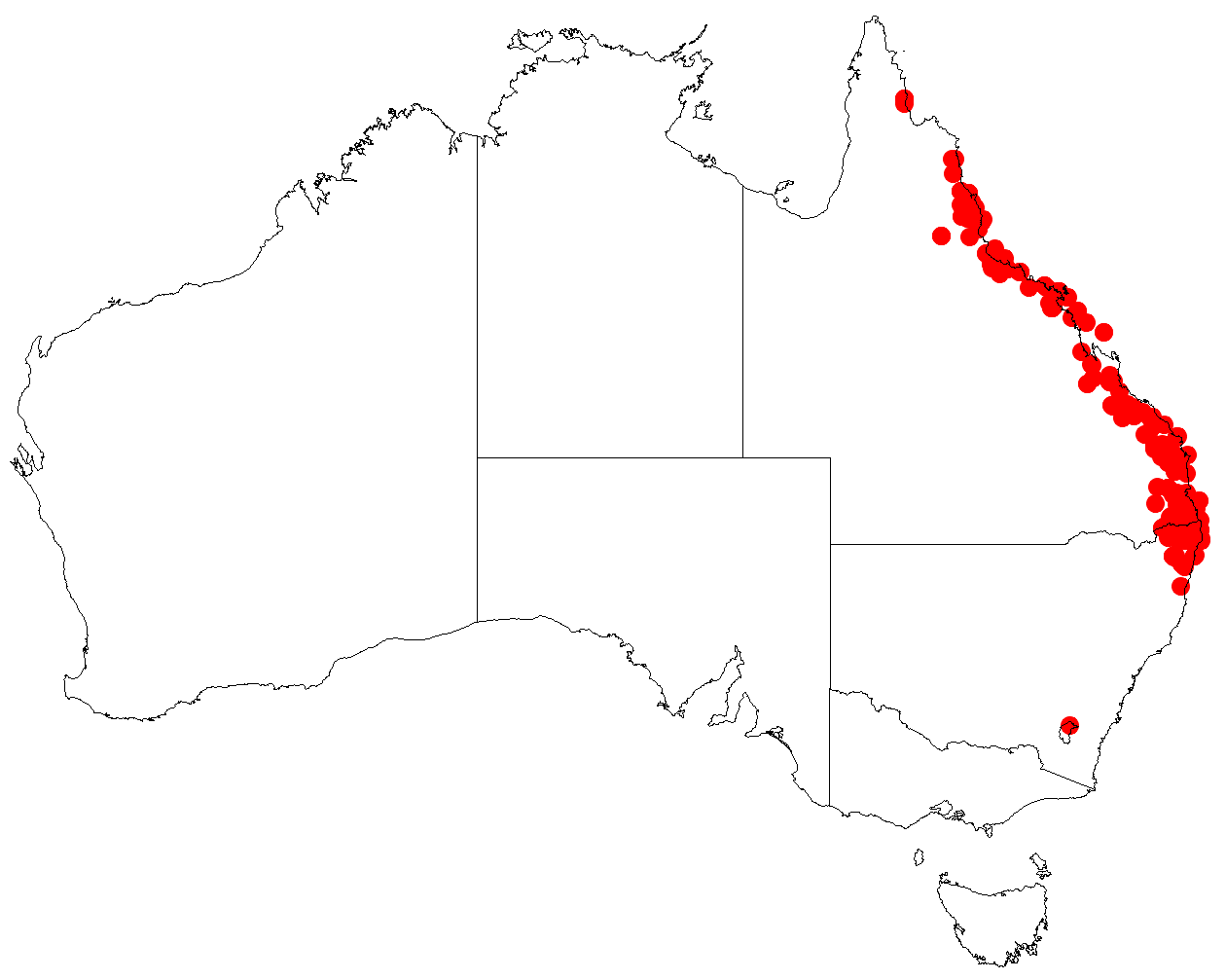
- Occurrence data from AVH

= Harpullia pendula =

Tulipwood

Species of tree

Habit in a Brisbane street

Harpullia pendula, commonly known as tulipwood, mogun-mogun, tulip lancewood, Queensland tulipwood, black tulipwood or black tulip, is a species of flowering plant in the family Sapindaceae, and is endemic to eastern Australia. It is a tree with paripinnate leaves, the leaflets elliptic to egg-shaped with the narrower end towards the base, greenish yellow flowers, and yellow to reddish capsules.

== Description ==
Harpullia pendula is a tree that typically grows to a height of up to 15 m (49 ft) with a dbh 60 cm (24 in), its new growth with soft, fawn-coloured hairs. Its leaves are paripinnate, 100–300 mm (3.9–11.8 in) long with 4 to 8 elliptic to egg-shaped, thin, leathery leaflets with the narrower end towards the base, mostly 55–105 mm (2.2–4.1 in) long and 20–40 mm (0.79–1.57 in) wide on a petiolule 3–6 mm (0.12–0.24 in) long. The flowers are borne in panicles in leaf axils up to 280 mm (11 in) long, each flower on a pedicel 5–10 mm (0.20–0.39 in) long. The sepals are oblong to more or less round, 4–5 mm (0.16–0.20 in) long and covered with hairs. The petals are greenish yellow, 7–8 mm (0.28–0.31 in) long, and there are usually 8 stamens. The ovary is covered with woolly hairs and the style is 5–10 mm (0.20–0.39 in) long and twisted. The fruit is a yellow-orange to red capsule 13–25 mm (0.51–0.98 in) long, with a single seed in each locule.

== Taxonomy ==
Harpullia pendula was first formally described in 1859 by Ferdinand von Mueller in Transactions of the Philosophical Institute of Victoria from an unpublished description by Jules Émile Planchon, of plants in the forests of Moreton Bay. The specific epithet (pendula) means 'hanging' or 'drooping', referring to the fruit bunches.

== Distribution and habitat ==
Tulipwood grows in dry rainforest on basalt between Coen in Queensland and the Bellinger River in north-eastern New South Wales, at altitudes up to 850 m (2,790 ft).

== Ecology ==
The larval stages of Deudorix epijarbas feed on this species of tree.

== Uses ==
=== Timber ===
The timber of H. pendula is well regarded. Excellent for turnery and cabinet timber. Fine grained, tough, heavy and durable.

=== Use in horticulture ===
Harpullia pendula is a popular ornamental tree. Seeds germinate easily from two weeks to two months.
