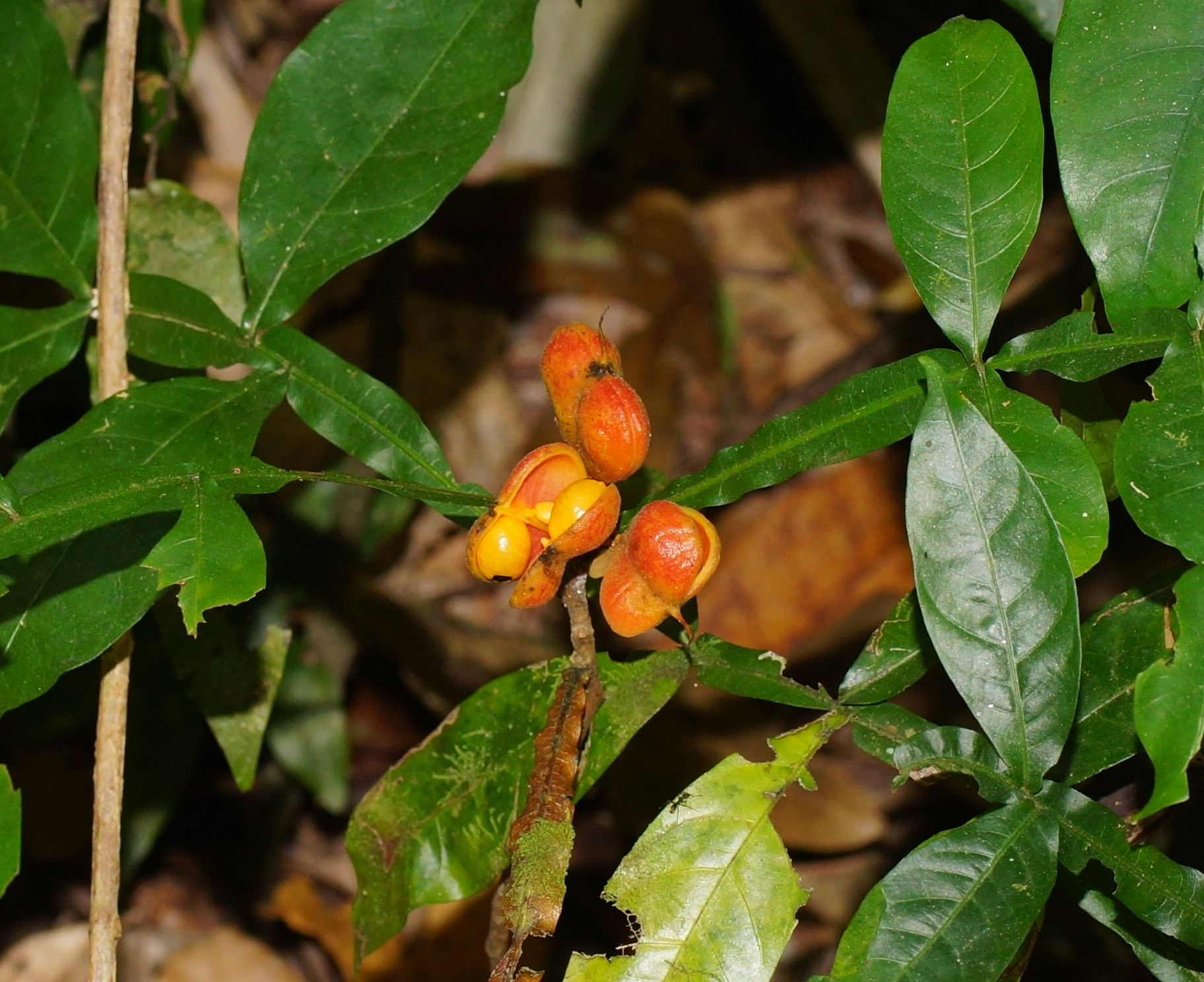
- Fruit in Tully Gorge National Park

Scientific classification
- Kingdom: Plantae
- Clade: Tracheophytes
- Clade: Angiosperms
- Clade: Eudicots
- Clade: Rosids
- Order: Sapindales
- Family: Sapindaceae
- Genus: Harpullia
- Species: H. frutescens

Binomial name
- Harpullia frutescens F.M.Bailey
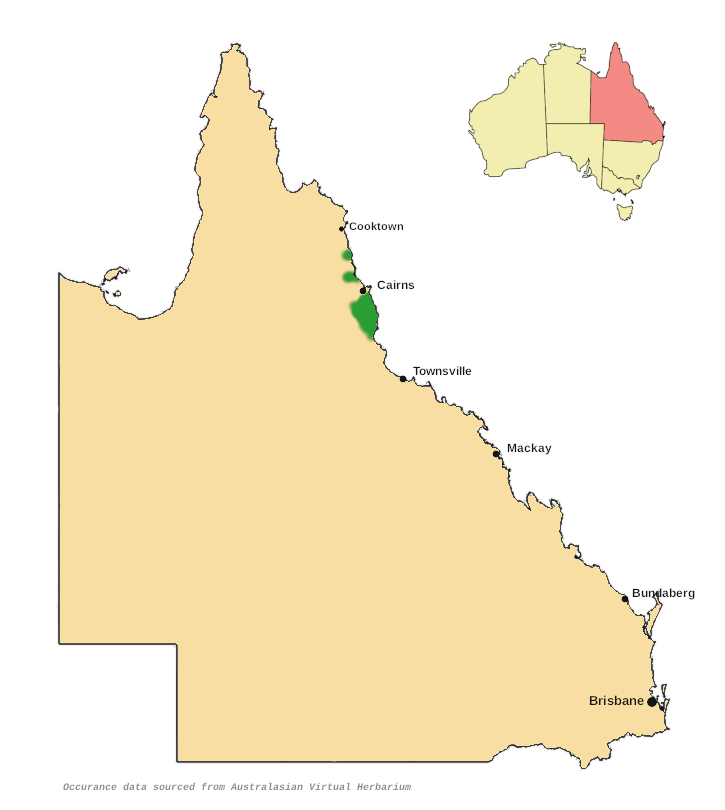

Synonyms
- List: Harpullia frutescens F.M.Bailey isonym; Harpullia holoptera Radlk.; Harpullia marginata Radlk. nom. inval., nom. nud.; Harpullia alata auct. non F.Muell.: Mueller, F.J.H. von (1875)

= Harpullia frutescens =

Species of flowering plant

Harpullia frutescens, commonly known as dwarf harpullia, is a species of flowering plant in the family Sapindaceae, and is endemic to northern Queensland. It is a shrub with leaves divided into six to eight leaflets, white flowers with a pink tinge, and crimson capsules containing 2 seeds.

== Description ==
Harpullia frutescens is a shrub that typically grows to a height of up to 1–2 m (3 ft 3 in – 6 ft 7 in), its young growth covered with downy hairs. Its leaves are paripinnate, 45–185 mm (1.8–7.3 in) long with 6 to 8 elliptic to lance shaped leaflets sometimes tapering to a point, 75–170 mm (3.0–6.7 in) long and 25–50 mm (0.98–1.97 in) wide on a winged petiole 35–85 mm (1.4–3.3 in) long. The flowers are strongly perfumed, borne in clusters of mostly 2 to 4 in upper leaf axils 30–120 mm (1.2–4.7 in) long, each flower on a slender, hairy peduncle up to 5 mm (0.20 in) long. The sepals are 7–8 mm (0.28–0.31 in) long and covered with downy hairs, the petals are white with a pink tinge, and 15–20 mm (0.59–0.79 in) long. There are 5 or 6 stamens, and the ovary covered with woolly hairs. The fruit is a laterally compressed, crimson capsule about 12–16 mm (0.47–0.63 in) long containing two shiny seeds, enclosed in a yellow, cup-shaped aril.

== Taxonomy ==
Harpullia frutescens was first formally described in 1889 by Frederick Manson Bailey in a report on the Government Scientific Expedition to the Bellenden-Ker Range. The specific epithet (frutescens) means "becoming bushy".

== Distribution and habitat ==
Dwarf harpullia is common in rainforest from Ayton to the Atherton Tableland area in North Queensland, usually in hilly country.

== Gallery ==
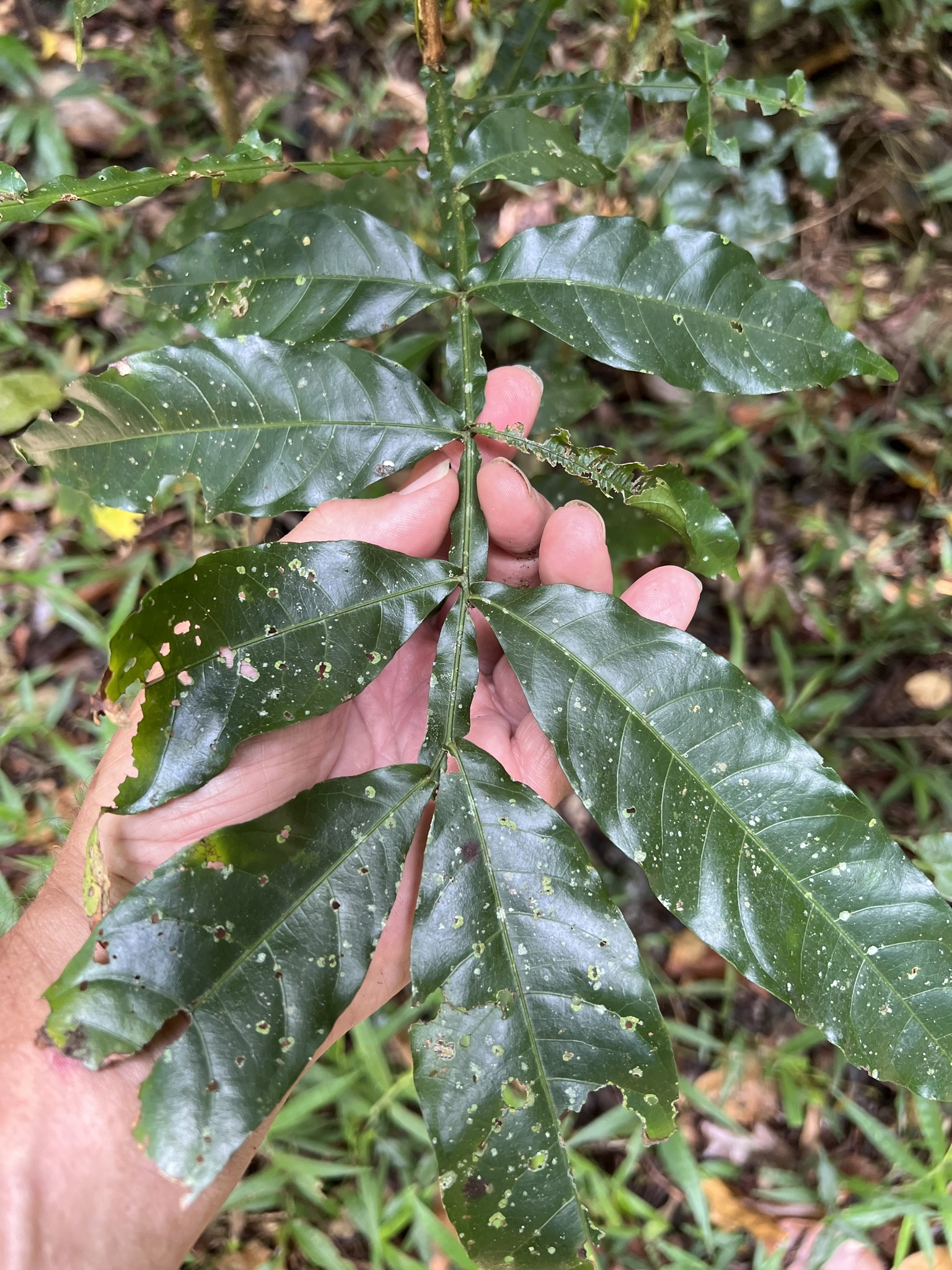
Leaf with winged rachis

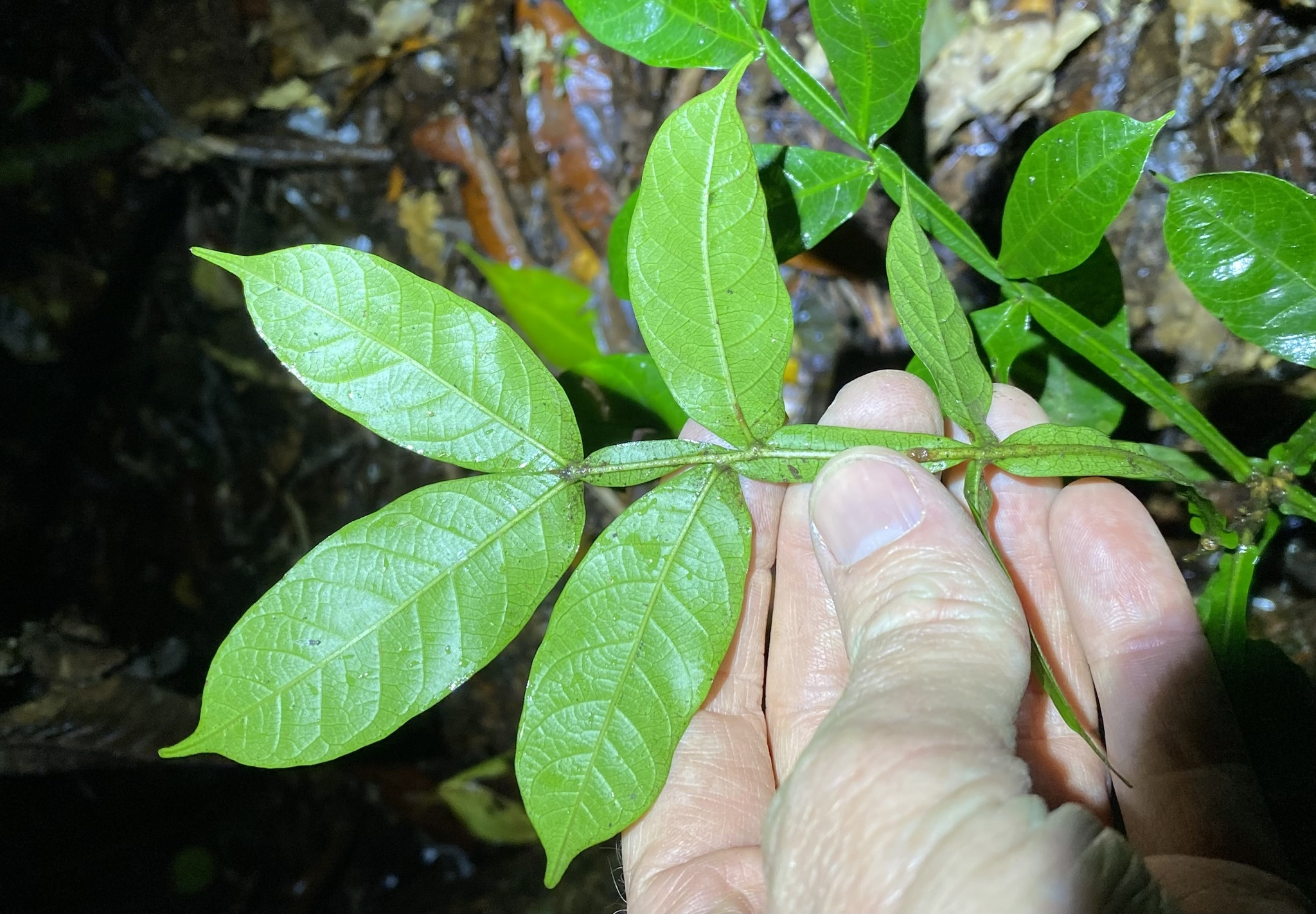
Underside of leaf

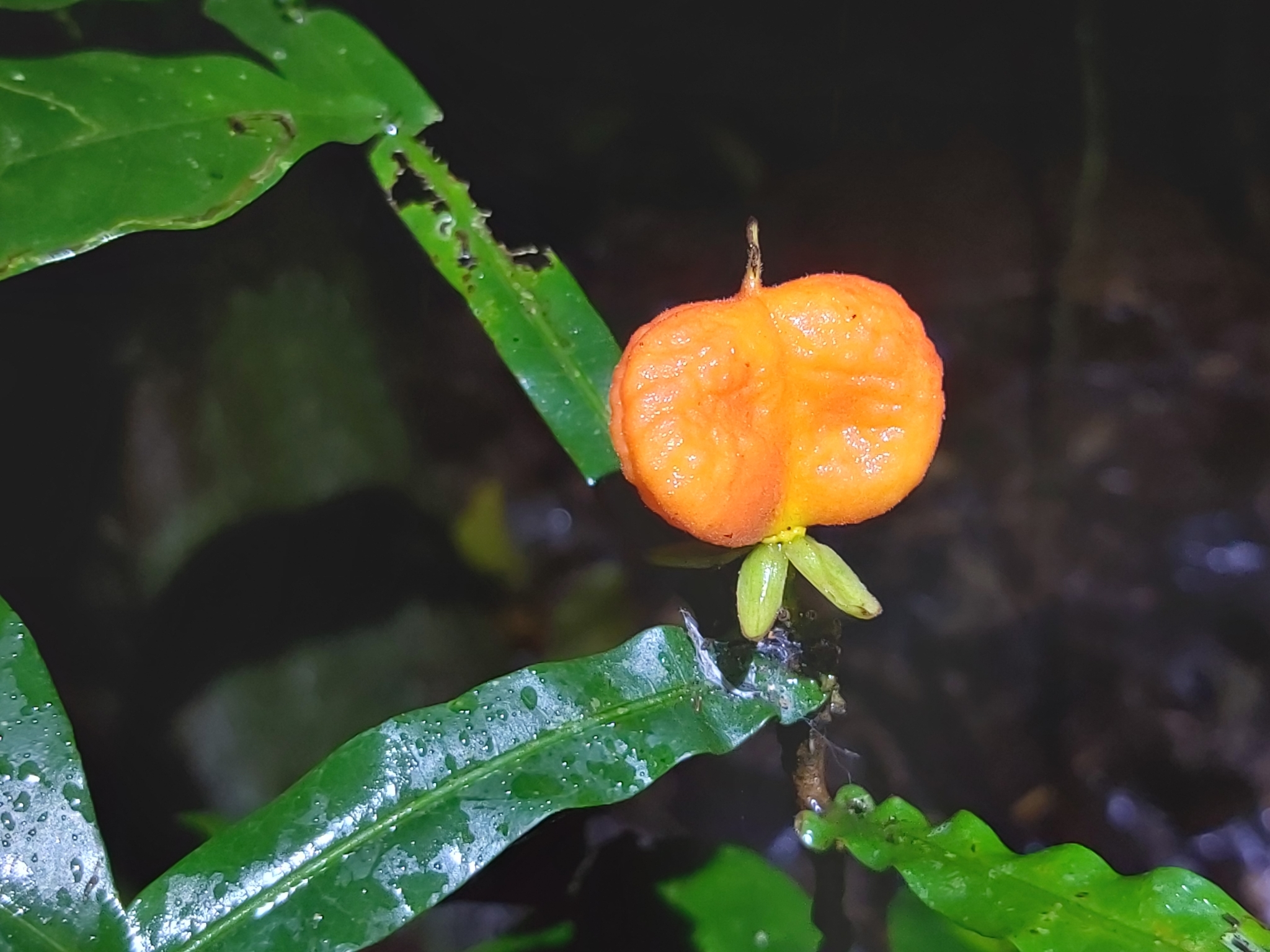
Immature fruit
