= Harpullia leichhardtii =

Scientific classification
- Kingdom: Plantae
- Clade: Tracheophytes
- Clade: Angiosperms
- Clade: Eudicots
- Clade: Rosids
- Order: Sapindales
- Family: Sapindaceae
- Genus: Harpullia
- Species: H. leichhardtii

Binomial name
- Harpullia leichhardtii Benth.
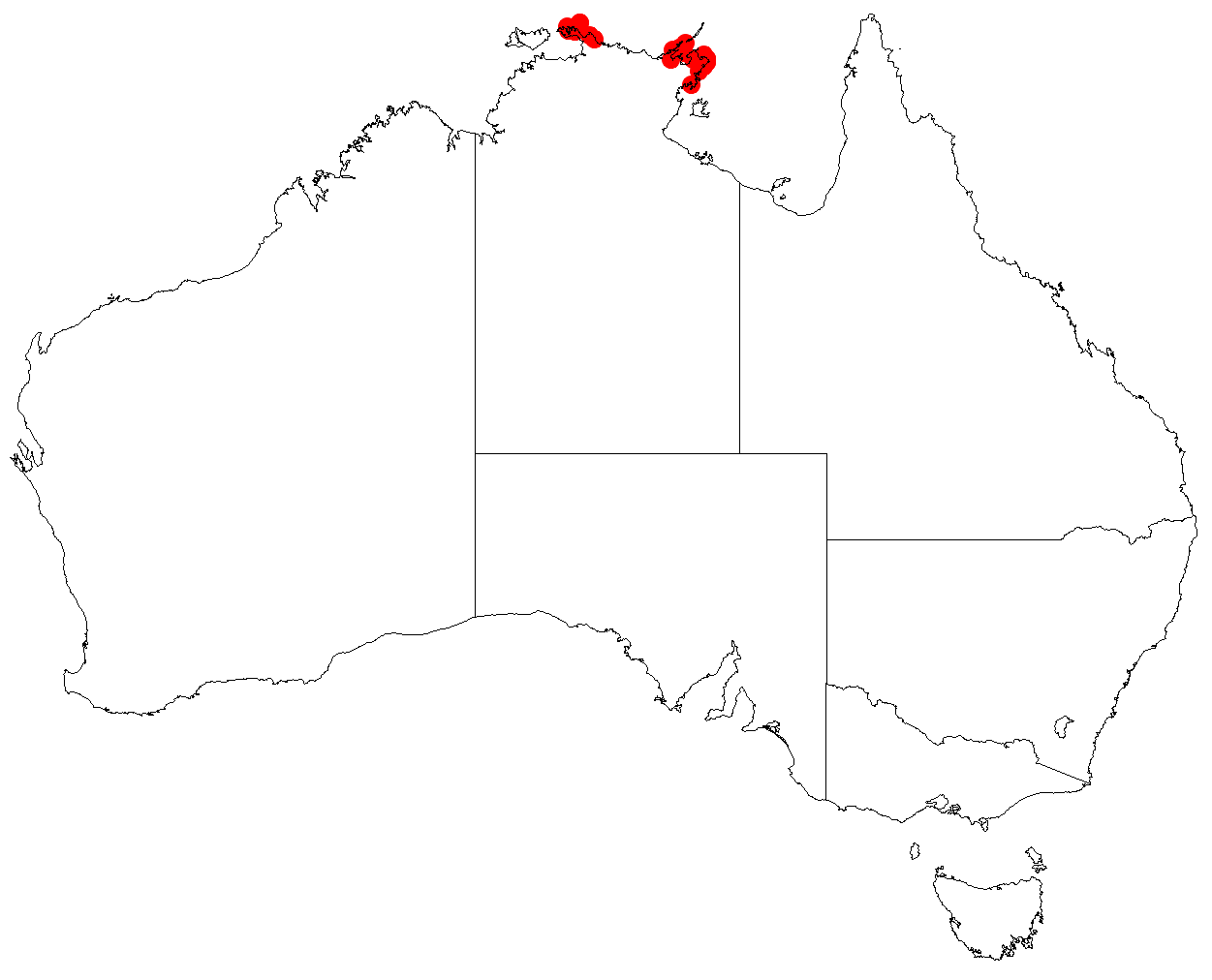
- Occurrence data from AVH

Species of flowering plant

Harpullia leichhardtii is a species of flowering plant in the family Sapindaceae, and is endemic to the Northern Territory. It is a tree with 4 to 8 paripinnate leaves, the leaflets oblong to elliptic, curved and papery, greenish-yellow flowers, and yellow-orange capsules.

== Description ==
Harpullia leichhardtii is a tree that typically grows to a height of up to 8 m (26 ft). The shoots and peduncles are covered with soft hairs, but otherwise the tree is glabrous. The leaves are paripinnate with 4 to 8 leaflets, the rachis of the leaf 50–175 mm (2.0–6.9 in) long, the leaflets egg-shaped to elliptic, 55–180 mm (2.2–7.1 in) long and 25–80 mm (0.98–3.15 in) wide. The flowers are greenish-yellow and borne in clusters up to 110 mm (4.3 in) long in leaf axils, each flower on a pedicel 6–10 mm (0.24–0.39 in) long. The sepals are elliptic, 6–7 mm (0.24–0.28 in) long, and covered with woolly hairs, the petals 7.5 mm (0.30 in) long and there are five stamens. The ovary is velvety and the style is short. There is one seed in each locule, nearly covered by the aril.

The leaves are very like those of Harpullia pendula, but in H. leichhardtii the sepals persist in the fruit and the seeds have well-developed arils.

== Taxonomy ==
Harpullia leichhardtii was first described in 1863 by George Bentham in his Flora Australiensis from a specimen collected at Port Essington by Ludwig Leichhardt.

An isotype, M-0225480, is held at M, the Munich Herbarium, and a holotype, MEL-71610, is held at MEL, the National Herbarium of Victoria, both specimens collected by Leichhardt at "Entrance Island", Port Essington.

== Distribution and habitat ==
This species of Harpullia grows in near-coastal areas of the Arnhem Coast and Tiwi Cobourg bioregions of far northern Northern Territory.
