= Lancewood =

Lancewood may refer to:

== Trees ==
- Acacia shirleyi, Acacia petraea and Acacia rothii, Australian trees
- Annona dolabripetala, a Brazilian tree in the genus Annona
- Backhousia subargentea, a rare Australian rainforest tree
- Backhousia myrtifolia, Australian lancewood
- Curtisia dentata, Cape lancewood
- Calycophyllum candidissimum, a tropical American tree in the genus Calycophyllum
- Dissiliaria baloghioides, an eastern Australian tree in the genus Dissiliaria
- Harpullia pendula, tulipwood or tulip lancewood, a small to medium-sized rainforest tree from Australia
- Harpullia arborea, a tree found in Asia and the Pacific
- Homalium spp., Homalium foetidum, Homalium bhamoense, Homalium tomentosum Moulmein lancewood etc., Burma lancewood
- Manilkara bidentata, Red lancewood
- Mosannona depressa, a tree from Central America in the genus Mosannona
- Nematolepis squamea, an Australian tree
- Olearia lacunosa, a shrub from New Zealand, lancewood tree daisy
- Oxandra spp., Oxandra lanceolata West Indian, Black or True lancewood, Oxandra laurifolia White or Laurelleaf lancewood etc., native to South America and the Caribbean
- Pseudopanax crassifolius Horoeka, a New Zealand tree
- Pseudopanax ferox, a New Zealand tree, Savage or Fierce lancewood and Toothed lancewood
- Xylopia hastarum, a Caribbean tree, White lancewood

== Other ==
- USS Lancewood (AN-48), a 1943 US Navy ship in World War II

== See also ==
- Tulipwood (disambiguation)
- Lance (disambiguation)
