= Cuban dry forests =

Topical dry forest ecoregion

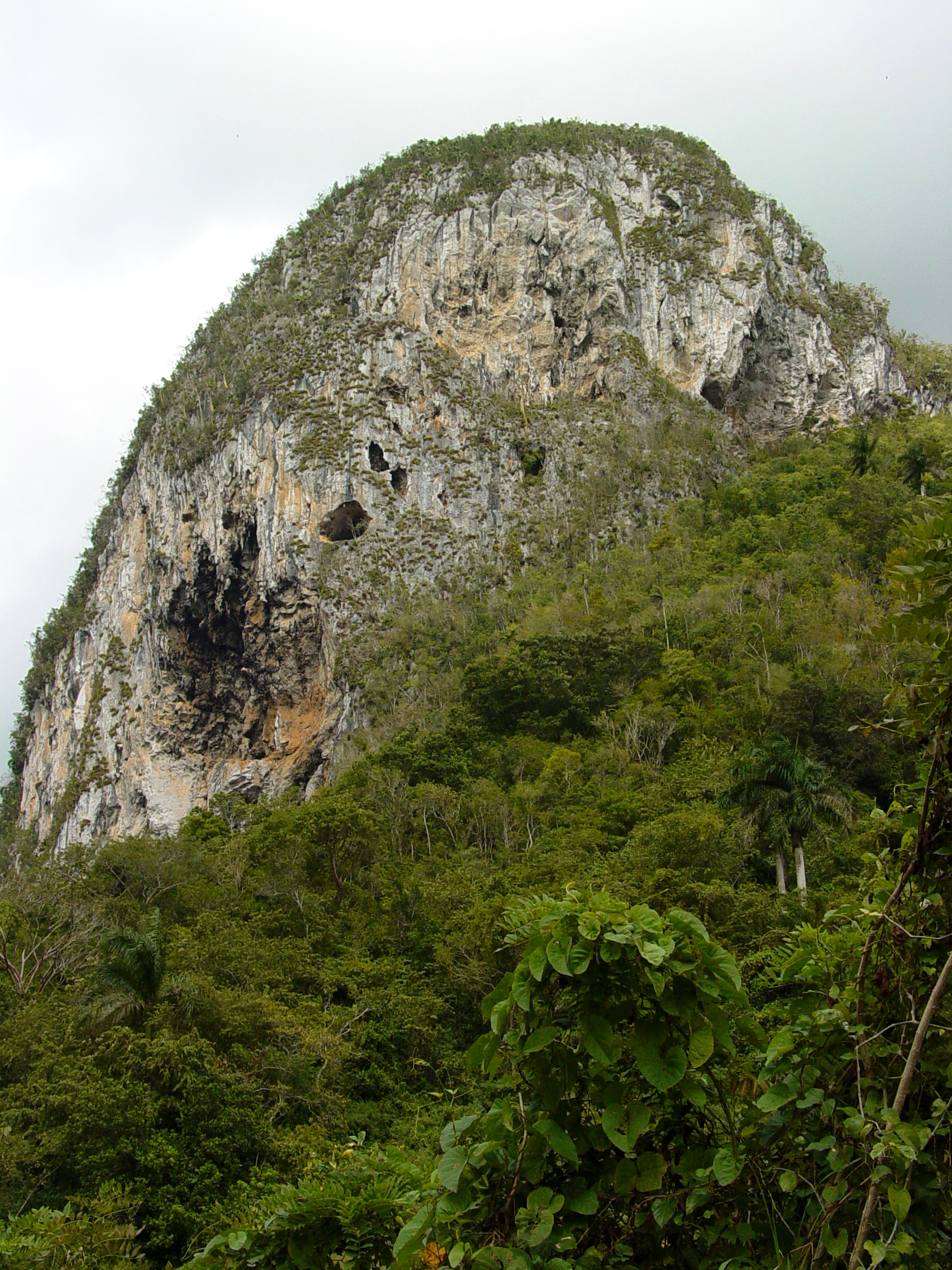
- Mogote, Pinar del Rio Province

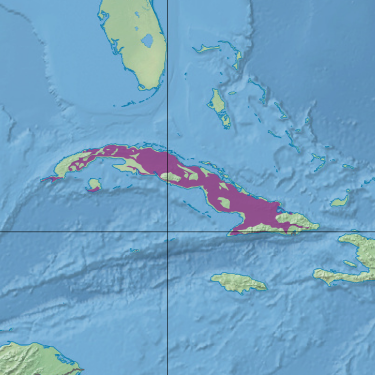
- Ecoregion territory (in purple)

Ecology
- Biome: Tropical and subtropical dry broadleaf forests
- Bird species: 246
- Mammal species: 34

Geography
- Area: 65,800 km^{2} (25,400 sq mi)
- Country: Cuba

Conservation
- Conservation status: Critical/endangered
- Habitat loss: 76.471%
- Protected: 6.36%

The Cuban dry forests are a tropical dry forest ecoregion that occupies 65,800 km^{2} (25,400 sq mi) on Cuba and Isla de la Juventud. The ecoregion receives 1,000–2,000 mm (39–79 in) of rainfall annually. Cuban dry forests can be differentiated into evergreen forests, semi-deciduous forests, mogotes, and sclerophyllous low forests.

== Evergreen forests ==
Less than 30% of all trees lose their leaves in evergreen forests, and there are few epiphytes or lianas. It is classified according to leaf length as being either mesophyllous (leaves 13–26 cm or 5.1–10.2 in) or microphyllous (leaves 1–6 cm or 0.39–2.36 in). Mesophyllous forest occurs at elevations from sea level to 400 metres (1,300 ft) or 400–800 m (1,300–2,600 ft). The canopy reaches a height of 15–25 metres (49–82 ft), while certain trees such as palms emerge at 25–30 m (82–98 ft). The upper layer of trees in Sierra del Rosario includes aguacatillo (Alchornea latifolia), ocuje (Calophyllum antillanum), jocuma (Sideroxylon foetidissimum) and macurije (Matayba oppositifolia). Yaya (Oxandra lanceolata), Wallenia laurifolia, ramón de caballo (Trophis racemosa) and Ficus species grow in the lower layer. Microphyllous evergreen forest establishes itself over coastal limestone. It has evergreen and deciduous trees that reach a height of 5–10 metres (16–33 ft) or 12–15 m (39–49 ft), some thorny shrubs, arborescent cacti, other succulents, epiphytes and dry lianas. Trees include júcaro espinoso (Bucida molinetii), cúrbana (Canella winterana), guayacán negro (Guaiacum sanctum), yaití (Gymnanthes lucida), cerillo (Hypelate trifoliata), soplillo (Lysiloma latisiliquum), guao de costa (Metopium toxiferum), almácigo (Bursera simaruba), caguairán amarillo (Hymenaea torrei), uvillón (Coccoloba diversifolia), and miraguanos (Coccothrinax spp.). Tuna (Opuntia stricta) is an important understory species.

== Semi-deciduous forests ==
About half of the trees in semi-deciduous forests are evergreen, along with shrubs, epiphytes, a few herbaceous plants, and many vines. Trees in this type of forest are often mesophyllous, with leaves 13–26 cm (5.1–10.2 in) long. The canopy in forests with consistent moisture reaches a height of 15–20 m (49–66 ft) and may have emergent species up to 30 m (98 ft) high as well as 25 m (82 ft) palms. The lower arboreal story includes deciduous and sclerophyllous evergreen trees. Soils are either red rendzinas, black rendzinas, or brown soils. Trees grow rapidly due to heavy rainfall during the summer. The upper layer of trees includes almácigo (Bursera simaruba), cedro-cheiroso (Cedrela odorata), dagame (Calophyllum candidissimum), ceiba (Ceiba pentandra), baría (Cordia gerascanthus), ateje (C. collococca), cuyá (Dipholis salicifolia), caoba (Swietenia mahagoni), ayúa (Zanthoxylum martinicense), guasiriano (Celtis trinervia) and palma real (Roystonea regia). The lower layer includes jía (Casearia hirsuta), guara (Cupania americana), yamagua (Guarea trichiloides), yaya (Oxandra lanceolata) and siguaraya (Trichilia havanensis). Forests with fluctuating moisture have an 8–15 m (26–49 ft) canopy, an understory of microphyllous and thorny deciduous species, and a forest floor covered in herbaceous geophytes.

== Mogotes ==
Mogotes are conical mountains composed of karstic limestone and are found in western Cuba. Forests found on mogotes are characterized by a discontinuous story of trees 5–10 m (16–33 ft) high, as well as palms, plentiful succulents, epiphytes, and lianas. Plant life includes palma barrigona de sierra (Gaussia princeps), guanito de sierra (Thrinax morrisii), roble (Tabebuia calcicola), piñón (Erythrina cubensis), Malpighia roigiana, palma corcho (Microcycas calocoma), Lantana strigosa, Agave spp., and Leptocereus spp. The vegetation on rock faces is bushy and very open and includes shrubs and trees with specially adapted roots, such as the endemic ceibón (Pachira emarginata).

== Sclerophyllous low forests ==
Sclerophyllous low forests are found growing on serpentine soils and represent the transition between the dry forests and xeric scrublands. This is subdivided into charrascales (wet sclerophyllous low forests) and cuabales (dry sclerophyllous low forests). Cuabales can reach heights of 8–10 m (26–33 ft), and palms and species with small, hard and very thorny leaves are abundant. Emergent trees can be found. Plant life includes cuabal (Leucocroton flavicans), anón del cuabal (Annona bullata), júcaro espinoso (Bucida molinetii), uverillo (Coccoloba praecox), chicharrón (Pseudocarpidium wrightii), palmas jatas (Copernicia spp.), miraguanos (Coccothrinax spp.), Buxus spp. Bourreria spp., robles (Tabebuia spp.), Guettarda spp., Rhodogeron coronopifolius and agave cajalbanensis.

== Fauna ==
Birds of the dry forests include the West Indian woodpecker (Melanerpes superciliaris), Fernandina's flicker (Colaptes fernandinae), Cuban green woodpecker (Xiphidiopicus percussus), and blue-headed quail-dove (Starnoenas cyanocephala). Reptiles include anoles, geckos, and the Cuban boa (Epicrates angulifer). Desmarest's hutia (Capromys pilorides) is a common species of mammal.
