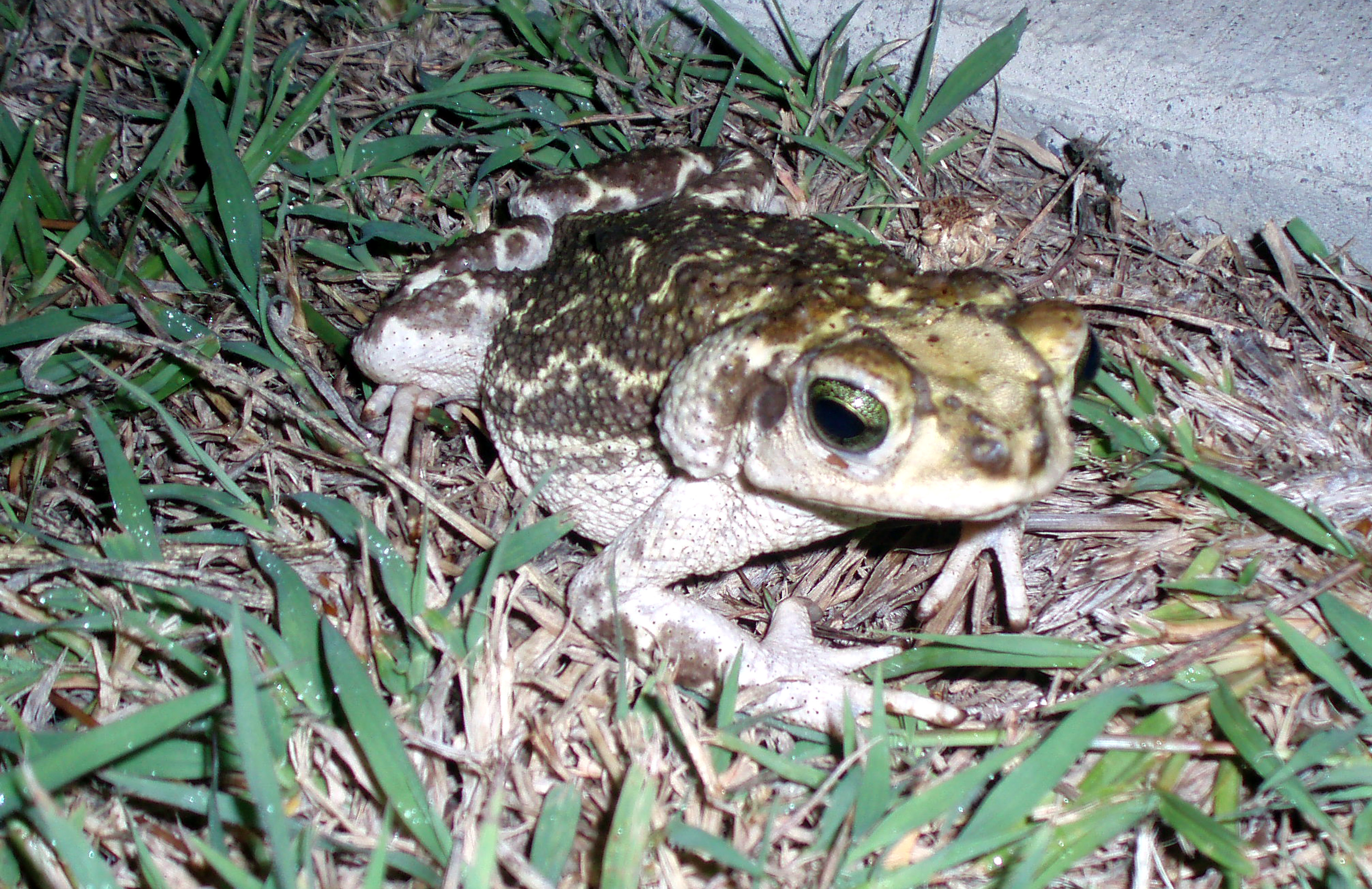

Conservation status
- Vulnerable (IUCN 3.1)

Scientific classification
- Kingdom: Animalia
- Phylum: Chordata
- Class: Amphibia
- Order: Anura
- Family: Bufonidae
- Genus: Peltophryne
- Species: P. empusa

Binomial name
- Peltophryne empusa Cope, 1862

Synonyms
- Bufo empusus (Cope, 1862)

= Cuban small-eared toad =

Species of amphibian

The Cuban small-eared toad (Peltophryne empusa), also known as the Cuban toad or Cope's Caribbean toad, is a species of toad in the family Bufonidae that is endemic to Cuba including Isla de Juventud.

== Description ==
Species description of Peltophryne empusa was published by Edward Drinker Cope in 1862 as an addendum to his work entitled "Notes upon some reptiles of the Old World" (reptiles and amphibians were not necessarily considered very distinct at that time):

Supraorbital ridges very prominent, not crenate, presenting a posterior process. Postorbital and supra-tympanic processes prominent, obtuse; preorbital straight, more acute. Canthus rostrales acute, converging so as to produce a very acute angle; their profile very declive, that of the muzzle more so, but not perpendicular. Maxillary region oblique from a front view; the labial border forming a prominent rim, which is thickened and everted posteriorly. Two occipital knobs on each side. Tympanum small, one-fourth or one-third the length of the palpebral border in diameter. Paratoid gland small, rounded, lateral, studded with warts; the dorsal region is similarly studded, most abundantly anteriorly. Sides, extremities and gular region covered with smaller warts; belly areolate. One large oval flat metacarpal tubercle; a large one at the base of the interior digit. Two metatarsal tubercles; the interior most elongate and acute, blackish brown. A short, thickened, internal tarsal fold. Toes half-webbed, palm slightly rugose.

Length from end of muzzle to tympanum 11 lines; of antebrachium and hand, 14.5 lines; axilla to vent, 2 inches; vent to end of fourth toe, 3 inches 1 line.

The head is brown; color elsewhere brownish yellow; on the nape and sides marbled with deep brown, somewhat oblique-longitudinally on the latter region. Limbs cross-banded with brown.

== Distribution and habitat ==
Peltophryne empusa has a wide but patchy distribution in xeric and mesic lowland forests and savannas of Cuba and the Isla de Juventud to 70 m (230 ft) asl. However, it burrows underground and is rarely seen except during the breeding season when it is abundant. It is an explosive breeder; males call from flooded ditches and large temporary pools of rainwater. Eggs are laid in still water.

== Conservation ==
Peltophryne empusa is assessed as a vulnerable species because its distribution area is less than 2,000 km^{2} and severely fragmented, and it is affected by habitat loss and degradation caused by agriculture, pollution (pesticides), and the invasive legume Dichrostachys cinerea. However, it occurs in several protected areas.
