= A. bakeri =

A. bakeri may refer to:

An abbreviation of a species name. In binomial nomenclature the name of a species is always the name of the genus to which the species belongs, followed by the species name (also called the species epithet). In A. bakeri the genus name has been abbreviated to A. and the species has been spelled out in full. In a document that uses this abbreviation it should always be clear from the context which genus name has been abbreviated.

Some of the most common uses of A. bakeri are:

- Acacia bakeri, the marblewood, a large acacia found in New South Wales, Australia
- Allium bakeri, a synonym for Allium chinense, an edible plant species
- Amphisbaena bakeri, a worm lizard species
- Arctostaphylos bakeri, the Baker's manzanita, a plant species endemic to Sonoma County, California
- Ardisia bakeri, a rare plant species in the genus Ardisia found in Queensland, Australia

== See also ==
- Bakeri (disambiguation)
