= Cuban long-nosed toad =

Conservation status
- Endangered (IUCN 3.1)

Scientific classification
- Kingdom: Animalia
- Phylum: Chordata
- Class: Amphibia
- Order: Anura
- Family: Bufonidae
- Genus: Peltophryne
- Species: P. longinasus

Binomial name
- Peltophryne longinasus (Stejneger, 1905)

Synonyms
- Bufo longinasus Stejneger, 1905

Species of amphibian

The Cuban long-nosed toad (Peltophryne longinasus), or Stejneger's Caribbean toad, is a species of toad in the family Bufonidae. It is endemic to Cuba and only known from three widely separated populations. Its natural habitats are upland pinewoods and mesic broadleaf forests. It is always found by streams. It is threatened by habitat loss caused by logging, charcoaling, fires, and agricultural expansion.
