= Tulipwood (disambiguation) =

Tulipwood is the pinkish yellowish wood yielded from the tulip tree, Liriodendron tulipifera.

Tulipwood may also refer to:

- Harpullia, trees native to rainforest margins in Australia
  - Harpullia pendula, tulipwood or tulip lancewood, a small to medium-sized rainforest tree from Australia
- Dalbergia cearensis, a small tree endemic to Brazil
- Liriodendron tulipifera, tulip tree or tulipwood, a tree native to North America
- Tulipwood (Somerset, New Jersey), a historic home listed on the U.S. National Register of Historic Places, in New Jersey

== See also ==
- Lancewood (disambiguation)
