= Cuban pine toad =

Conservation status
- Endangered (IUCN 3.1)

Scientific classification
- Kingdom: Animalia
- Phylum: Chordata
- Class: Amphibia
- Order: Anura
- Family: Bufonidae
- Genus: Peltophryne
- Species: P. cataulaciceps

Binomial name
- Peltophryne cataulaciceps (Schwartz, 1959)

Synonyms
- Bufo cataulaciceps Schwartz, 1959

Species of amphibian

The Cuban pine toad (Peltophryne cataulaciceps), or Schwartz's Caribbean toad, is a species of toad in the family Bufonidae.

== Distribution and habitat ==
It is endemic to Cuba and found in western Cuba and on the Isla de la Juventud, below 70 m (230 ft) above sea level. Its natural habitats are savannas with pinewood, palms, and sandy soils. Breeding takes place in temporary pools, flooded pastures, and other shallow bodies of standing water; it can be abundant at breeding aggregations, but is otherwise hard to see.

== Conservation ==
It is threatened by habitat loss caused by agriculture and sand extraction. Its habitat is also threatened by the invasive tree, Dichrostachys cinerea.
