= Oxandra leucodermis =

Conservation status
- Least Concern (IUCN 3.1)

Scientific classification
- Kingdom: Plantae
- Clade: Embryophytes
- Clade: Tracheophytes
- Clade: Spermatophytes
- Clade: Angiosperms
- Clade: Magnoliids
- Order: Magnoliales
- Family: Annonaceae
- Genus: Oxandra
- Species: O. leucodermis

Binomial name
- Oxandra leucodermis (Spruce ex Benth.) Warm.

Synonyms
- Bocagea leucodermis Spruce ex Benth.

Species of flowering plant

Oxandra leucodermis is a species of flowering plant in the Annonaceae family. It is a tree native to northern Brazil, Colombia, Peru, and Venezuela.
