= Cuban high-crested toad =

Conservation status
- Vulnerable (IUCN 3.1)

Scientific classification
- Kingdom: Animalia
- Phylum: Chordata
- Class: Amphibia
- Order: Anura
- Family: Bufonidae
- Genus: Peltophryne
- Species: P. gundlachi

Binomial name
- Peltophryne gundlachi (Ruibal, 1959)

Synonyms
- Bufo gundlachi Ruibal, 1959

Species of amphibian

The Cuban high-crested toad (Peltophryne gundlachi), or Gundlach's Caribbean toad, is a species of toad in the family Bufonidae that is endemic to Cuba.

The specific name gundlachi honors Juan Gundlach, a Cuban zoologist.

== Distribution and habitat ==
It is found plains in all provinces as well as Isla de la Juventud and the Sabana-Camagüey Archipelago. Its natural habitats are primarily forests but also xeric and mesic grasslands. It is an explosive breeder of rain-flooded pools.

== Conservation ==
It is threatened by habitat loss and degradation caused by agriculture, and by agricultural pollution. Its habitat is also threatened by the invasive tree Dichrostachys cinerea.
