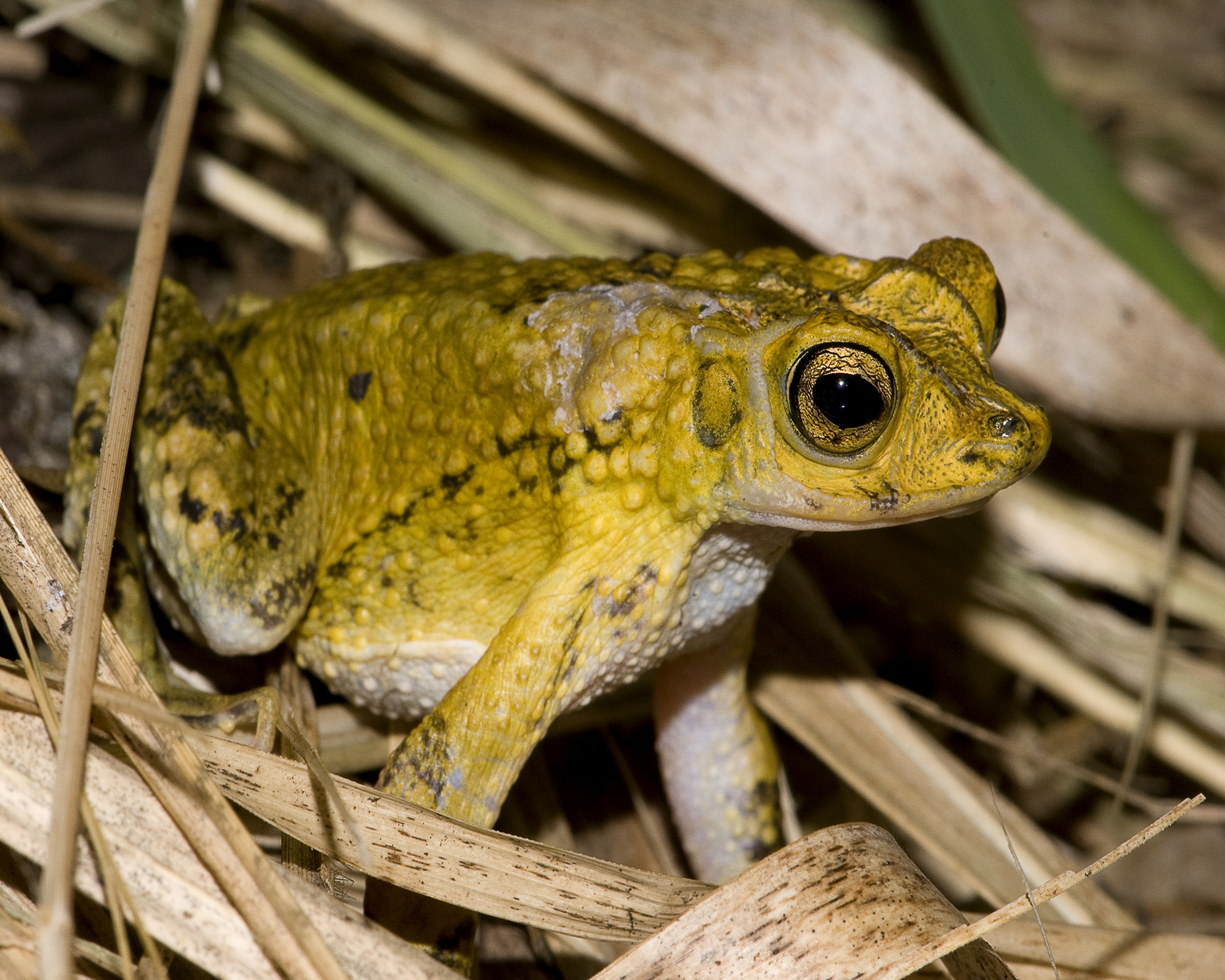
- Peltophryne lemur

Scientific classification
- Kingdom: Animalia
- Phylum: Chordata
- Class: Amphibia
- Order: Anura
- Family: Bufonidae
- Genus: Peltophryne; Fitzinger, 1843

Type species
- Bufo peltocephalus Tschudi, 1838

Species
- See text

= Peltophryne =

Genus of amphibians

Peltophryne is a genus of true toads in the family Bufonidae, from the Greater Antilles (in Cuba, Isla de Juventud, Hispaniola, and Puerto Rico). With ten endemic species, Cuba hosts the highest diversity. Hispaniola has three endemics and Puerto Rico and the Virgin Islands combined have one.

== Description ==
Peltophryne range is size from the relatively small Peltophryne cataulaciceps with a snout–vent length (SVL) of 30 mm (1.2 in) to the large Peltophryne peltocephala with SVL of 170 mm (6.7 in). The skull is as long as wide and contains some unique osteological features (thickened dermal tissue covering the snout and usually ossified into a pair of rostral bones, and squamosal-maxillary articulation). These are considered to be derived characters that set these toads apart from other bufonids.

== Taxonomy ==
The genus was erected by Leopold Fitzinger in 1843, but placed in synonymy with Bufo by Albert Günther in 1859. Subsequent work has considered Peltophryne either as a valid genus, a subgenus, or a synonym of Bufo. At present, treating Peltophryne as a valid genus has largely been accepted based on both morphological characters and genetic evidence, but treating it as a subgenus of Bufo still has a small following.

== Species ==
There are 14 species in this genus:

- Peltophryne armata Landestoy T., Turner, Marion, and Hedges, 2018
- Peltophryne cataulaciceps (Schwartz, 1959)
- Peltophryne dunni (Barbour, 1926)
- Peltophryne empusa Cope, 1862
- Peltophryne florentinoi (Moreno and Rivalta, 2007)
- Peltophryne fluviatica (Schwartz, 1972)
- Peltophryne fustiger (Schwartz, 1960)
- Peltophryne guentheri (Cochran, 1941)
- Peltophryne gundlachi (Ruibal, 1959)
- Peltophryne lemur Cope, 1869
- Peltophryne longinasus (Stejneger, 1905)
- Peltophryne peltocephala (Tschudi, 1838)
- Peltophryne ramsdeni (Barbour, 1914 )
- Peltophryne taladai (Schwartz, 1960)

== Conservation ==
The International Union for Conservation of Nature has assessed many of the species as "Critically Endangered" (Peltophryne florentinoi, Peltophryne fluviatica, and Peltophryne lemur) or "Endangered" (Peltophryne cataulaciceps, Peltophryne guentheri, and Peltophryne longinasus), primarily due to habitat loss from development. Surviving wild populations of Peltophryne lemur have been supported by captive bred animals.
