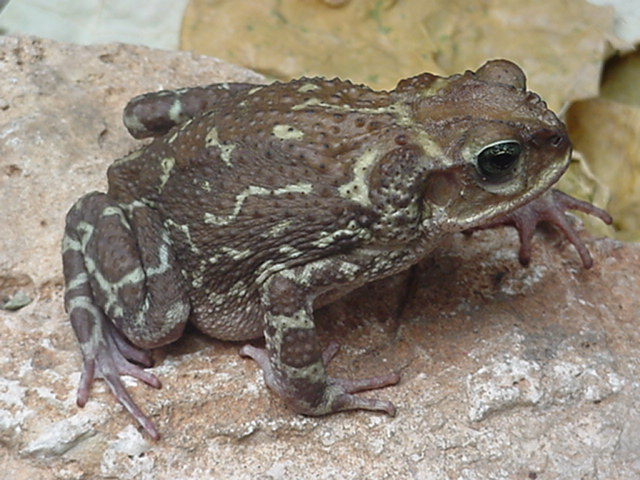

Conservation status
- Least Concern (IUCN 3.1)

Scientific classification
- Kingdom: Animalia
- Phylum: Chordata
- Class: Amphibia
- Order: Anura
- Family: Bufonidae
- Genus: Peltophryne
- Species: P. peltocephala

Binomial name
- Peltophryne peltocephala (Tschudi, 1838)

Synonyms
- Bufo peltocephalus Tschudi, 1838

= Peltophryne peltocephala =

Species of amphibian

Peltophryne peltocephala is a species of toad in the family Bufonidae. It is endemic to Cuba and found in central and eastern Cuba as well as on some outlying islands. It occurs in a range of habitats including broadleaf forest, grassland, savanna, and agricultural areas. It is a common species but locally threatened by habitat loss.
