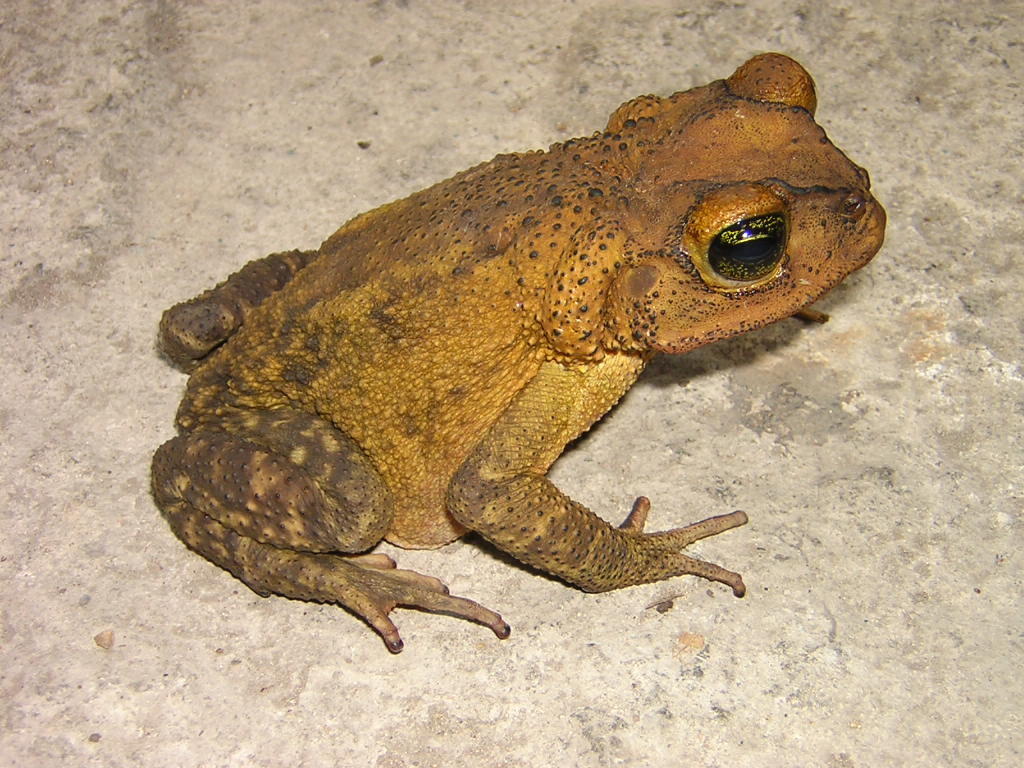

Conservation status
- Vulnerable (IUCN 3.1)

Scientific classification
- Kingdom: Animalia
- Phylum: Chordata
- Class: Amphibia
- Order: Anura
- Family: Bufonidae
- Genus: Peltophryne
- Species: P. taladai

Binomial name
- Peltophryne taladai (Schwartz, 1960)

Synonyms
- Bufo taladai Schwartz, 1960

= Cuban spotted toad =

Species of amphibian

The Cuban spotted toad (Peltophryne taladai), or Cuban Caribbean toad, is a species of toad in the family Bufonidae. It is endemic to central and eastern Cuba. Its natural habitats are lowland mesic broadleaf forests, but it also occurs on cultivated fields as long as they are not too intensively farmed. It is common in suitable habitat but its distribution is severely fragmented and its habitat is threatened by intensive agriculture, charcoaling, and nickel mining.
