= Wallenia xylosteoides =

Conservation status
- Vulnerable (IUCN 2.3)

Scientific classification
- Kingdom: Plantae
- Clade: Tracheophytes
- Clade: Angiosperms
- Clade: Eudicots
- Clade: Asterids
- Order: Ericales
- Family: Primulaceae
- Genus: Wallenia
- Species: W. xylosteoides

Binomial name
- Wallenia xylosteoides (Griseb.) Mez

Synonyms
- Ardisia xylosteoides Griseb.; Tinus xylosteoides (Griseb.) Kuntze

Species of flowering plant

Wallenia xylosteoides is a species of plant in the family Primulaceae. It is endemic to Jamaica. It is threatened by habitat loss.
