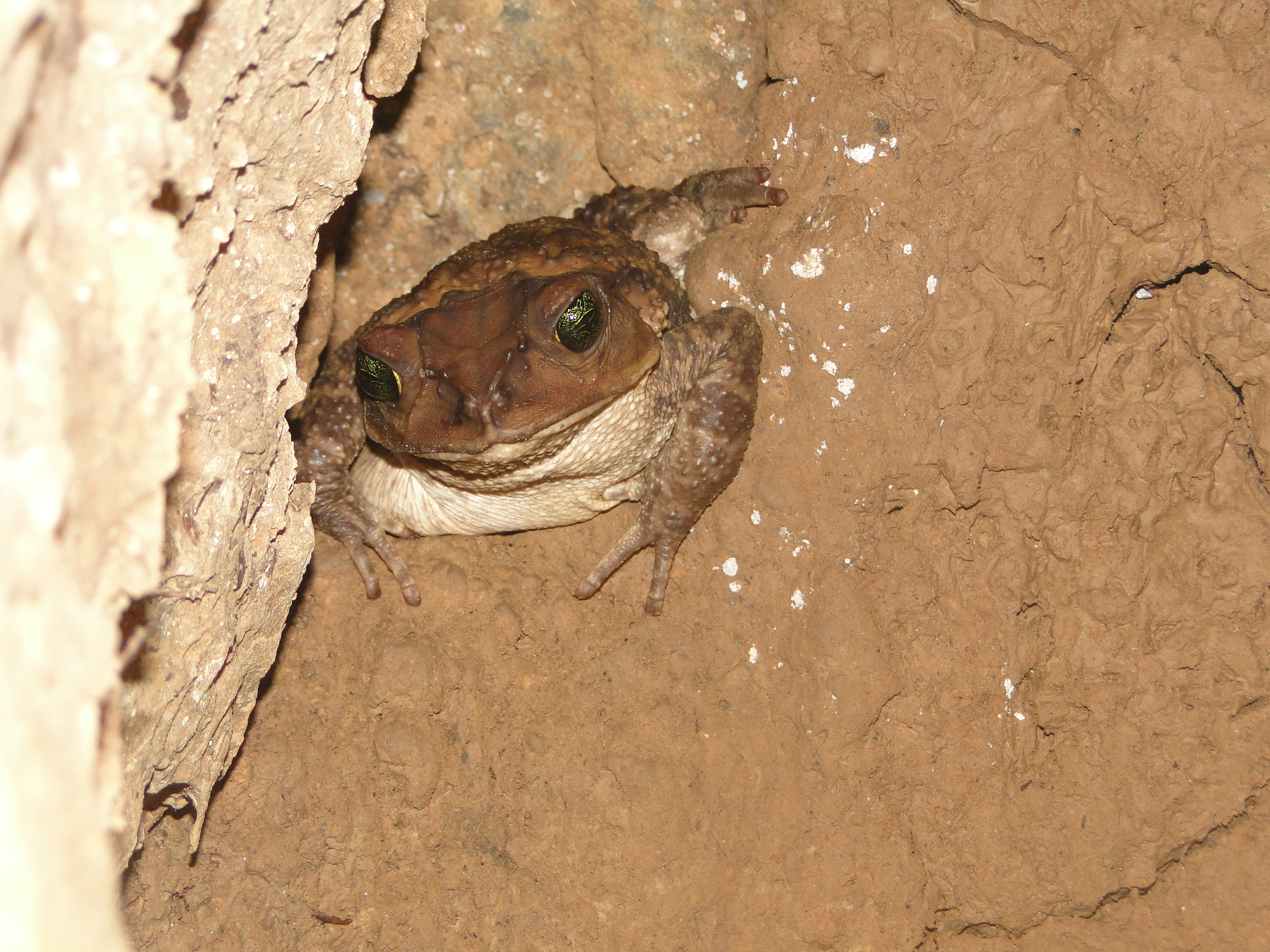

Conservation status
- Least Concern (IUCN 3.1)

Scientific classification
- Kingdom: Animalia
- Phylum: Chordata
- Class: Amphibia
- Order: Anura
- Family: Bufonidae
- Genus: Peltophryne
- Species: P. fustiger

Binomial name
- Peltophryne fustiger (Schwartz, 1960)

Synonyms
- Bufo fustiger Schwartz, 1960

= Western giant toad =

Species of amphibian

The western giant toad (Peltophryne fustiger) is a species of toad in the family Bufonidae that is endemic to western Cuba. It occurs in a range of habitats including broadleaf forest, grassland, savanna, and agricultural areas. It is a common species but it can be locally threatened by habitat loss.
