= Mosannona garwoodiae =

Conservation status
- Least Concern (IUCN 3.1)

Scientific classification
- Kingdom: Plantae
- Clade: Embryophytes
- Clade: Tracheophytes
- Clade: Spermatophytes
- Clade: Angiosperms
- Clade: Magnoliids
- Order: Magnoliales
- Family: Annonaceae
- Genus: Mosannona
- Species: M. garwoodiae

Binomial name
- Mosannona garwoodiae Chatrou & Welzenis

Species of tree in the family Annonaceae

Mosannona garwoodiae (syn. Mosannona garwoodii, orth. var.) is a rainforest tree endemic to Panama and belonging to the custard-apple family Annonaceae. The laurel-like leaves have a unique color, the underside being described as "sky blue". The flowers have about twenty carpels each developing into a separate berry. The species was discovered circa 2010 on Barro Colorado Island by Dr. Nancy Garwood.
