= Mosannona pachiteae =

Conservation status
- Vulnerable (IUCN 3.1)

Scientific classification
- Kingdom: Plantae
- Clade: Embryophytes
- Clade: Tracheophytes
- Clade: Spermatophytes
- Clade: Angiosperms
- Clade: Magnoliids
- Order: Magnoliales
- Family: Annonaceae
- Genus: Mosannona
- Species: M. pachiteae

Binomial name
- Mosannona pachiteae (D.R.Simpson) Chatrou

Synonyms
- Malmea pachiteae D.R.Simpson

Species of plant

Mosannona pachiteae is a species of flowering plant within the Annonaceae family. It is a tree native to northern Brazil and Peru.
