= Wallenia corymbosa =

Conservation status
- Near Threatened (IUCN 2.3)

Scientific classification
- Kingdom: Plantae
- Clade: Tracheophytes
- Clade: Angiosperms
- Clade: Eudicots
- Clade: Asterids
- Order: Ericales
- Family: Primulaceae
- Genus: Wallenia
- Species: W. corymbosa

Binomial name
- Wallenia corymbosa Urb.

Species of flowering plant

Wallenia corymbosa is a species of plant in the family Primulaceae. It is endemic to Jamaica.
