= Peltophryne fluviatica =

Conservation status
- Critically endangered, possibly extinct (IUCN 3.1)

Scientific classification
- Kingdom: Animalia
- Phylum: Chordata
- Class: Amphibia
- Order: Anura
- Family: Bufonidae
- Genus: Peltophryne
- Species: P. fluviatica

Binomial name
- Peltophryne fluviatica (Schwartz, 1972)

Synonyms
- Bufo fluviaticus Schwartz, 1972

Species of amphibian

Peltophryne fluviatica, also known as the Dominican Caribbean toad or Hispaniolan crestless toad, is a species of toad endemic to the Cibao Valley in the northwestern Dominican Republic. It has only been recorded at two localities.

== Description ==
Males measure 33–44 mm (1.3–1.7 in) in snout–vent length; the size of females are unknown. Snout is acuminate and tympanum is distinct. Dorsum bears numerous scattered small warts; those in the paratoid areas are more prominent. Dorsal ground color is green, from bright to olive. There are often bright yellow—orange spots or blotches and a light tan—yellow middorsal hairline.

== Habitat ==
Peltophryne fluviatica occurs in xeric habitats with broadleaf gallery forest, usually close to streams. Males call from shallow running water. Eggs are deposited in still water.

== Conservation ==
Peltophryne fluviatica is listed as a Critically Endangered or possibly extinct species due to a restricted range and continual habitat loss. The species has not been seen since it was described in 1972 and features on the list of "Lost Frogs". It is uncertain whether it still exists in the wild.
