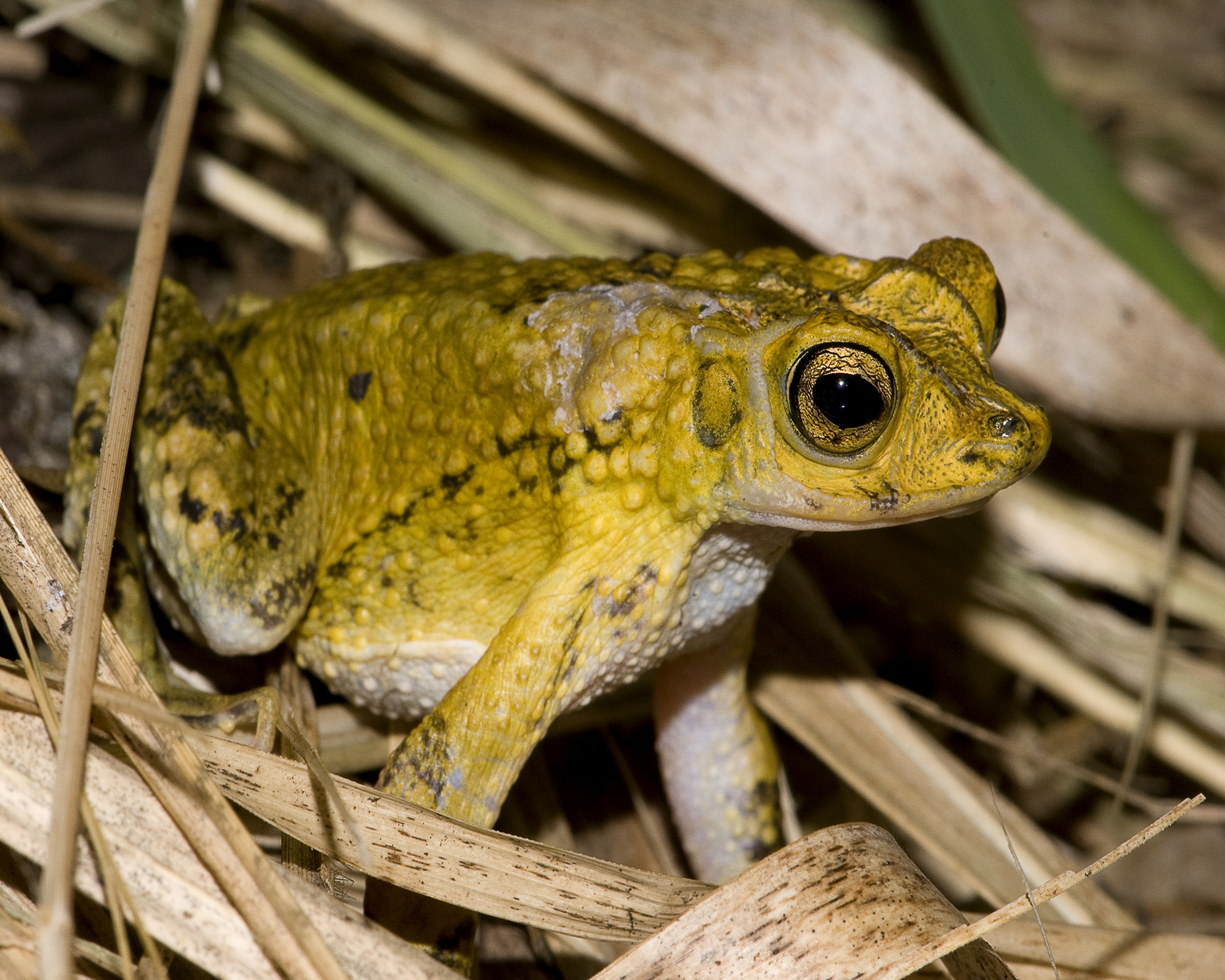

Conservation status
- Endangered (IUCN 3.1)

- Threatened (ESA)

Scientific classification
- Kingdom: Animalia
- Phylum: Chordata
- Class: Amphibia
- Order: Anura
- Family: Bufonidae
- Genus: Peltophryne
- Species: P. lemur

Binomial name
- Peltophryne lemur Cope, 1869
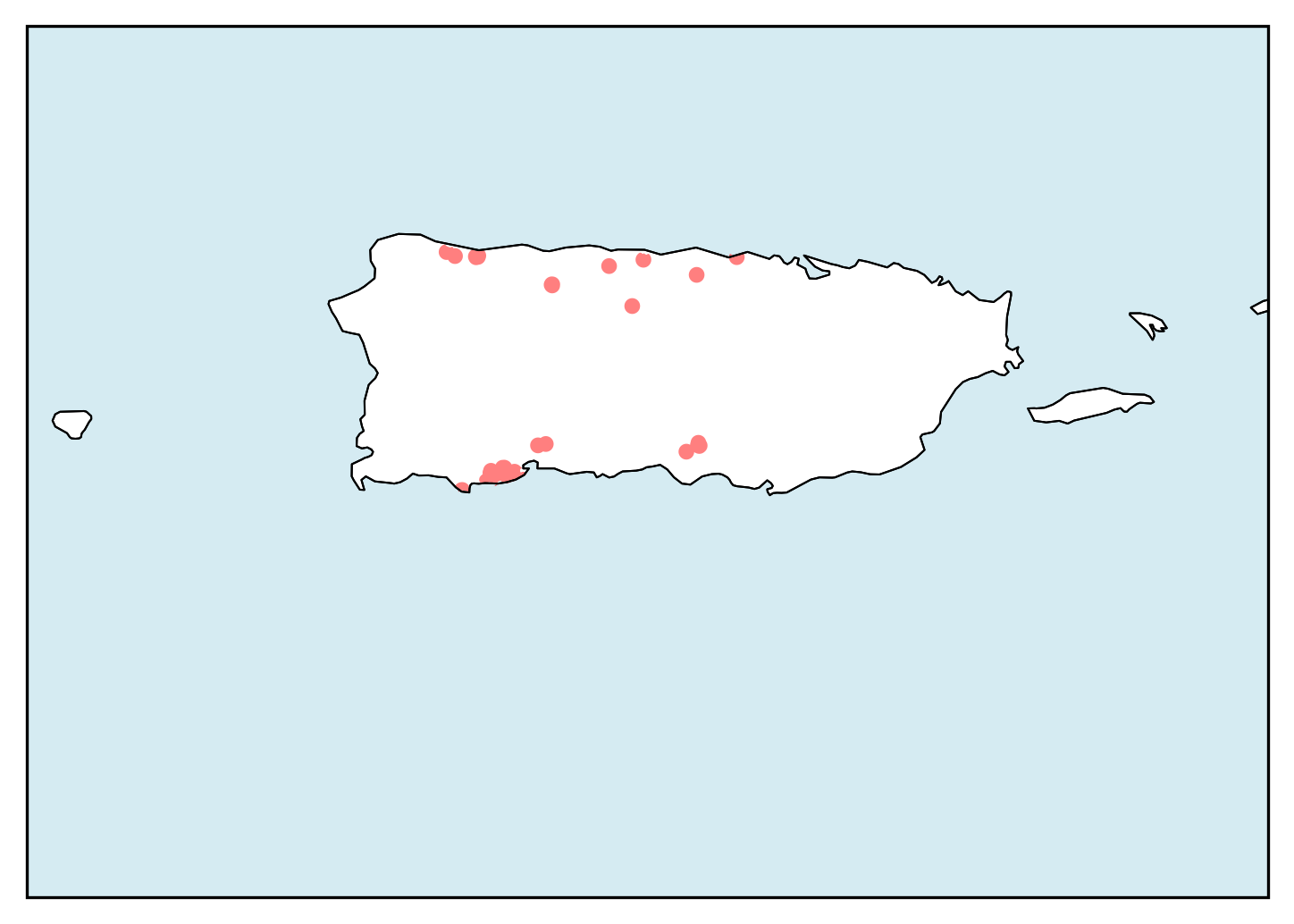
- Current range in Puerto Rico

Synonyms
- Bufo lemur (Cope, 1869)

= Puerto Rican crested toad =

Species of amphibian

The Puerto Rican crested toad (Peltophryne lemur), also known as the Puerto Rican toad or lowland Caribbean toad, locally known as sapo concho is a species of toad found only in Puerto Rico and the Virgin Islands. It is the only species of toad native to Puerto Rico and the Virgin Islands. The species formerly occurred in Virgin Gorda and along the southern and northern karst in Puerto Rico. It is listed as threatened by the US Fish and Wildlife Service due to habitat loss and introduced species. At one period of time it was believed to be extinct until it was rediscovered in 1966. The IUCN has the species listed as endangered.

== Conservation ==
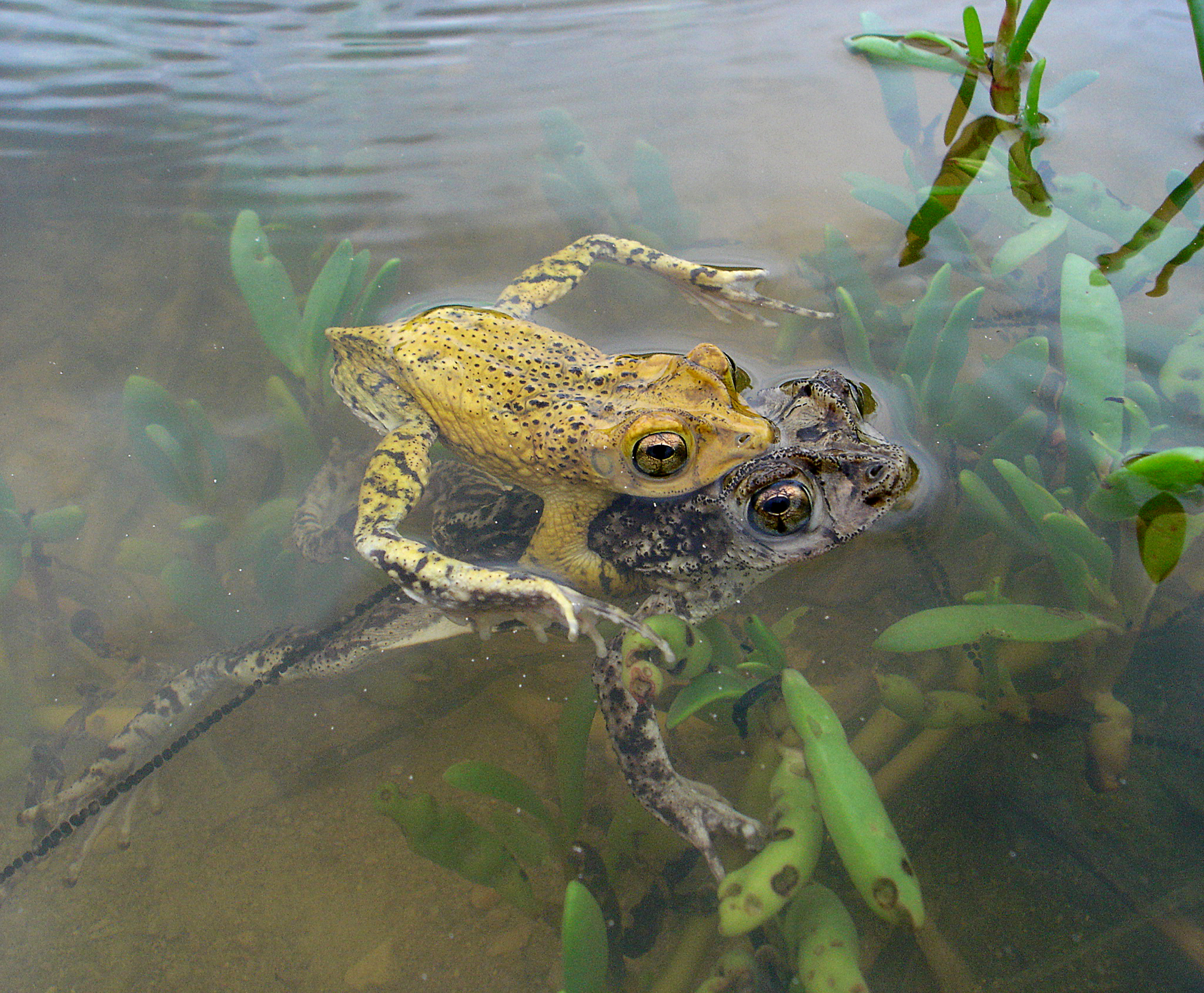
A pair in amplexus

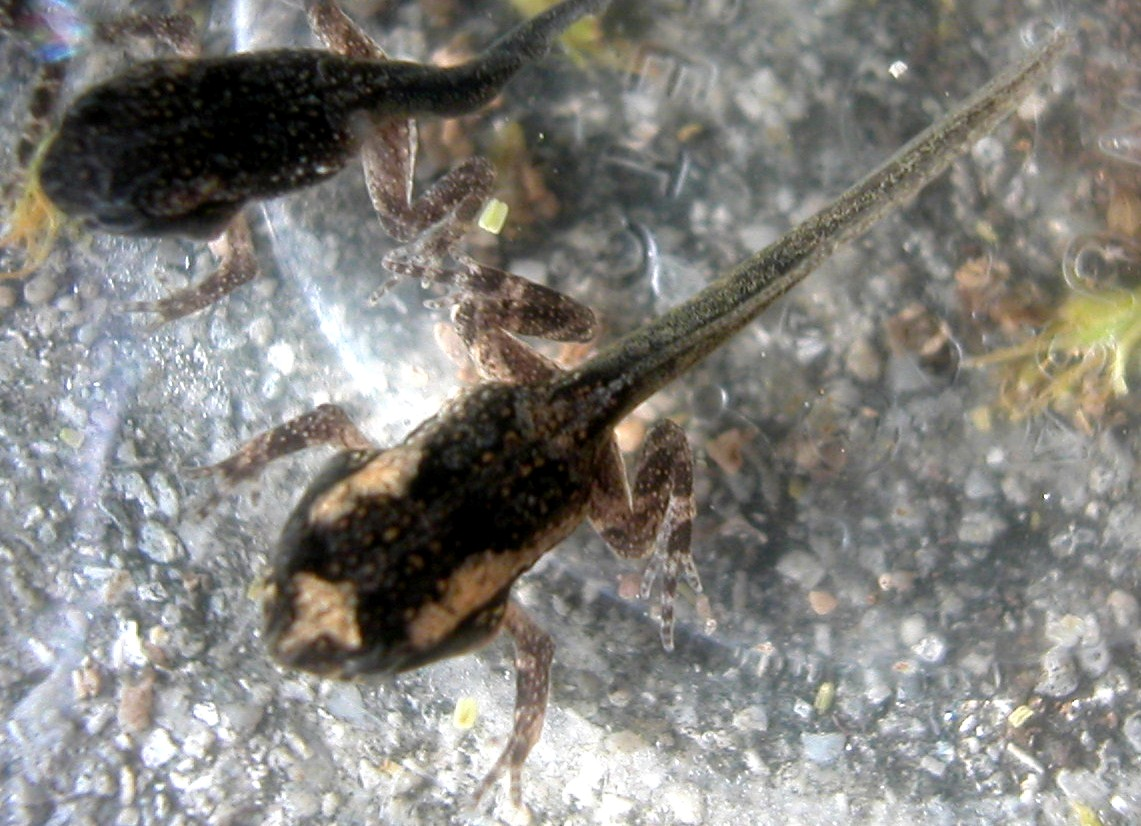
Metamorphosis of P. lemur nearly complete

The U.S. Fish and Wildlife Service, the Puerto Rico Department of Natural and Environmental Resources, and the American Association of Zoos and Aquariums have worked together to create a captive breeding program run by the American Association of Zoos and Aquariums. In 2013, the group released 71,000 tadpoles and 520 toadlets across three locations. The group has released 260,000 tadpoles over the last twenty years.

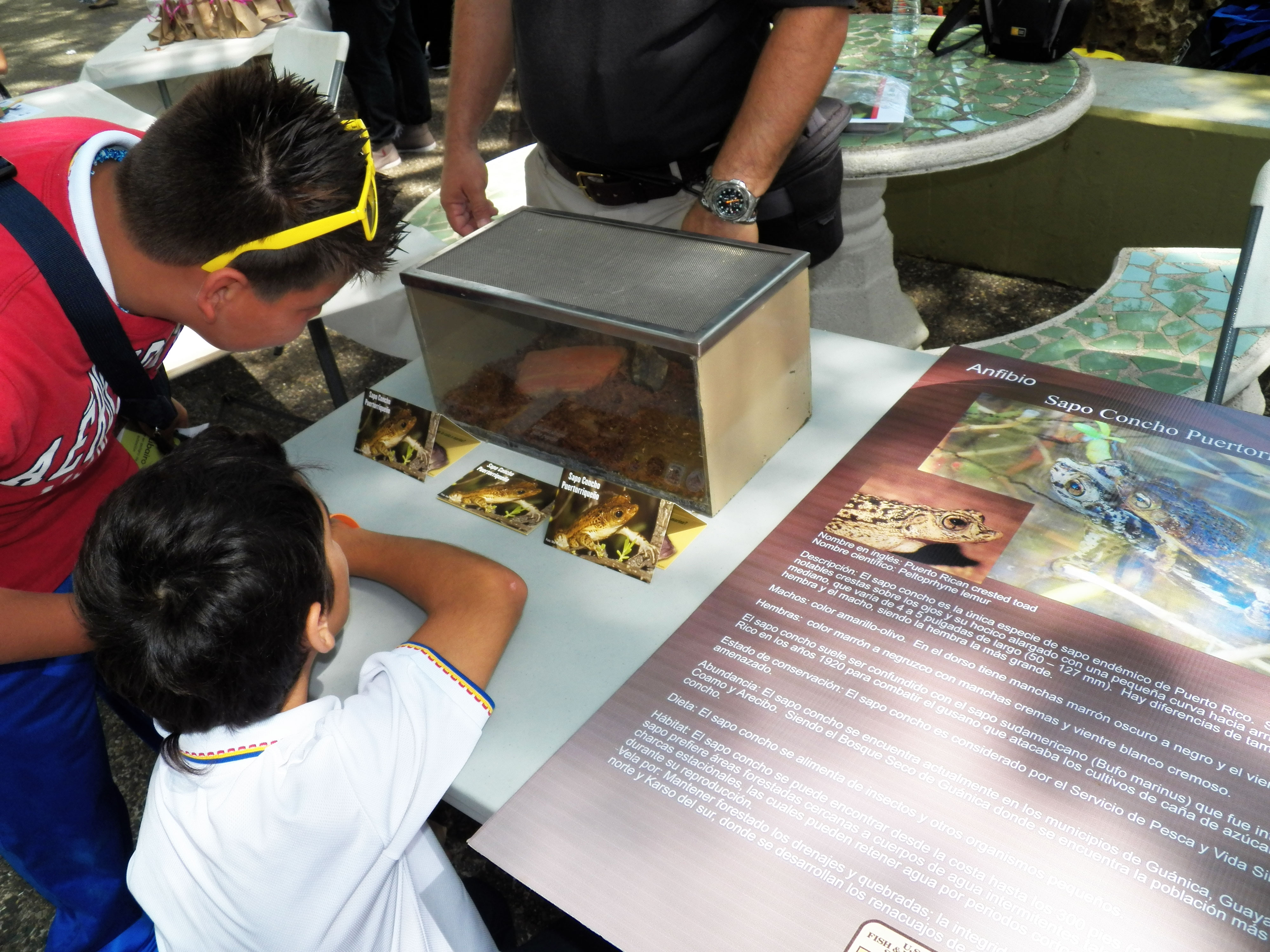
Two children look at the Sapo Concho (as it is called in Puerto Rico) at a table set up by the US Fish and Wildlife Service, in 2012.

In 2019, another 8,000 tadpoles were sent to Puerto Rico from the Detroit Zoological Society.

In November 2019 the first Puerto Rican crested toad was born as a result of in vitro.

Another 24,000 tadpoles were sent to Puerto Rico from the Jacksonville Zoo and Gardens in 2025, bringing a lifetime total from the zoo to 51,117.

In June of 2026, the Detroit Zoological Society sent 6,855 Puerto Rican crested toad tadpoles to be released at Rio Encantado, near Manatí, Puerto Rico. This latest release brings the Detroit Zoo's all-time total to 143,195 tadpoles raised and released to date.

In October of 2026, Potter Park Zoo in Lansing, Michigan, announced that after sending their most recent round of tadpoles, they had reached a total of more than 26,000 tadpoles sent from Lansing to Puerto Rico since joining the recovery program in 2009.

== In popular culture ==
In 2025, the rapper Bad Bunny created the character Concho, a Puerto Rican Crested Toad, in order to promote his new album Debí Tirar Más Fotos. The song and consequent use of Puerto Rican crested toad as a promotional image of the album has had a strong impact on its conservation.

== See also ==
- Puerto Rico Zoological Society
- List of endangered amphibians
