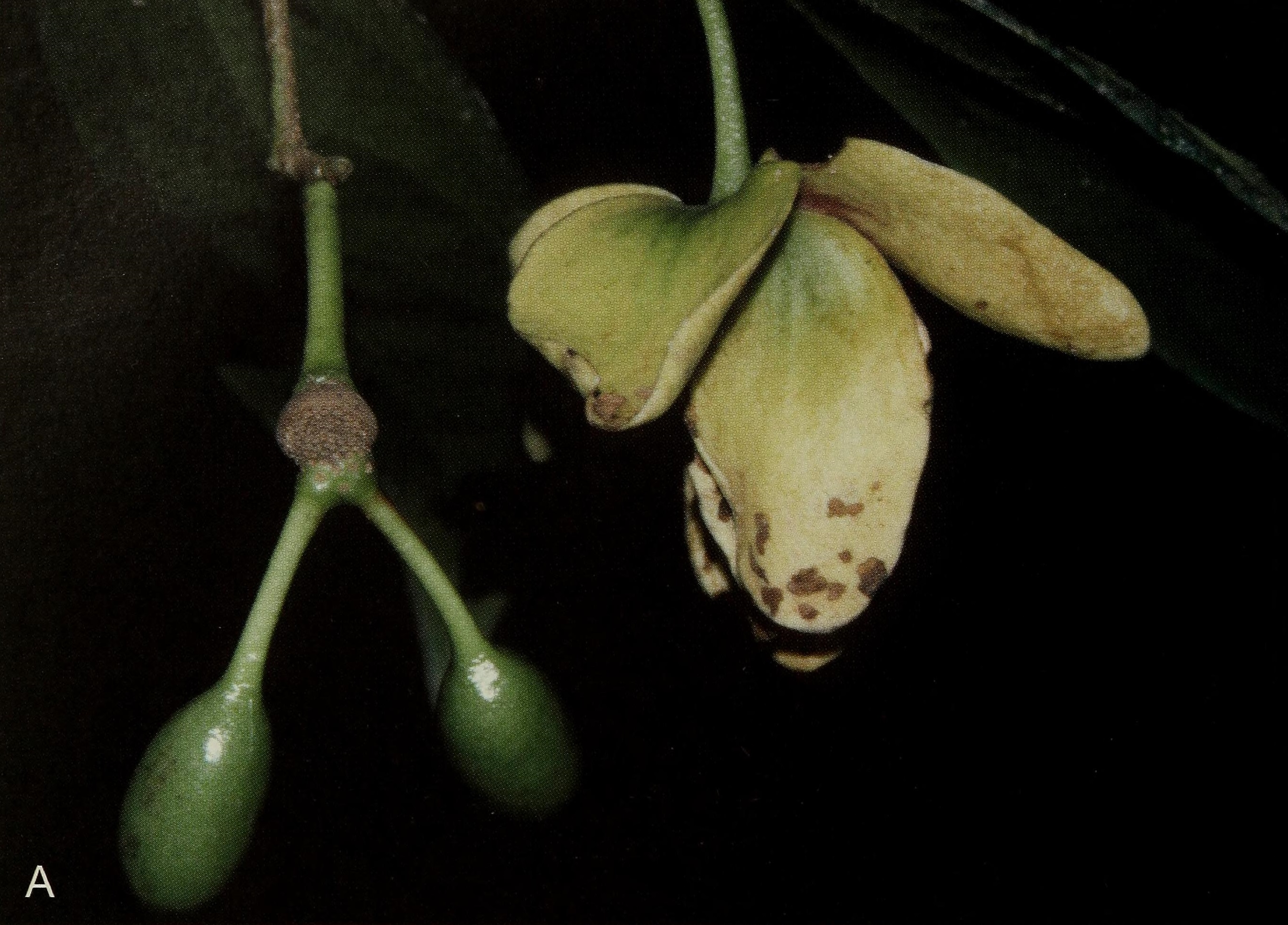
- Mosannona pacifica

Scientific classification
- Kingdom: Plantae
- Clade: Embryophytes
- Clade: Tracheophytes
- Clade: Spermatophytes
- Clade: Angiosperms
- Clade: Magnoliids
- Order: Magnoliales
- Family: Annonaceae
- Genus: Mosannona; Chatrou

= Mosannona =

Genus of flowering plants

Mosannona is a genus of flowering plants in the family Annonaceae. There are about 14 species native to the Neotropics, distributed from Mexico through Central America and South America particularly in rainforest surrounding the Andes.

== Species ==
14 species are accepted.

- Mosannona costaricensis (R.E.Fr.) Chatrou
- Mosannona depressa (Baill.) Chatrou
- Mosannona discolor (R.E.Fr.) Chatrou
- Mosannona garwoodiae Chatrou & Welzenis
- Mosannona guatemalensis (Lundell) Chatrou
- Mosannona hypoglauca (Standl.) Chatrou
- Mosannona maculata Chatrou & Welzenis
- Mosannona pachiteae (D.R.Simpson) Chatrou
- Mosannona pacifica Chatrou
- Mosannona papillosa Chatrou
- Mosannona parva Chatrou
- Mosannona raimondii (Diels) Chatrou
- Mosannona vasquezii Chatrou
- Mosannona xanthochlora (Diels) Chatrou
