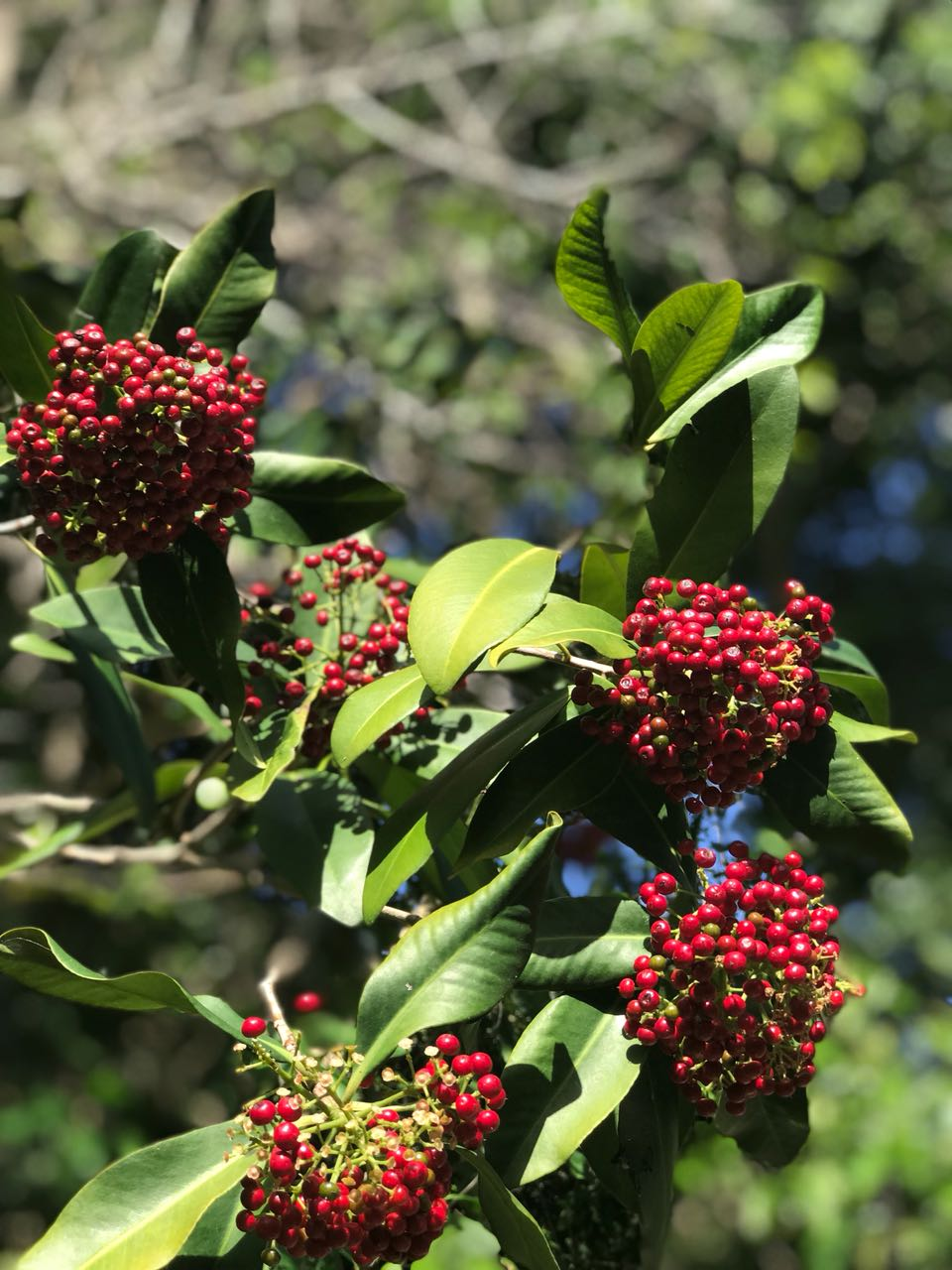
- Wallenia laurifolia

Scientific classification
- Kingdom: Plantae
- Clade: Embryophytes
- Clade: Tracheophytes
- Clade: Spermatophytes
- Clade: Angiosperms
- Clade: Eudicots
- Clade: Asterids
- Order: Ericales
- Family: Primulaceae
- Subfamily: Myrsinoideae
- Genus: Wallenia; Sw.

Synonyms
- Petesioides

= Wallenia =

Genus of flowering plants

Wallenia is a genus of flowering plants in the family Primulaceae endemic to the West Indies. It is composed of 29 species. It also includes a subgenus, Homowallenia, with ten species from the northern Caribbean.

== Species ==
- Wallenia apiculata Urb.
- Wallenia aquifolia Urb. & Ekman
- Wallenia bumelioides (Griseb.) Mez
- Wallenia calyptrata Urb.
- Wallenia clusioides (Griseb.) Mez
- Wallenia corymbosa Urb.
- Wallenia crassifolia Mez
- Wallenia discolor Urb.
- Wallenia ekmanii Urb.
- Wallenia elliptica Urb.
- Wallenia erythrocarpa Urb.
- Wallenia fawcettii Mez
- Wallenia formonensis Judd
- Wallenia gracilis Alain
- Wallenia hughsonii Alain
- Wallenia ilicifolia Urb. & Ekman
- Wallenia jacquinioides (Griseb.) Mez
- Wallenia lamarckiana (A.DC.) Mez
- Wallenia laurifolia Sw.
- Wallenia lepperi Panfet & Ventosa
- Wallenia maestrensis Panfet & Ventosa
- Wallenia punctulata Urb.
- Wallenia purdieana Mez
- Wallenia subverticillata (Britton) Ekman ex Urb.
- Wallenia sylvestris Urb.
- Wallenia urbaniana Mez
- Wallenia venosa Griseb.
- Wallenia xylosteoides (Griseb.) Mez
- Wallenia yunquensis (Urb.) Mez
