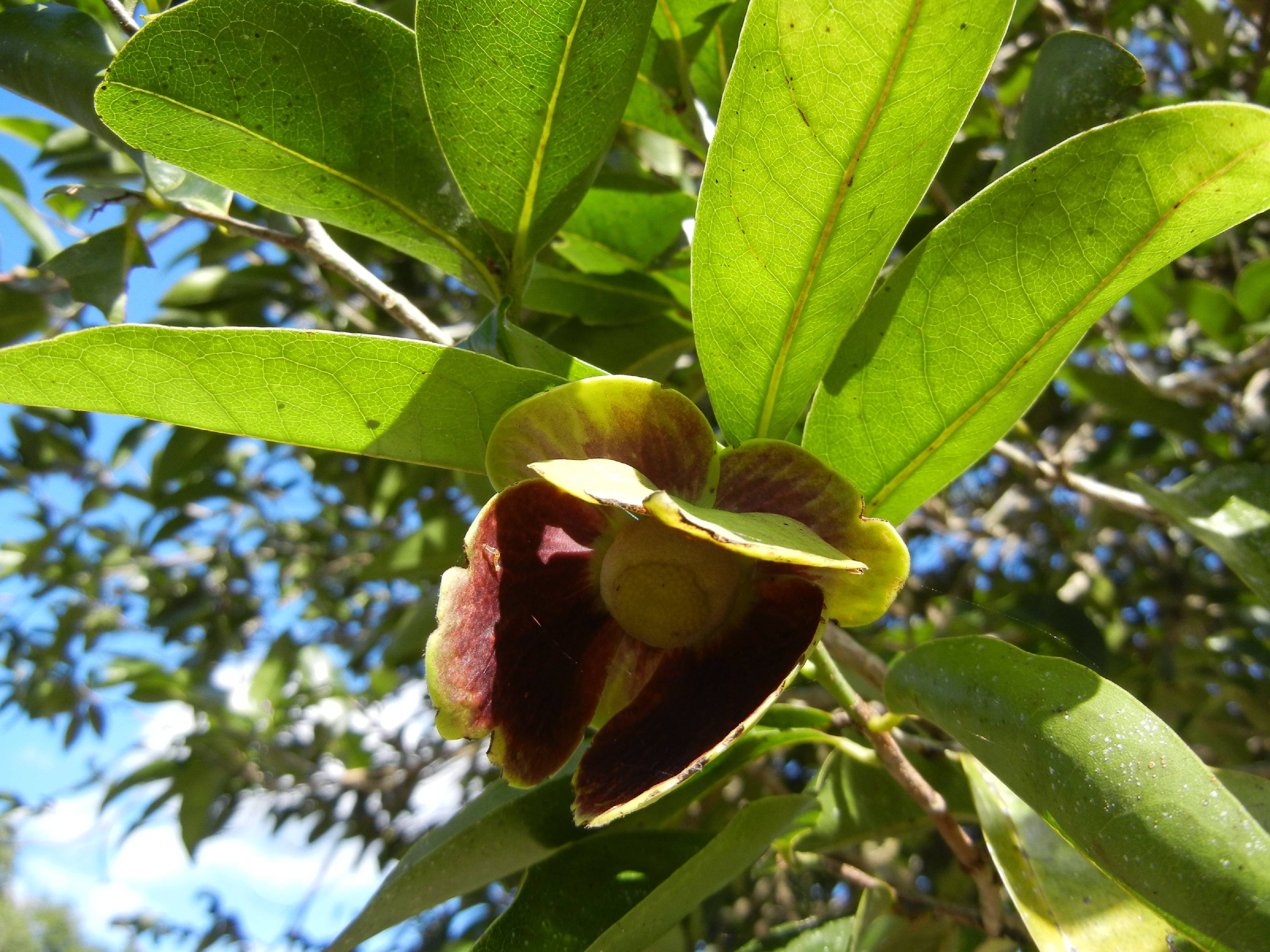
- Flower and leaves of Mosannona depressa in the Yucatán

Conservation status
- Least Concern (IUCN 3.1)

Scientific classification
- Kingdom: Plantae
- Clade: Tracheophytes
- Clade: Angiosperms
- Clade: Magnoliids
- Order: Magnoliales
- Family: Annonaceae
- Genus: Mosannona
- Species: M. depressa

Binomial name
- Mosannona depressa (Baill.) Chatrou

Synonyms
- Annona depressa Baill.; Duguetia leiophylla Donn.Sm.; Guatteria depressa (Baill.) Saff.; Guatteria gaumeri Greenm.; Guatteria leiophylla (Donn.Sm.) Saff. ex Standl.; Malmea depressa (Baill.) R.E.Fr.; Malmea gaumeri (Greenm.) Lundell; Malmea leiophylla (Donn.Sm.) Lundell

= Mosannona depressa =

Species of tree

Mosannona depressa is an evergreen tree within the Annonaceae family native to tropical southern Mexico, Belize, Guatemala, and Honduras.

English common names include lancewood and wild soursop. Spanish common names include elemuy and yumel.

== Description ==
A mature tree is generally 6–10 m (20–33 ft) tall.

== Chemistry ==
The bark contains significant amounts of alpha-asarone, but not its carcinogenic isomer beta-asarone, and other related trans-Propenylbenzene compounds.

== Medicinal Use ==
The bark of this tree is used by many people where it is native as medicine for gall stones. The root, cooked with corn silk, was reported used to treat gonorrhea and kidney and bladder problems.

Some more modern studies suggest this herb might have cholesterol-lowering properties.

== Toxicology ==
Extremely high doses (60 mg/kg) of pure alpha-asarone extracted from lancewood caused significant maternal harm when fed to pregnant mice. At doses of 15, 30 and 60 mg/kg, this compound was lethal to embryos and teratogenic. These concentrations are far beyond what can be achieved using the plant as medicine and therefore has no bearing on whether or not it would cause problems in pregnancy.
