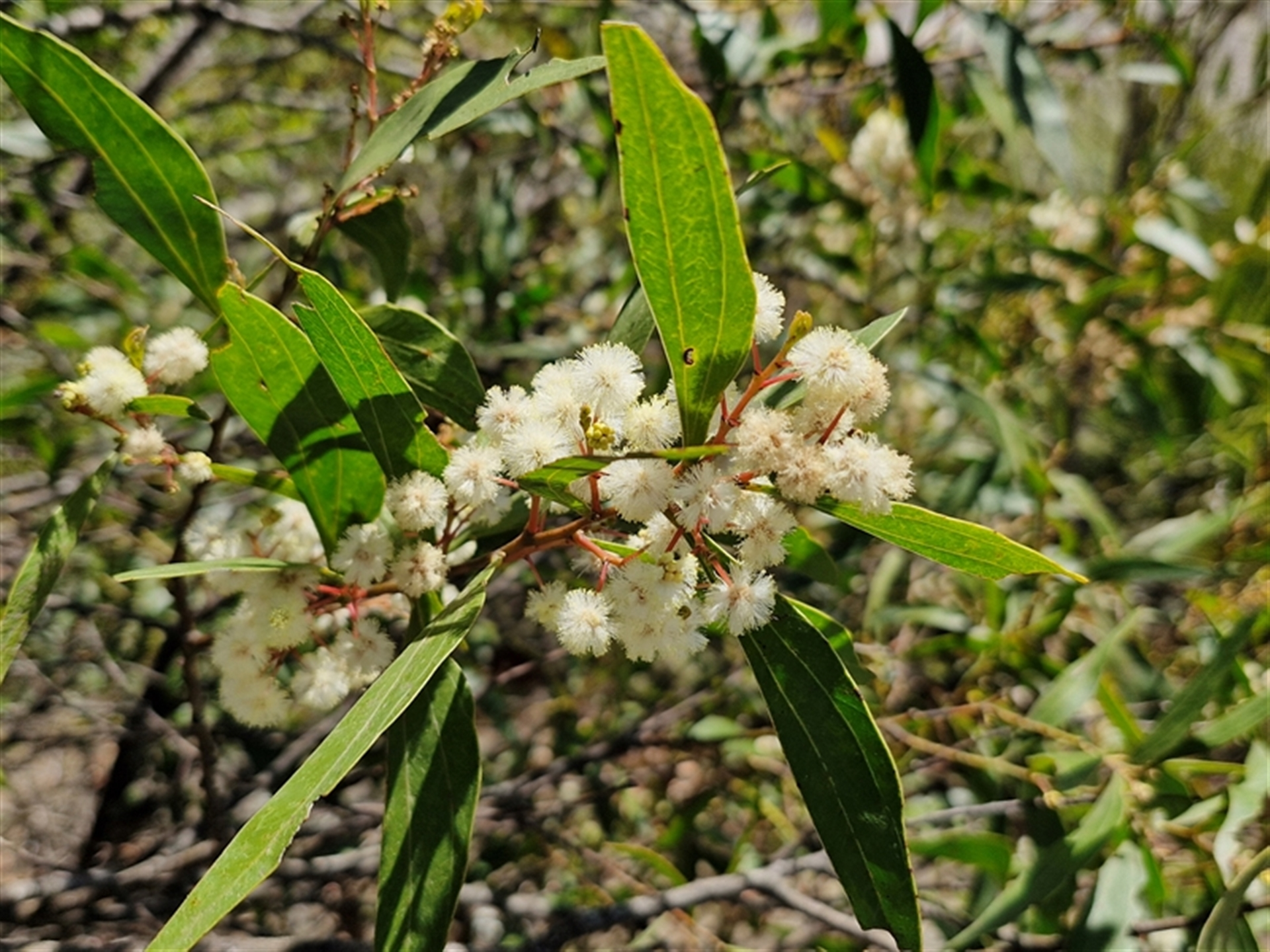
- Near Carrington Falls in Budderoo N.P.

Scientific classification
- Kingdom: Plantae
- Clade: Tracheophytes
- Clade: Angiosperms
- Clade: Eudicots
- Clade: Rosids
- Order: Fabales
- Family: Fabaceae
- Subfamily: Caesalpinioideae
- Clade: Mimosoid clade
- Genus: Acacia
- Species: A. binervata

Binomial name
- Acacia binervata DC.
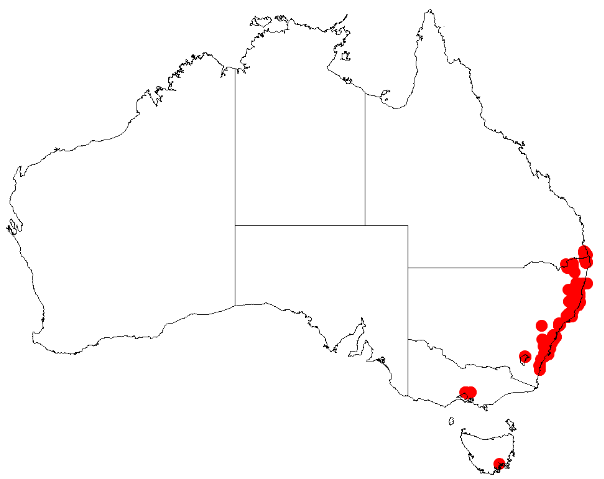
- Occurrence data from AVH

Synonyms
- Acacia umbrosa A.Cunn. ex Loudon nom. inval., nom. nud.; Acacia umbrosa A.Cunn. ex G.Don; Racosperma binervatum (DC.) Pedley

= Acacia binervata =

Two-veined hickory

Species of shrub

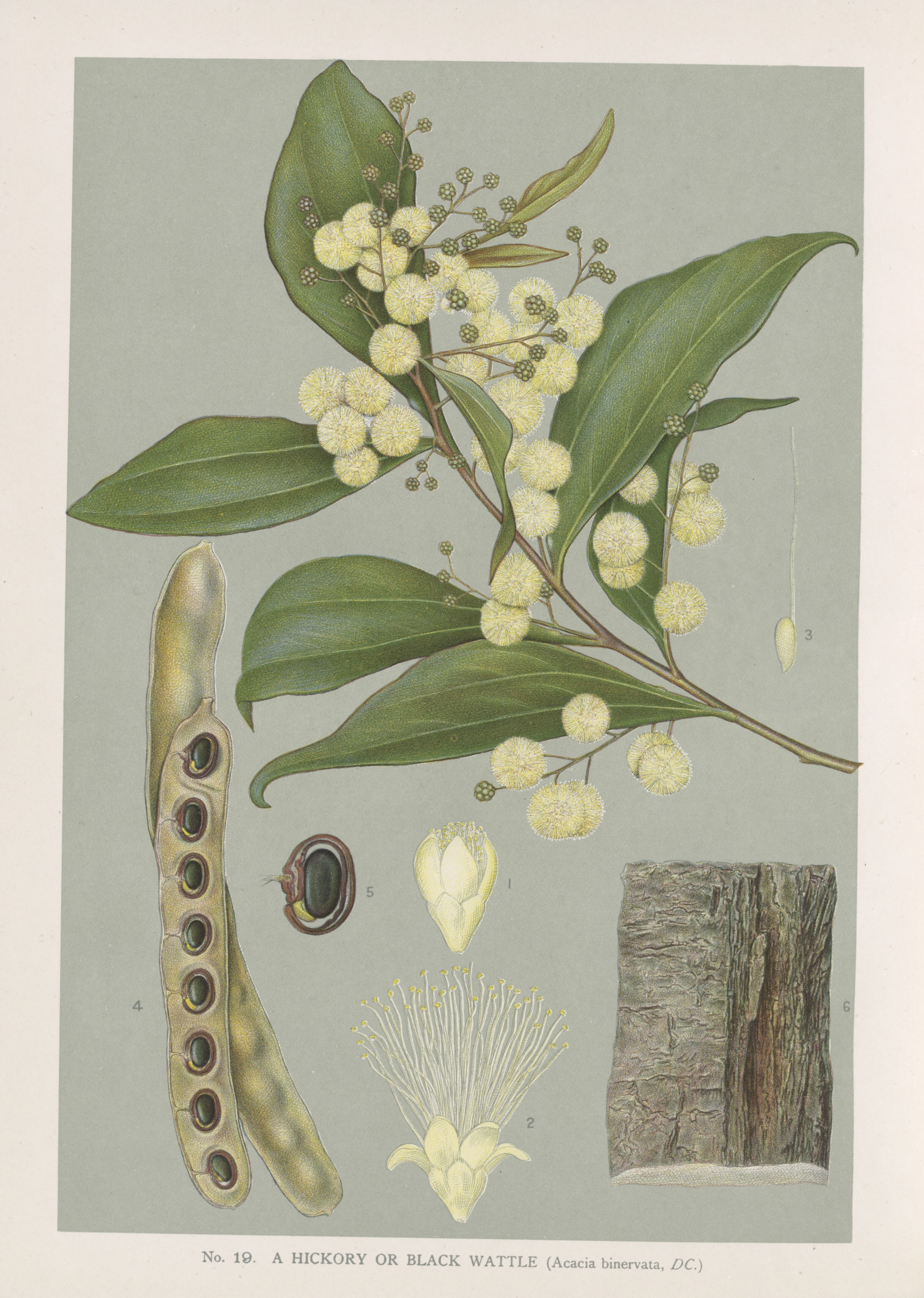
Illustration by Edward Minchen in Maiden's book The Flowering Plants and Ferns of New South Wales (1896)

Acacia binervata, commonly known as two-veined hickory, is a species of flowering plant in the family Fabaceae and is endemic to eastern Australia. It is a bushy shrub or tree, with narrowly egg-shaped to narrowly elliptic phyllodes, creamy yellow flowers arranged in spherical heads in 15 to 25 racemes, and glabrous, thinly crust-like to leathery pods up to 140 mm (5.5 in) long.

== Description ==
Acacia binervata is bushy shrub that typically reaches 5 m (16 ft) in height or a small tree to 15 m (49 ft), with grey-black or grey-brown bark and glabrous branchlets. Its phyllodes are glabrous, narrowly egg-shaped to narrowly elliptic 60–160 mm (2.4–6.3 in) long and 10–30 mm (0.39–1.18 in) wide with two prominent veins on each side and a gland 10–25 mm (0.39–0.98 in) above the base of the phyllodes. The flowers are borne in seven to twelve spherical heads on a raceme 30–60 mm (1.2–2.4 in) long, each head on a pedicel 6–12 mm (0.24–0.47 in) long with 15 to 25 pale yellow to more or less white flowers. Flowering occurs between August and November and the pods are thinly crust-like to leathery, 35–140 mm (1.4–5.5 in) long and 9–12 mm (0.35–0.47 in) wide with oblong to elliptic seeds about 5 mm (0.2 in) long with a black, thread-like stalk and a club-shaped aril.

== Taxonomy ==
Acacia binervata was first formally described in 1825 by the botanist Augustin Pyramus de Candolle in his Prodromus Systematis Naturalis Regni Vegetabilis. The specific epithet (binervata) means 'two-nerved', referring to the 2 main veins on the phyllodes, although there are often thee to five more or less prominent veins.

== Distribution ==
Two-veined hickory is found along the east coast of Australia from south east Queensland through much of New South Wales. It is found from around Narooma in southern New South Wales to around Mittagong in the west up to around the Mount Tambourine area in southern Queensland. It grows on moist sites in sandy or basaltic soils as a part of tall sclerophyll forest or on the margins of rainforest communities.

== Use in horticulture ==
The plant can be grown from seed, though the seed must be scarified prior to planting. It is a hardy and fast growing plant that copes well in damp areas and prefers full sun or part shade positions. It is a dense shade tree or shelter tree or hedge that is frost hardy.

The fungal pathogen Sarcostroma acaciae is found on various species of Acacia including A. binervata in Australia, and causes leaf spots.

== See also ==
- List of Acacia species
