= Acacia rothii =

Tooroo

Scientific classification
- Kingdom: Plantae
- Clade: Tracheophytes
- Clade: Angiosperms
- Clade: Eudicots
- Clade: Rosids
- Order: Fabales
- Family: Fabaceae
- Subfamily: Caesalpinioideae
- Clade: Mimosoid clade
- Genus: Acacia
- Species: A. rothii

Binomial name
- Acacia rothii F.M.Bailey
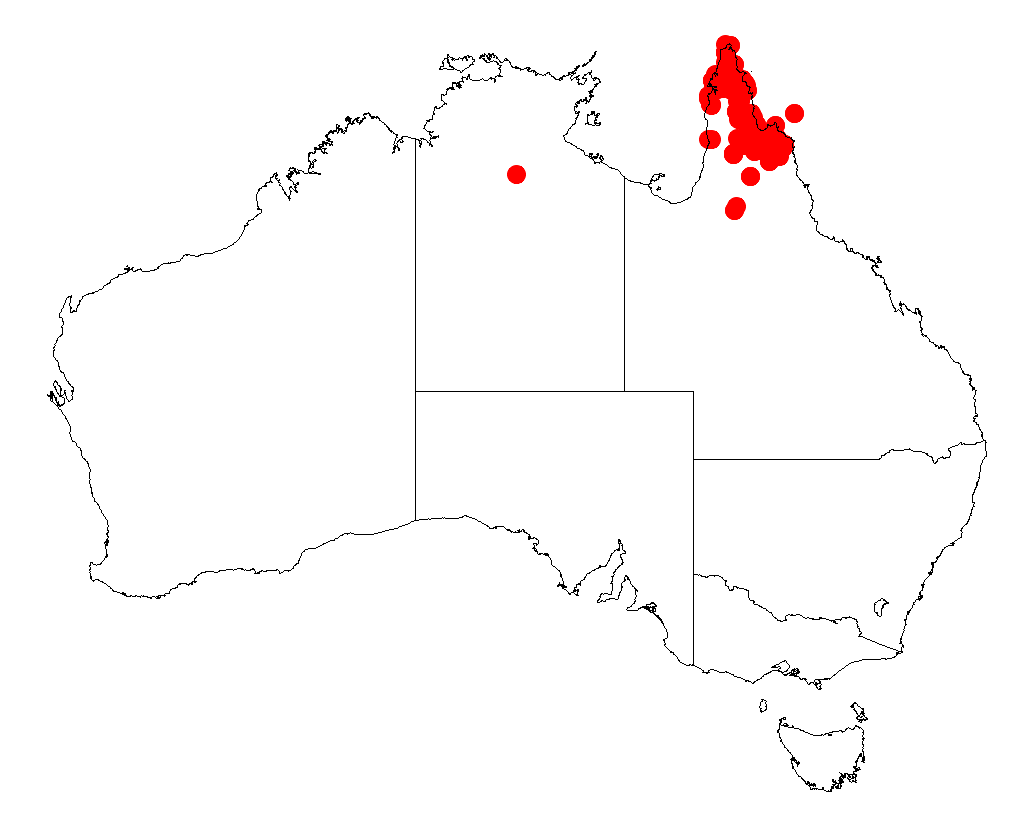
- Occurrence data from AVH

Species of legume

Acacia rothii, commonly known as tooroo, Roth's wattle, lancewood and spoon tree, is a shrub of the genus Acacia and the subgenus Plurinerves that is endemic to an area in north eastern Australia.

== Description ==
The tree typically grows to a height of 6 to 12 m (20 to 39 ft) with an open canopy and a reasonable straight trunk. It has rough dark grey-brown coloured bark and angular glabrous branchlets. Like most species of Acacia it has phyllodes rather than true leaves. The glabrous and evergreen phyllodes have a narrowly oblong-elliptic sickle shape with a length of 15 to 30 cm (5.9 to 11.8 in) and a width of 1.5 to 3.5 cm (0.59 to 1.38 in) and have two or three prominent longitudinal nerves.

== Taxonomy ==
The species was first formally described by the botanist Frederick Manson Bailey in 1900 as a part of the work Contributions to the Flora of Queensland as published in the Queensland Agricultural Journal. In 1987 it was reclassified as Racosperma rothii by Leslie Pedley then transferred back to genus Acacia in 2001. It is closely related to and closely resembles Acacia mimula and is thought to be closely related to Acacia bakeri.

== Distribution ==
The range of the plant is mostly in far north Queensland where it is commonly situated on almost level and gently undulating plains as well as low hills with elevations up to 800 m (2,600 ft). It is usually found growing in lateritic red earth sandy or loamy soils as a part of Eucalyptus woodland communities. The range of the plant extends from the northern tip of the Cape York Peninsula down to the Palmer River in the south.

== See also ==
- List of Acacia species
