= Oxandra lanceolata =

Lancewood

Conservation status
- Least Concern (IUCN 3.1)

Scientific classification
- Kingdom: Plantae
- Clade: Tracheophytes
- Clade: Angiosperms
- Clade: Magnoliids
- Order: Magnoliales
- Family: Annonaceae
- Genus: Oxandra
- Species: O. lanceolata

Binomial name
- Oxandra lanceolata (Sw.) Baill.

Synonyms
- Bocagea virgata Benth. & Hook.f.; Cananga lancea Poit. ex Dunal; Guatteria virgata Dunal; Oxandra virgata A.Rich.; Uvaria lanceolata Sw.; Uvaria virgata Sw.; Oxandra lanceolata subsp. macrocarpa R.E.Fr.

Species of plant

Oxandra lanceolata, also known as lancewood in English and chilcahuite in Spanish, is a species of plant in the Annonaceae family. It occurs naturally in Mexico, Cuba, Jamaica, Haiti, the Dominican Republic and Puerto Rico.

It is an evergreen tree growing up to 15 metres high. Its leaves are 3.5–9.5 cm long, 1.5–4 cm wide and elliptic, lanceolate or oblanceolate in shape, with a rounded base and a sharp tip to the leaf blade. The petiole is bare and grows up to 1–2 mm in length. Its compound fruit are ellipsoidal in shape, reddish-black in colour, 11–13 mm long and 7–9 mm wide. Its wood is used as a raw material, such as from October 1886 onwards for truncheons of the London Metropolitan Police.
