= Oxandra =

Scientific classification
- Kingdom: Plantae
- Clade: Tracheophytes
- Clade: Angiosperms
- Clade: Magnoliids
- Order: Magnoliales
- Family: Annonaceae
- Tribe: Malmeeae
- Genus: Oxandra; A.Rich.

Type species
- Oxandra virgata A.Rich.

Genus of flowering plants

Oxandra is a genus of flowering plants in the custard apple family Annonaceae, native to Mexico and tropical America.

== Species ==
As of January 2025, Plants of the World Online accepts the following 28 species:

- Oxandra aberrans Maas & Junikka
- Oxandra asbeckii (Pulle) R.E.Fr.
- Oxandra bolivarensis Maas & Junikka
- Oxandra espintana (Spruce ex Benth.) Baill.
- Oxandra euneura Diels
- Oxandra guianensis R.E.Fr.
- Oxandra krukoffii R.E.Fr.
- Oxandra lanceolata (Sw.) Baill.
- Oxandra laurifolia (Sw.) A.Rich.
- Oxandra leucodermis (Spruce ex Benth.) Warm.
- Oxandra longipetala R.E.Fr.
- Oxandra macrophylla R.E.Fr.
- Oxandra martiana (Schltdl.) R.E.Fr.
- Oxandra maya Miranda
- Oxandra mediocris Diels
- Oxandra oblongifolia R.E.Fr.
- Oxandra panamensis R.E.Fr.
- Oxandra polyantha R.E.Fr.
- Oxandra reticulata Maas
- Oxandra rheophytica Maas & Junikka
- Oxandra riedeliana R.E.Fr.
- Oxandra saxicola Maas & Junikka
- Oxandra sessiliflora R.E.Fr.
- Oxandra sphaerocarpa R.E.Fr.
- Oxandra surinamensis Jans.-Jac.
- Oxandra unibracteata J.C.Lopes, Junikka & Mello-Silva
- Oxandra venezuelana R.E.Fr.
- Oxandra xylopioides Diels
