= Galumna pseudokhoii =

Scientific classification
- Domain: Eukaryota
- Kingdom: Animalia
- Phylum: Arthropoda
- Subphylum: Chelicerata
- Class: Arachnida
- Order: Oribatida
- Family: Galumnidae
- Genus: Galumna
- Species: G. pseudokhoii

Binomial name
- Galumna pseudokhoii Ermilov et Anichkin, 2011

Species of mite

Galumna pseudokhoii is a species of mite first found in Cát Tiên National Park, Vietnam, in dark loam in a Lagerstroemia forest. This species is very similar in the location and morphology of notogastral areae porosae, rostral morphology, lamellar and interlamellar setae, lamellar lines locations, and incomplete dorsosejugal suture to Galumna khoii, differing in body size, sensilli morphology, and the number of genital setae on the anterior parts of its genital plates.
