= Pergalumna indistincta =

Scientific classification
- Kingdom: Animalia
- Phylum: Arthropoda
- Subphylum: Chelicerata
- Class: Arachnida
- Order: Oribatida
- Family: Galumnidae
- Genus: Pergalumna
- Species: P. indistincta

Binomial name
- Pergalumna indistincta Ermilov et Anichkin, 2011

Species of mite

Pergalumna indistincta is a species of mite first found in Cát Tiên National Park, Vietnam, in dark loam in a Lagerstroemia forest.
