= Lagerstroemia lanceolata =

Lagerstroemia lanceolata can refer to:

- Lagerstroemia lanceolata Wall. ex C.B.Clarke, a synonym of Lagerstroemia microcarpa Wight
- Lagerstroemia lanceolata Wight & Arn., a synonym of Lagerstroemia parviflora Roxb.
