= Galumna acutirostrum =

Scientific classification
- Kingdom: Animalia
- Phylum: Arthropoda
- Subphylum: Chelicerata
- Class: Arachnida
- Order: Oribatida
- Family: Galumnidae
- Genus: Galumna
- Species: G. acutirostrum

Binomial name
- Galumna acutirostrum Ermilov & Anichkin, 2010

Species of mite

Galumna acutirostrum is a species of mite of the Galumna genus.

== Taxonomy ==
Specimens of G. acutirostrum were first gathered from sandy soil in a dipterocarp forest of Cát Tiên National Park in 2009. In 2010, the species was diagnosed as its own separate species in a study by Russian scientists Sergey Ermilov and Alexander Anichkin from the University of Tyumen and the Russian Academy of Sciences respectively.

== Description ==
G. acutirostrum is a rotund oribatid mite of the Galumna genus. The species is distinguished from other members of its genus by the size of its body, the shape of its head and its setae; and its pointed rostrum, a feature from which its name is derived. Like all Galumna mites, the body is segmented and divided into several main divisions; the thorax, the gnathosoma, and both anogenital and epimeral regions near the rear of the body. The entire body is smooth, and brown to dark brown in coloration. The gnathosoma is characterized primarily by the presence of the distinct rostrum, but is also distinct for its long, brush-like and slightly barbed setae present near the mouth area. The sensilli, which is present below the teeth of the species, is somewhat fusiform. The head is indistinguishable from the rest of the body. In the anogenital region, the mite has two pairs of anal setae, which are very small. The genital plate is thin, and slightly barbed. The teeth, present in the chelicera, are blunt and only slightly mobile.

G. acutirostrum varies in length from 747 to 846μm, and in width from 630 to 680μm.

The particular combination of traits present in G. acutirostum is rare. The only other species to have similar morphology is Galumna grandjeani, a species from Central Africa. Some traits are shared by Galumna Valida, a species from Micronesia; and Galumna kebangica, a species from Vietnam.

== Distribution ==
G. acutirostrum has a generalized Southeast Asian distribution. Initial studies of the species observed its distribution limited to the rainforests of southern Vietnam. Later studies found specimens of the species living in China, specifically in the forested regions of Macao. Thailand is also home to the species. The area surrounding the Xwê Nuo river in New Caledonia is also home to the species, and is the only known habitat of the mite in Oceania.
