= Galumna levisensilla =

Scientific classification
- Domain: Eukaryota
- Kingdom: Animalia
- Phylum: Arthropoda
- Subphylum: Chelicerata
- Class: Arachnida
- Order: Oribatida
- Family: Galumnidae
- Genus: Galumna
- Species: G. levisensilla

Binomial name
- Galumna levisensilla Ermilov & Anichkin, 2010

Species of mite

Galumna levisensilla is a species of mite first found in sandy soil in a dipterocarp forest of Cát Tiên National Park.
