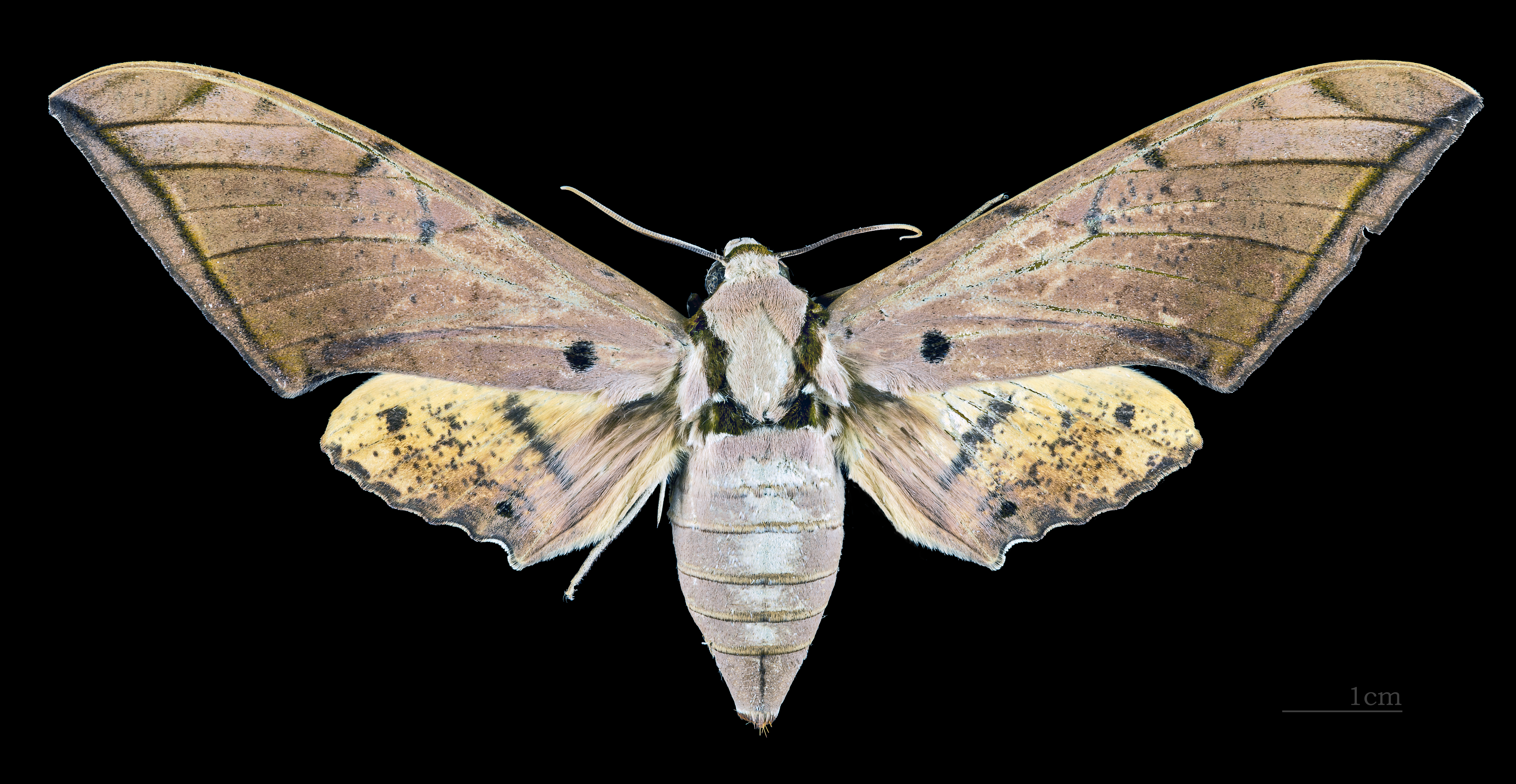
- Female, dorsal view
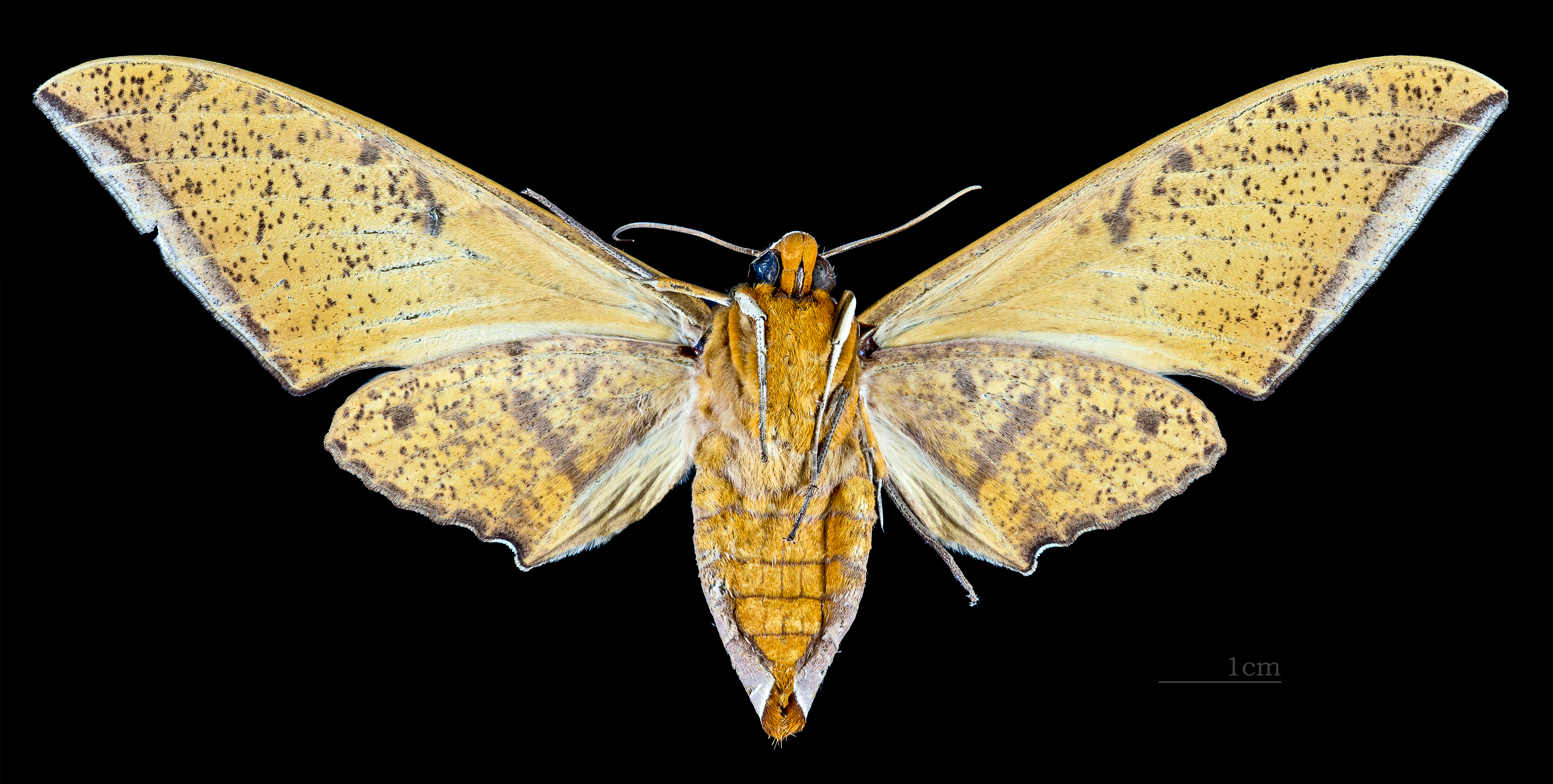
- Female, ventral view

Scientific classification
- Kingdom: Animalia
- Phylum: Arthropoda
- Class: Insecta
- Order: Lepidoptera
- Family: Sphingidae
- Genus: Ambulyx
- Species: A. clavata

Binomial name
- Ambulyx clavata (Jordan, 1929)

Synonyms
- Oxyambulyx clavata Jordan, 1929

= Ambulyx clavata =

Species of moth

Ambulyx clavata is a species of moth of the family Sphingidae first described by Karl Jordan in 1929.

== Distribution ==
It is known to come from Sundaland and Thailand.

== Gallery ==
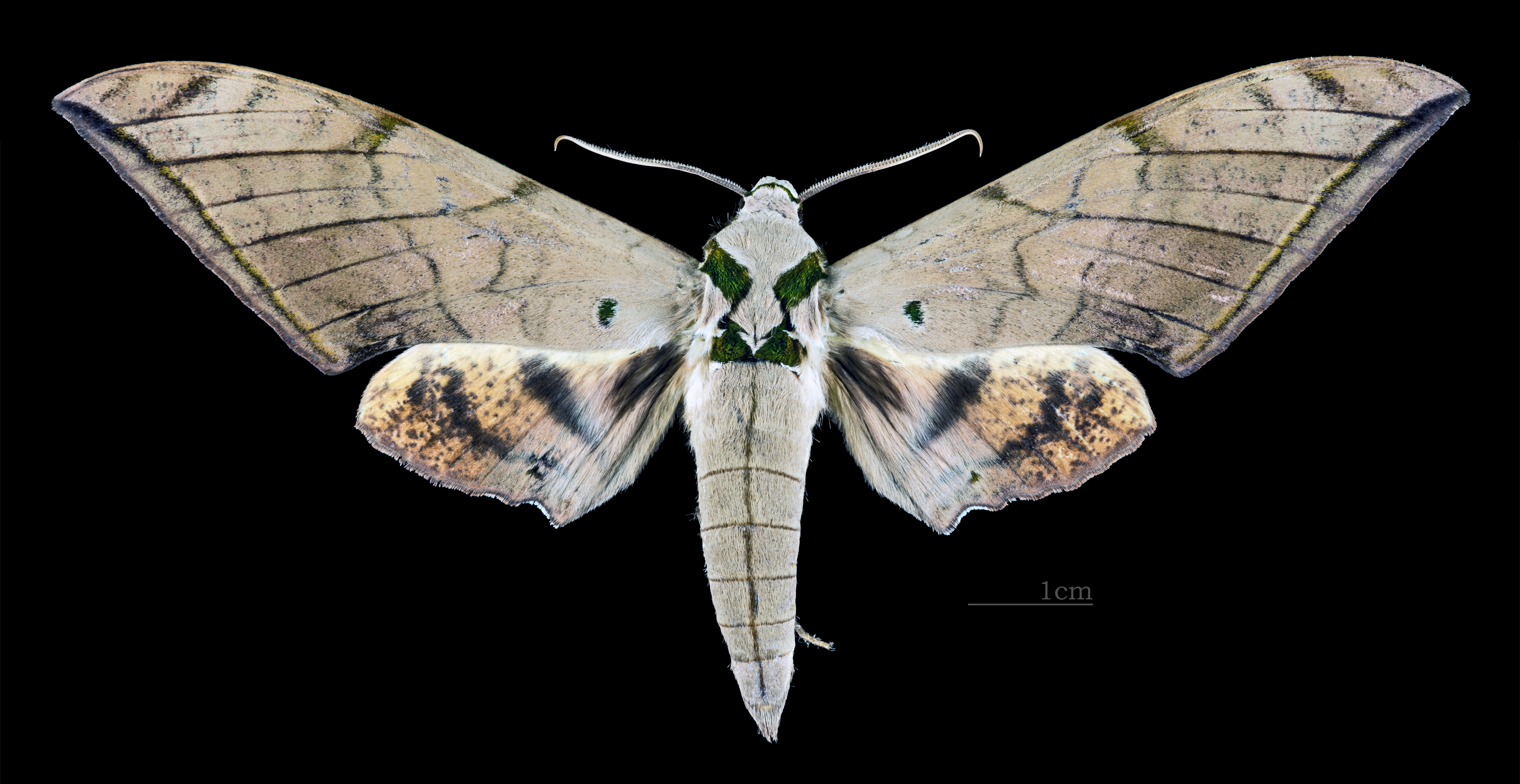
Male, dorsal view

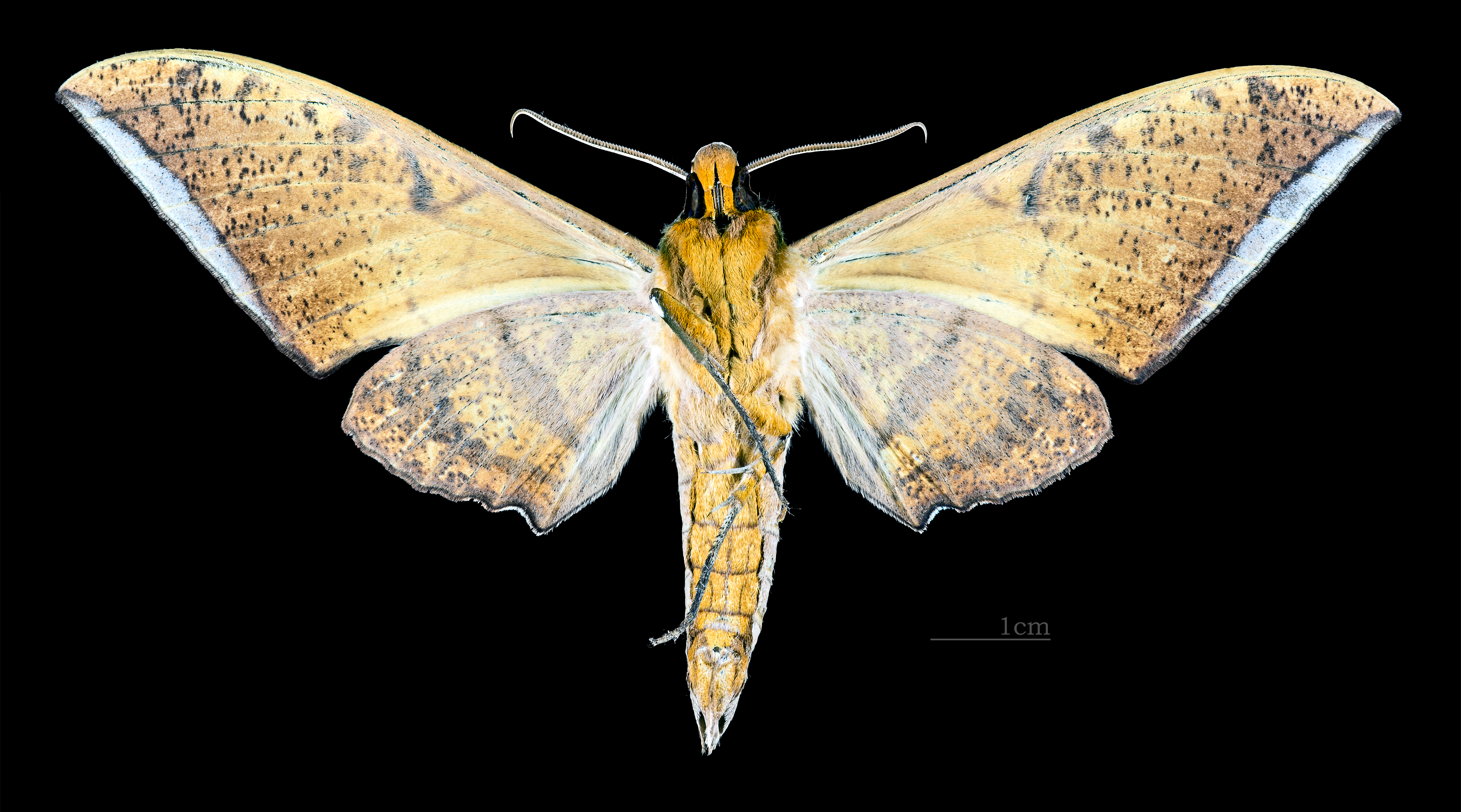
Male, ventral view

== Biology ==
The larvae have been recorded feeding on Lagerstroemia species.
