= Lagerstroemia floribunda var. floribunda =

Conservation status
- Vulnerable (IUCN 2.3)

Scientific classification
- Kingdom: Plantae
- Clade: Tracheophytes
- Clade: Angiosperms
- Clade: Eudicots
- Clade: Rosids
- Order: Myrtales
- Family: Lythraceae
- Genus: Lagerstroemia
- Species: L. floribunda
- Variety: L. f. var. floribunda

Trinomial name
- Lagerstroemia floribunda var. floribunda

Synonyms
- L. anisoptera Koehne

Variety of tree

Lagerstroemia floribunda var. floribunda is a variety of plant in the family Lythraceae. It is a tree found in Indochina, especially Peninsular Malaysia. It is threatened by habitat loss.
