= Neogalumna seniczaki =

Scientific classification
- Kingdom: Animalia
- Phylum: Arthropoda
- Subphylum: Chelicerata
- Class: Arachnida
- Order: Oribatida
- Family: Galumnidae
- Genus: Neogalumna
- Species: N. seniczaki

Binomial name
- Neogalumna seniczaki Ermilov & Anichkin, 2010

Species of mite

Neogalumna seniczaki is a species of mite first found in sandy soil in a dipterocarp forest of Cát Tiên National Park.
