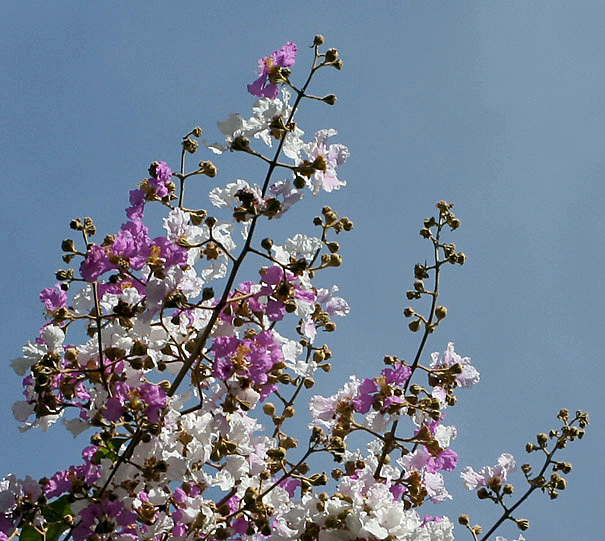
- Flowers close-up in Kolkata

Scientific classification
- Kingdom: Plantae
- Clade: Tracheophytes
- Clade: Angiosperms
- Clade: Eudicots
- Clade: Rosids
- Order: Myrtales
- Family: Lythraceae
- Genus: Lagerstroemia
- Species: L. floribunda

Binomial name
- Lagerstroemia floribunda Jack 1820

Synonyms
- Murtughas floribunda (Jack) Kuntze

= Lagerstroemia floribunda =

Species of flowering plant

Lagerstroemia floribunda, also known as Thai crape myrtle and kedah bungor, is a species of flowering plant in the family Lythraceae. It is native of the tropical region of Southeast Asia.

In Thailand, it is the provincial tree of Saraburi Province.

== Varieties ==
Plants of the World Online includes:

1. Lagerstroemia floribunda var. cuspidata Wall. ex C.B.Clarke
2. Lagerstroemia floribunda var. floribunda
3. Lagerstroemia floribunda var. sublaevis Craib

== Gallery ==
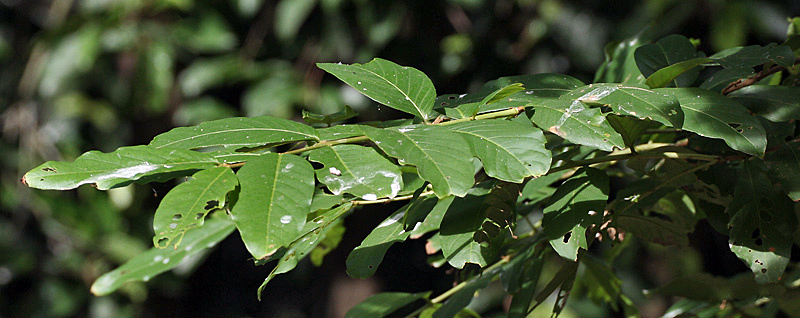
Leaves in Kolkata, West Bengal, India

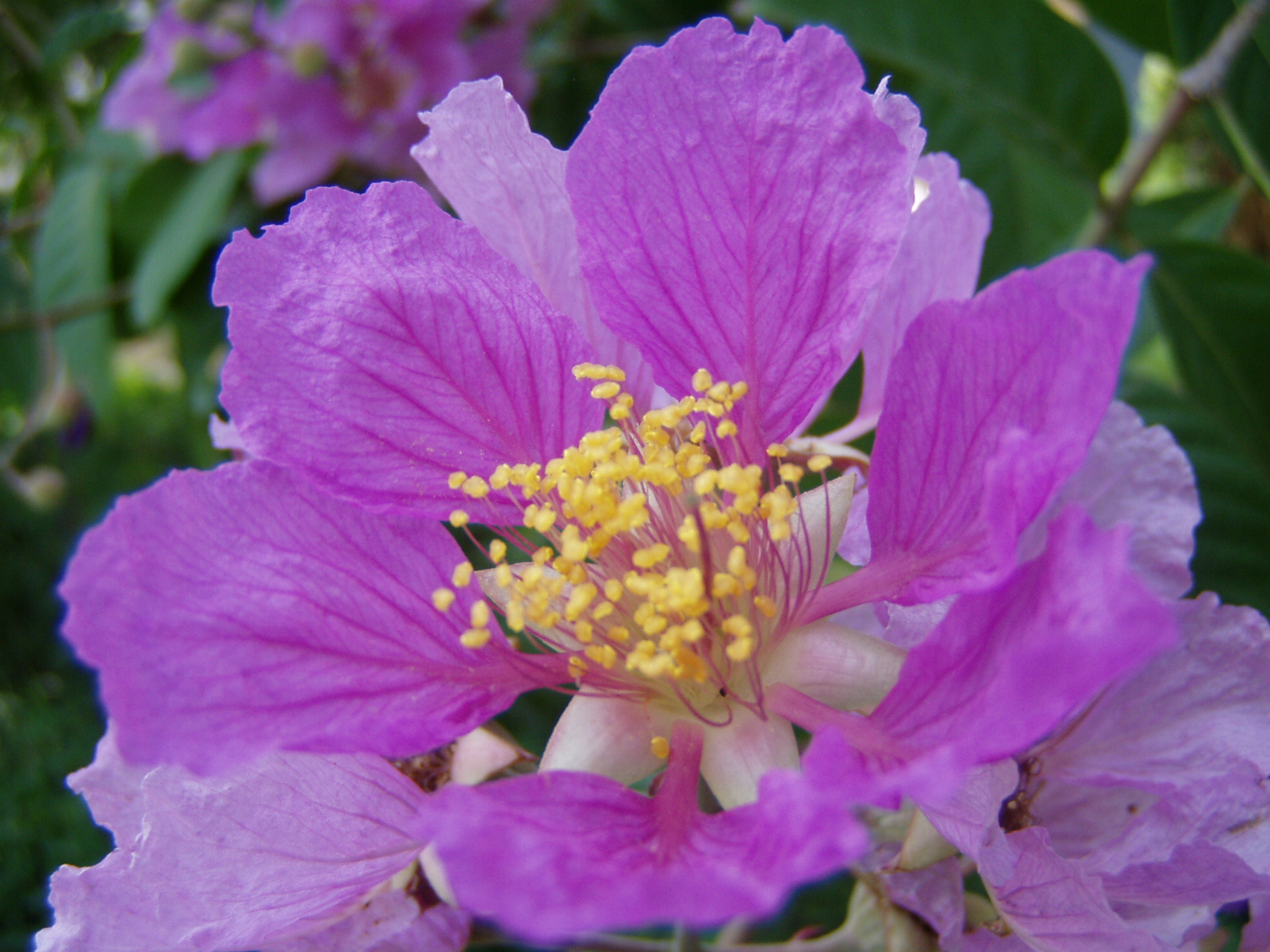
Flower close-up in Ranchi, Jharkhand, India

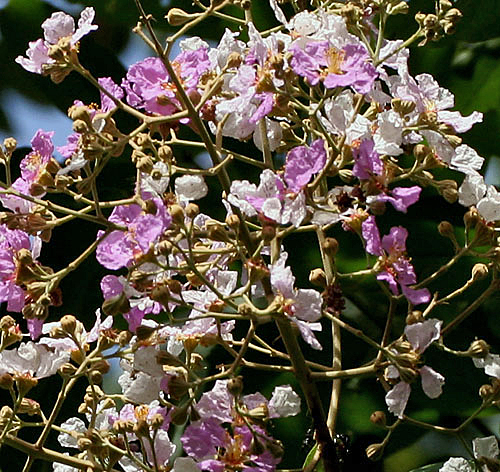
Flowers close-up in Kolkata

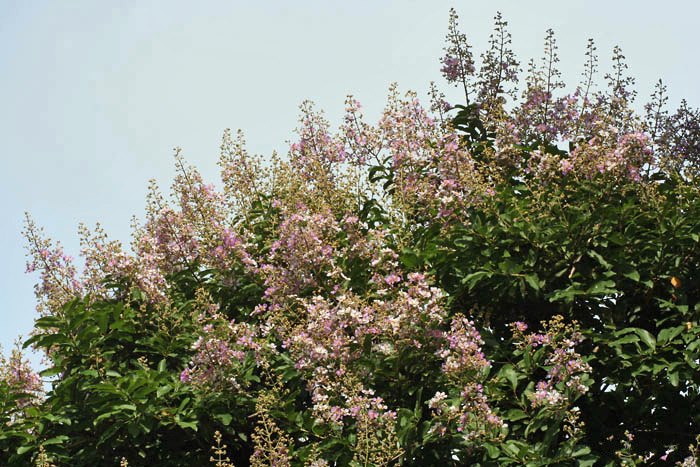
Flowers at canopy in Kolkata

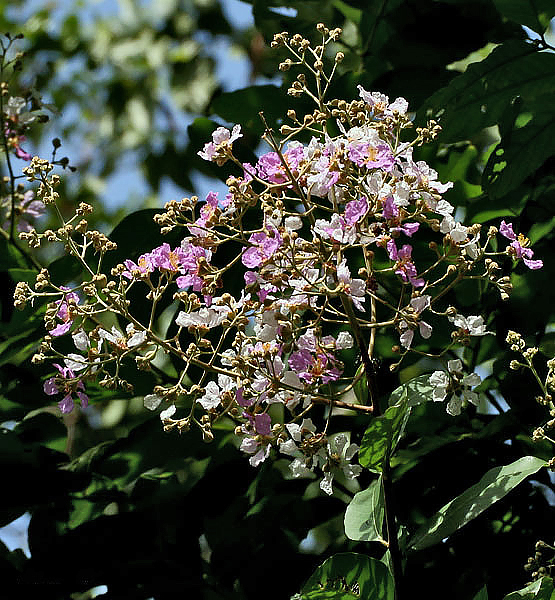
Flower spike in Kolkata

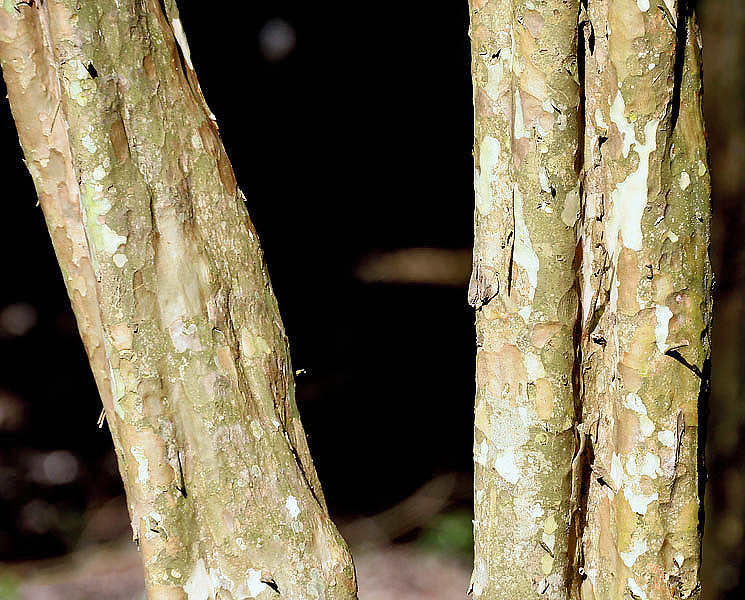
Bark in Kolkata
