= Pergalumna =

Scientific classification
- Kingdom: Animalia
- Phylum: Arthropoda
- Subphylum: Chelicerata
- Class: Arachnida
- Order: Oribatida
- Family: Galumnidae
- Genus: Pergalumna; Grandjean (1936)

Genus of arachnids

Pergalumna is a genus of the family Galumnidae. The species are mites first described by Francois Grandjean in 1936. There are about 200 species of Pergalumna.

== Species ==
- Pergalumna amatholensis
- Pergalumna amorpha
- Pergalumna aquatica
- Pergalumna bicristata
- Pergalumna boliviana
- Pergalumna capualensis
- Pergalumna cubaensis
- Pergalumna dactylaris
- Pergalumna ekaterinae
- Pergalumna grebennikovi
- Pergalumna hugocoetzeeae
- Pergalumna hypergranulosa
- Pergalumna indistincta
- Pergalumna infinita
- Pergalumna janosbaloghi
- Pergalumna jenoi
- Pergalumna krisperi
- Pergalumna lenticulata
- Pergalumna obsidiana
- Pergalumna paraindistincta
- Pergalumna parapassimpunctata
- Pergalumna pietertheroni
- Pergalumna reniformis
- Pergalumna sidorchukae
- Pergalumna silvestris
- Pergalumna tuberclesejugalis
