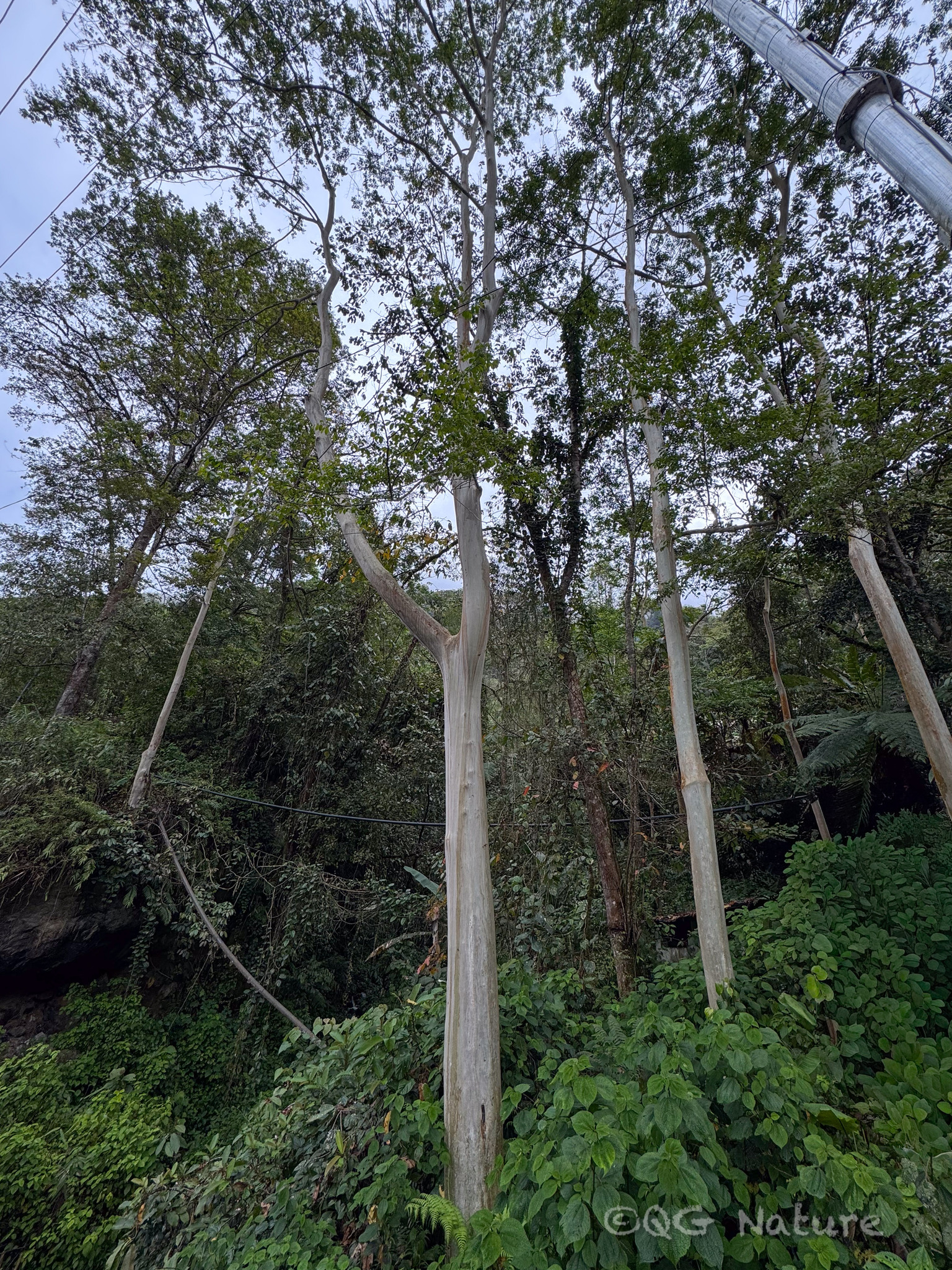

Conservation status
- Endangered (IUCN 2.3)

Scientific classification
- Kingdom: Plantae
- Clade: Embryophytes
- Clade: Tracheophytes
- Clade: Spermatophytes
- Clade: Angiosperms
- Clade: Eudicots
- Clade: Rosids
- Order: Myrtales
- Family: Lythraceae
- Genus: Lagerstroemia
- Species: L. minuticarpa

Binomial name
- Lagerstroemia minuticarpa Debberm. ex P.C. Kanjilal

= Lagerstroemia minuticarpa =

Species of flowering plant

Lagerstroemia minuticarpa is a species of flowering plant in the family Lythraceae. It grows as a tree and is endemic to Assam and Sikkim in north-eastern India.
