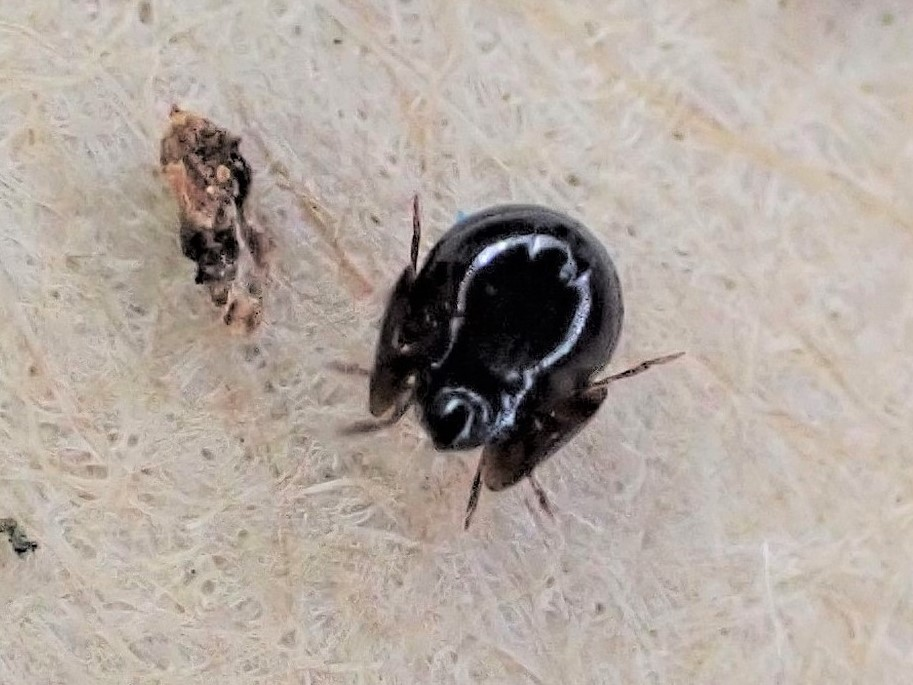
- Galumna sp.

Scientific classification
- Domain: Eukaryota
- Kingdom: Animalia
- Phylum: Arthropoda
- Subphylum: Chelicerata
- Class: Arachnida
- Order: Oribatida
- Family: Galumnidae
- Genus: Galumna; Heyden, 1826

Species
- See text

= Galumna =

Genus of mites

Galumna is a genus of mites in the family Galumnidae.

== Species ==
Over 160 species are accepted within Galumna. A small number are organized under subgenera.

- Galumna aba Mahunka, 1989
- Galumna acutirostrum Ermilov & Anichkin, 2010
- Galumna aegyptica Abdel-Hamid, Al-Assiuty & Trrad, 1982
- Galumna agueroi P. Balogh, 1997
- Galumna alata (Hermann, 1804)
- Galumna ambigua Wallwork, 1977
- Galumna angularis Jeleva, Scull & Cruz, 1984
- Galumna ankaratra Mahunka, 1997
- Galumna antalata Banks, 1916
- Galumna appressala (Ewing, 1910)
- Galumna arabica Bayoumi & Al-Khalifa, 1984
- Galumna araujoi Pérez-Íñigo & Baggio, 1994
- Galumna armatifera Mahunka, 1996
- Galumna arrugata Jeleva, Scull & Cruz, 1984
- Galumna atomaria (Berlese, 1914)
- Galumna australis (Berlese, 1914)
- Galumna azoreana Pérez-Íñigo, 1992
- Galumna baloghi Wallwork, 1965
- Galumna banksi Jacot, 1929
- Galumna barnardi (Jacot, 1940)
- Galumna basilewskyi Balogh, 1962
- Galumna berlesei Oudemans, 1919
- Galumna betzaida Mahunka, 1992
- Galumna bimorpha Mahunka, 1987
- Galumna bradleyi (Jacot, 1935)
- Galumna brasiliensis Sellnick, 1923
- Galumna californica (Hall, 1911)
- Galumna calva Starý, 1997
- Galumna capensis Engelbrecht, 1969
- Galumna castanea (Canestrini, 1898)
- Galumna changchunensis Wen, 1987
- Galumna chujoi Aoki, 1966
- Galumna circularis Hammer, 1958
- Galumna cirripilis (Canestrini, 1898)
- Galumna coloradensis (Jacot, 1929)
- Galumna colossus Oudemans, 1915
- Galumna comparabilis Engelbrecht, 1972
- Galumna coreana Choi, 1986
- Galumna coronata Mahunka, 1992
- Galumna costata Mahunka, 1978
- Galumna crenata Deb & Raychaudhuri, 1975
- Galumna cubana Jeleva, Scull & Cruz, 1984
- Galumna cuneata Aoki, 1961
- Galumna delectum Pérez-Íñigo & Baggio, 1996
- Galumna difficilis (Berlese, 1916)
- Galumna dimidiata Engelbrecht, 1969
- Galumna dimorpha Krivolutskaja, 1952
- Galumna discifera Balogh, 1960
- Galumna dispar Willmann, 1931
- Galumna divergens Mahunka, 1995
- Galumna dorsalis (Koch, 1835)
- Galumna dubia Mihelcic, 1953
- Galumna egregia Sellnick, 1923
- Galumna elegantula (Jacot, 1935)
- Galumna elimata (Koch, 1841)
- Galumna engelbrechti Mahunka, 1997
- Galumna euaensis Hammer, 1973
- Galumna europaea (Berlese, 1914)
- Galumna exigua Sellnick, 1925
- Galumna fijiensis Hammer, 1973
- Galumna flabellifera Hammer, 1958
- Galumna flagellata Willmann, 1925
- Galumna floridae (Jacot, 1929)
- Galumna fordi (Jacot, 1934)
- Galumna fuscata Kishida, 1921
- Galumna gharbiensis Bayoumi, Al-Assiuty, Abdel-Hamid & El-Shereef, 1983
- Galumna gibbula Grandjean, 1956
- Galumna glabra Pérez-Íñigo & Baggio, 1991
- Galumna globuloides (Tafner, 1905)
- Galumna granalata Aoki, 1984
- Galumna grandjeani Balogh, 1962
- Galumna hammerae P. Balogh, 1985
- Galumna heros (Canestrini, 1897)
- Galumna hexagona Balogh, 1960
- Galumna homodactyla Karpelles, 1893)
- Galumna hudsoni Hammer, 1952
- Galumna humida (Hall, 1911)
- Galumna imperfecta Hammer, 1972
- Galumna incerta Pérez-Íñigo & Baggio, 1991
- Galumna incisa Mahunka, 1982
- Galumna innexa Pérez-Íñigo & Baggio, 1986
- Galumna iranensis Mahunka, 2001
- Galumna irazu P. Balogh, 1997
- Galumna iterata Subías, 2004
- Galumna ithacensis (Jacot, 1929)
- Galumna jacoti Wharton, 1938
- Galumna karajica Mahunka, 2001
- Galumna kazakhstani Krivolutskaja, 1952
- Galumna khoii Mahunka, 1989
- Galumna lanceata (Oudemans, 1900)
- Galumna laselvae P. Balogh, 1997
- Galumna lejeunei Starý, 2005
- Galumna levisensilla Ermilov & Anichkin, 2010
- Galumna longiclava Pérez-Íñigo & Baggio, 1991
- Galumna longiporosa Fujikawa, 1972
- Galumna louisianae (Jacot, 1929)
- Galumna lunaris Jeleva, Scull & Cruz, 1984
- Galumna lyrica (Jacot, 1935)
- Galumna macroptera (Ewing, 1909)
- Galumna major (Pearce, 1906)
- Galumna mariae Balogh, 1961
- Galumna mauritii Mahunka, 1978
- Galumna maxima (Berlese, 1916)
- Galumna media (Berlese, 1914)
- Galumna microfissum Hammer, 1968
- Galumna minuta (Ewing, 1909)
- Galumna mollis Kunst, 1958
- Galumna monteithi Balogh & Mahunka, 1978
- Galumna monticola Hammer, 1977
- Galumna mystax C. & C. jr., Pérez-Íñigo, 1993
- Galumna nigra (Ewing, 1909)
- Galumna nilgiria (Ewing, 1910)
- Galumna niliaca Al-Assiuty, Abdel-Hamid, Seif & El-Deeb, 1985
- Galumna nodula Nevin, 1974
- Galumna nonoensis P. Balogh, 1988
- Galumna nuda Engelbrecht, 1972
- Galumna obvia (Berlese, 1914)
- Galumna ovata (Berlese, 1916)
- Galumna pallida Hammer, 1958
- Galumna parascaber Deb & Raychaudhuri, 1975
- Galumna parva Woodring, 1965
- Galumna parviporosa J. & P. Balogh, 1983
- Galumna perezi Pérez-Íñigo & Baggio, 1994
- Galumna planiclava Hammer, 1973
- Galumna polyporus Mihelcic, 1952
- Galumna pseudokhoii Ermilov & Anichkin, 2011
- Galumna pusilla Sellnick, 1923
- Galumna reiterata Subías, 2004
- Galumna reticulata Hammer, 1958
- Galumna rossica Sellnick, 1926
- Galumna rostrata Sellnick, 1922
- Galumna rugosa Hammer, 1968
- Galumna sabahna Mahunka, 1995
- Galumna saboori Mahunka, 2001
- Galumna samoaensis Jacot, 1924
- Galumna scaber Hammer, 1968
- Galumna sequoiae (Jacot, 1929)
- Galumna setigera Mihelcic, 1956
- Galumna similis Pérez-Íñigo & Baggio, 1980
- Galumna sinuofrons Jacot, 1922
- Galumna strinovichi J. & P. Balogh, 1983
- Galumna swezeyi (Jacot, 1928)
- Galumna szentivanyorum J. & P. Balogh, 1983
- Galumna tarsipennata Oudemans, 1914
- Galumna tessellata (Ewing, 1910)
- Galumna texana Banks, 1906
- Galumna tokyoensis Aoki, 1966
- Galumna tricuspidata Engelbrecht, 1969
- Galumna triops Balogh, 1960
- Galumna triquetra Aoki, 1965
- Galumna tuberculata Mahunka, 1997
- Galumna unica Sellnick, 1923
- Galumna valida Aoki, 1994
- Galumna varia Mahunka, 1995
- Galumna virginiensis Jacot, 1929
- Galumna weni Aoki & Hu, 1993
- Galumna zachvatkini Grishina, 1982

=== Species under subgenera ===
Galumna (Angulogalumna) Grishina, 1981

- Galumna asiatica (Girshina, 1981)

Galumna (Cosmogalumna) Aoki, 1988

- Galumna hiroyoshii (Nakamura & Fujikawa, 2004)
- Galumna ornata (Aoki, 1988)
- Galumna praeoccupata Subías, 2004
- Galumna singularis (Mahunka, 1995)

Galumna (Erogalumna) Grandjean, 1964

- Galumna zeucta (Grandjean, 1964)

Galumna (Indogalumna) Balakrishnan, 1985

- Galumna microsulcata (Balakrishnan, 1985)
- Galumna monticola (Balakrishnan, 1985)
- Galumna neonominata Subías, 2004
- Galumna pterolineata Hammer, 1972
- Galumna rasilis Pérez-Íñigo, 1987
- Galumna undulata (Balakrishnan, 1985)

Galumna (Kabylogalumna) Bernini, 1984

- Galumna rhinoceros (Bernini, 1984)
