= Lagerstroemia macrocarpa =

Conservation status
- Least Concern (IUCN 3.1)

Scientific classification
- Kingdom: Plantae
- Clade: Embryophytes
- Clade: Tracheophytes
- Clade: Spermatophytes
- Clade: Angiosperms
- Clade: Eudicots
- Clade: Rosids
- Order: Myrtales
- Family: Lythraceae
- Genus: Lagerstroemia
- Species: L. macrocarpa

Binomial name
- Lagerstroemia macrocarpa Kurz

Synonyms
- Lagerstroemia costa-draconis Furtado & Montien; Lagerstroemia hossei Koehne; Lagerstroemia intermedia var. oblonga Craib; Lagerstroemia macrocarpa var. reflexa Furtado & Montien

Species of flowering plant

Lagerstroemia macrocarpa is a species of plant in the family Lythraceae. It is native to Bangladesh, Cambodia, Laos, Myanmar, Thailand and Vietnam. It has a conservation status of least concern.
