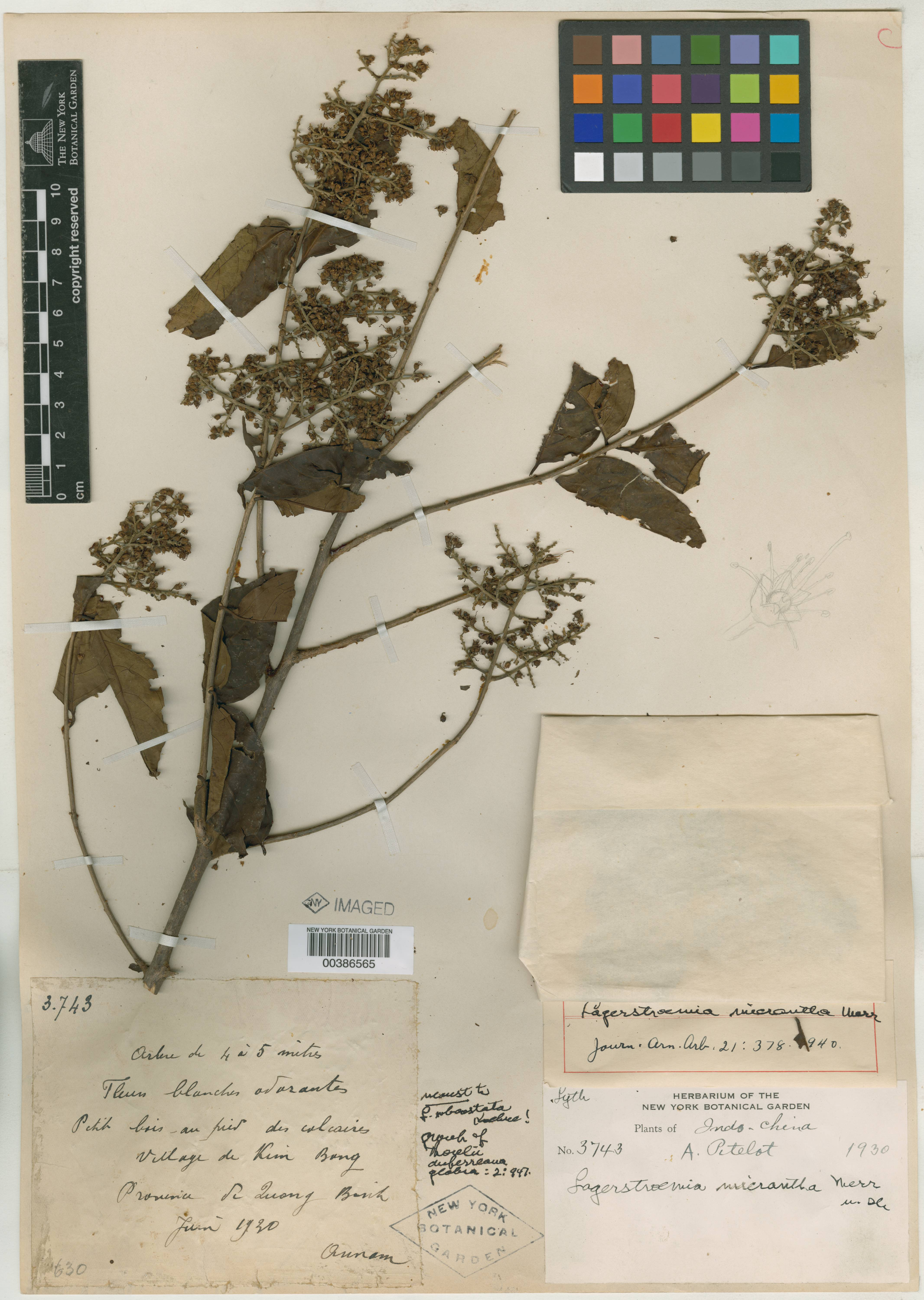

Scientific classification
- Kingdom: Plantae
- Clade: Tracheophytes
- Clade: Angiosperms
- Clade: Eudicots
- Clade: Rosids
- Order: Myrtales
- Family: Lythraceae
- Genus: Lagerstroemia
- Species: L. micrantha

Binomial name
- Lagerstroemia micrantha Merr.

= Lagerstroemia micrantha =

Species of flowering plant

Lagerstroemia micrantha is a species of crepe myrtle in the family Lythraceae. It is a shrub or small tree native to southern Vietnam. Lagerstroemia micrantha lives in wet, tropical areas. The flowers of Lagerstroemia micrantha bloom in the late summer to early fall. Lagerstroemia micrantha prefers loose soil.
