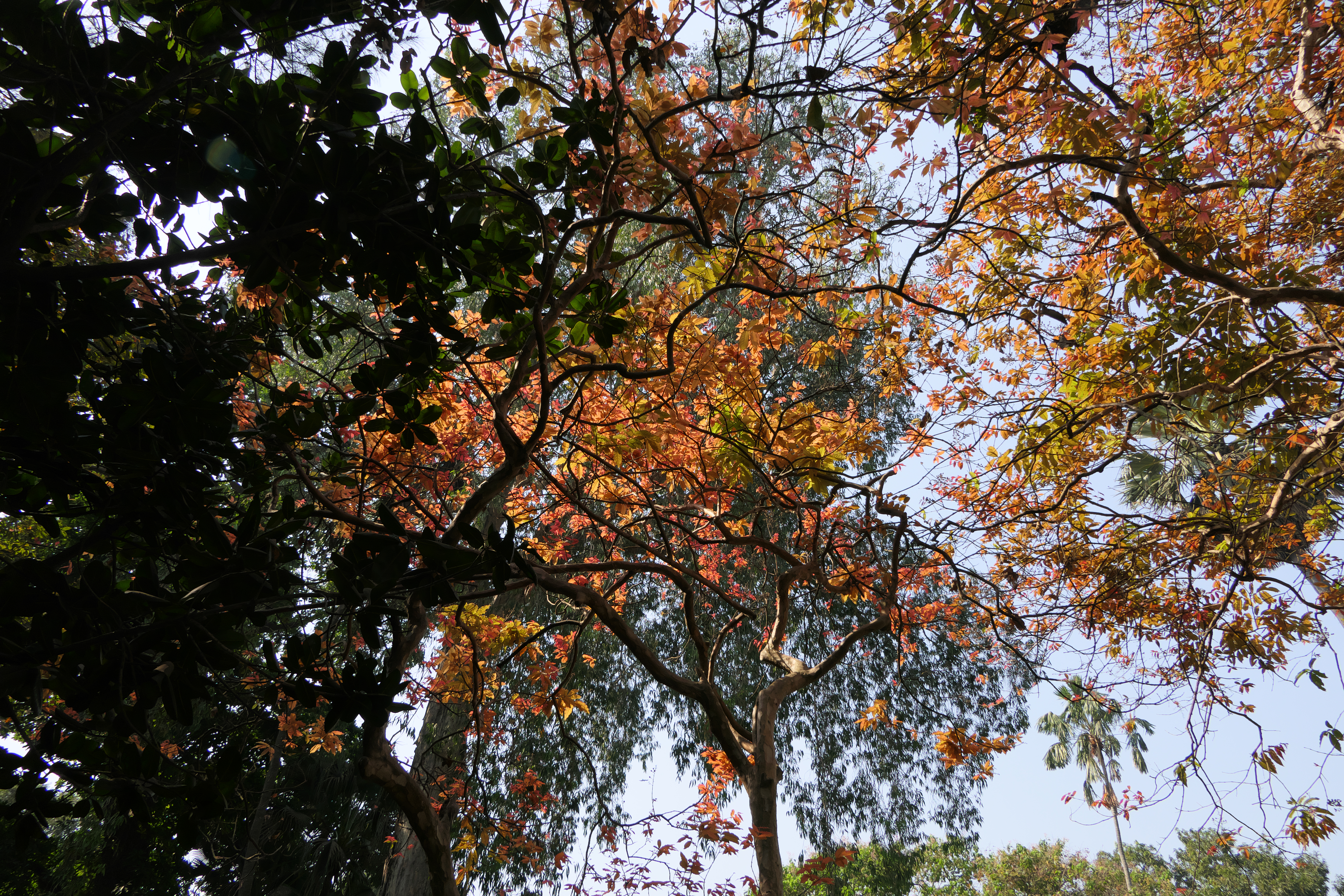

Scientific classification
- Kingdom: Plantae
- Clade: Tracheophytes
- Clade: Angiosperms
- Clade: Eudicots
- Clade: Rosids
- Order: Myrtales
- Family: Lythraceae
- Genus: Lagerstroemia
- Species: L. duperreana

Binomial name
- Lagerstroemia duperreana Pierre ex Gagnep.

Synonyms
- Lagerstroemia thorelii Gagnep.

= Lagerstroemia duperreana =

Species of tree

Lagerstroemia duperreana is a species of flowering plant in the family Lythraceae. It is found in Indochina, including in southern Vietnam, Laos, Thailand, and Cambodia.
