= Lagerstroemia langkawiensis =

Conservation status
- Endangered (IUCN 2.3)

Scientific classification
- Kingdom: Plantae
- Clade: Tracheophytes
- Clade: Angiosperms
- Clade: Eudicots
- Clade: Rosids
- Order: Myrtales
- Family: Lythraceae
- Genus: Lagerstroemia
- Species: L. langkawiensis

Binomial name
- Lagerstroemia langkawiensis Furtado & Montien

Species of tree

Lagerstroemia langkawiensis is a species of small tree in the family Lythraceae. It is endemic to Langkawi Island, Western Malaysia. It is threatened by habitat loss.
