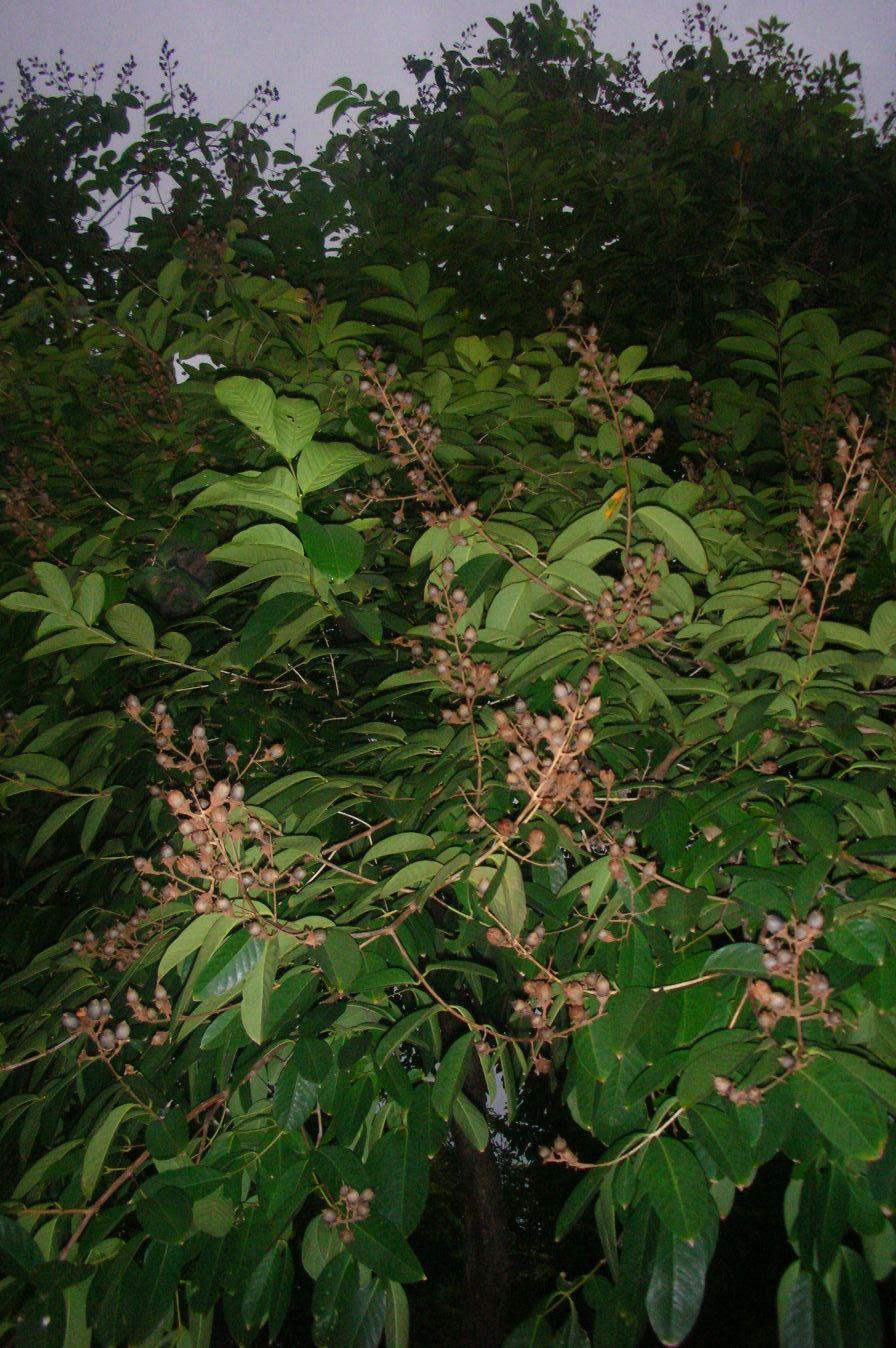

Scientific classification
- Kingdom: Plantae
- Clade: Embryophytes
- Clade: Tracheophytes
- Clade: Angiosperms
- Clade: Eudicots
- Clade: Rosids
- Order: Myrtales
- Family: Lythraceae
- Genus: Lagerstroemia
- Species: L. loudonii

Binomial name
- Lagerstroemia loudonii Teijsm. & Bin

= Lagerstroemia loudonii =

Species of tree

Lagerstroemia loudonii (Thai: เสลา; RTGS: salao) is a species of flowering plant in the family Lythraceae. Its origin is in Burma and Thailand, where it is found in the wild in Isan and the east down to central Thailand.

Salao is a medium-sized tree growing to a height between 10 and 20 m (35 and 65 ft). It is quite common as a decorative tree in the parks of Thailand owing to its bunches of pink flowers. The tree and its flower are the provincial tree as well as the provincial flower of Nakhon Sawan Province.
