= Lagerstroemia stenophylla =

Scientific classification
- Kingdom: Plantae
- Clade: Tracheophytes
- Clade: Angiosperms
- Clade: Eudicots
- Clade: Rosids
- Order: Myrtales
- Family: Lythraceae
- Genus: Lagerstroemia
- Species: L. stenophylla

Binomial name
- Lagerstroemia stenophylla B.H.Wu, Xing Hu & S.P.Dai

Species of flowering plant

Lagerstroemia stenophylla is a species from southeastern Shaanxi Province and northwestern Hubei Province of China.

== Distribution ==
This plant has been recorded in several locations within southeastern Shaanxi Province, including Baihe, Danfeng, Shanyang, Shangnan, Xunyang, Zhashui, and Zhen'an counties. It is also found in northwestern Hubei Province, specifically in Baokang County, Fang County, and the city of Shiyan. This species typically inhabits rocky slopes in ravines at elevations ranging from 290 to 770 meters.

== Description ==
Lagerstroemia stenophylla is a shrub or small tree ranging from approximately 0.5 to 3 meters in height. The bark is reddish-brown, developing longitudinal fissures and peeling slightly in maturity to expose the inner bark. Branchlets are scabridulous to glabrous, typically four-angled, and occasionally slightly winged.

=== Leaves ===
Leaves are mostly alternate or subopposite, with petioles measuring 1–3(4) mm, varying from densely scabridulous to glabrous. Leaf blades are herbaceous with entire margins, usually lanceolate to elliptic-lanceolate, though occasionally ovate or obovate-oblanceolate, measuring 2–6(7) × 0.7–2(2.3) cm. The base is cuneate, and the apex varies from acute to obtuse, rarely apiculate. The underside is pale green and scabridulous (especially along the midrib and lateral veins) to glabrous, while the upper surface is green, sparsely scabridulous to glabrous. There are typically 4–7 pairs of lateral veins.

=== Flower ===
The inflorescences are terminal or axillary panicles, (2)4–7 cm in length, and densely scabridulous. Flowers are sessile or nearly so, with flower buds that are turbinate to subglobose, excluding the pseudopedicels. The calyx tube is cup-shaped, 3.3–4.2 mm long, externally densely scabridulous to glabrous, bearing 10–12 distinct ribs or dark veins (sometimes indistinct), and internally glabrous with a glabrous annulus at the throat (which may be absent). There are usually six calyx lobes (occasionally five), triangular in shape, measuring 1–2.3 mm in both length and width. The epicalyx is absent, and the pseudopedicels range from 2 to 9 mm in length.

There are six petals, crumpled in appearance, shaped oblong, suborbicular, or ovate. The base ranges from cuneate to broadly cuneate, sometimes subcordate, with obtuse or rounded apices. Petals are 10–18 mm long, including claws 3–8 mm in length. The flower bears 20–28 dimorphic stamens: six are longer (approximately 15 mm), thicker, and reddish-brown, while the remainder are shorter (about 7 mm), thinner, and white. All filaments are glabrous. The ovary and styles (10–14 mm) are glabrous, and the stigmas are small.

=== Fruits ===
The fruit is a globose to oblong capsule, 6–8 mm long and 4.5–6 mm in diameter, dehiscing loculicidally with 4 to 7 valves. Seeds are about 6 mm long, including the wing.
