= Lagerstroemia engleriana =

Conservation status
- Least Concern (IUCN 3.1)

Scientific classification
- Kingdom: Plantae
- Clade: Tracheophytes
- Clade: Angiosperms
- Clade: Eudicots
- Clade: Rosids
- Order: Myrtales
- Family: Lythraceae
- Genus: Lagerstroemia
- Species: L. engleriana

Binomial name
- Lagerstroemia engleriana Koehne

Species of flowering plant

Lagerstroemia engleriana is a species of crepe myrtle in the family Lythraceae. Its range spans from Sulawesi, Indonesia to Papua New Guinea and reaches south to northwest and northeast Australia. Unlike typical Lagerstroemia species, L. engleriana thrives in the seasonally dry and harsh Australian monsoon tropics.
