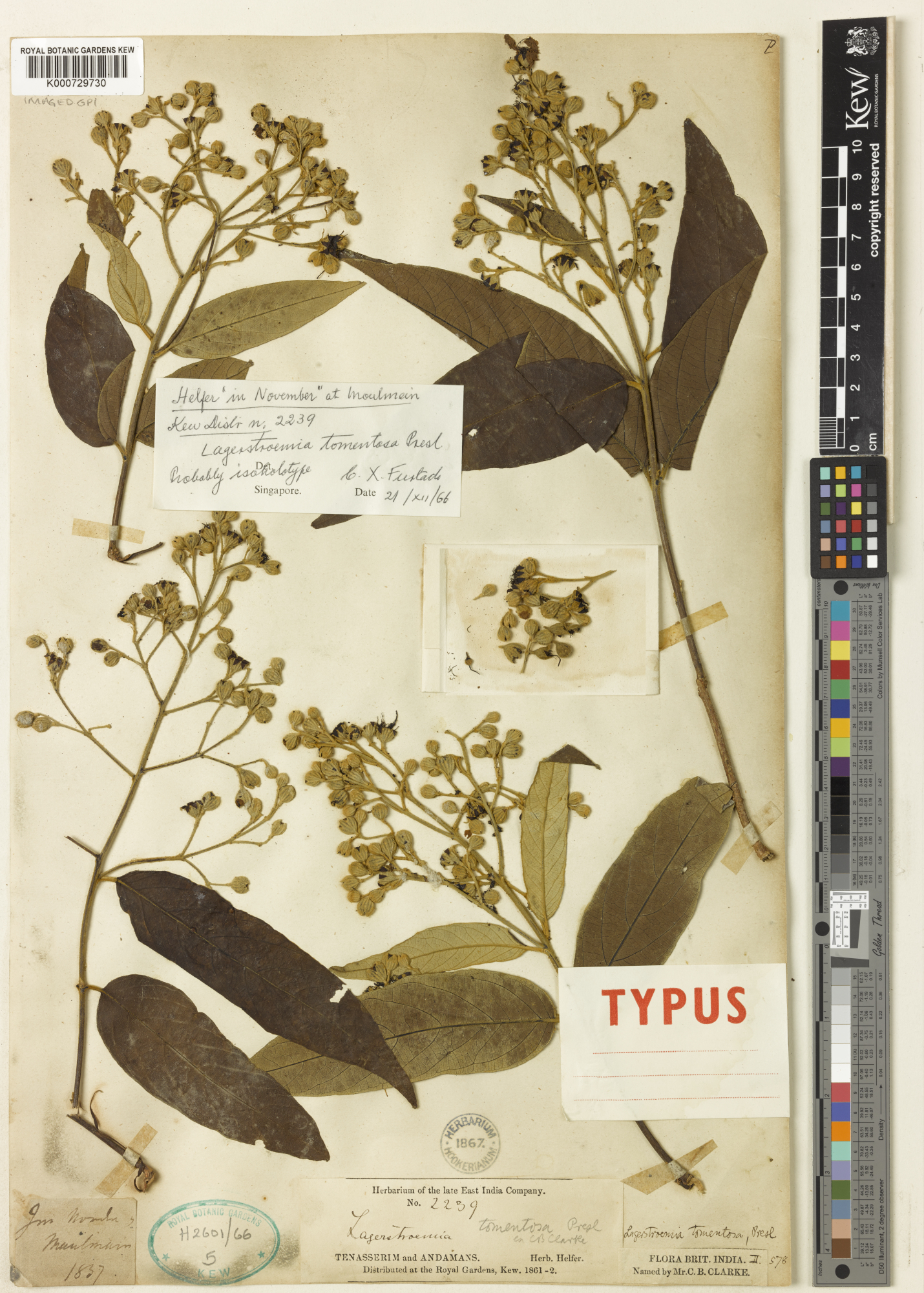

Scientific classification
- Kingdom: Plantae
- Clade: Tracheophytes
- Clade: Angiosperms
- Clade: Eudicots
- Clade: Rosids
- Order: Myrtales
- Family: Lythraceae
- Genus: Lagerstroemia
- Species: L. tomentosa

Binomial name
- Lagerstroemia tomentosa C. Presl

Synonyms
- Lagerstroemia pubescens Wall.

= Lagerstroemia tomentosa =

Species of tree

Lagerstroemia tomentosa is a species of flowering plant in the family Lythraceae. It is found in Indochina, including in Yunnan (China), Vietnam, Laos, Thailand, and Cambodia.

== Etymology ==
Tomentosa is a Latin word meaning 'covered in hairs'.
