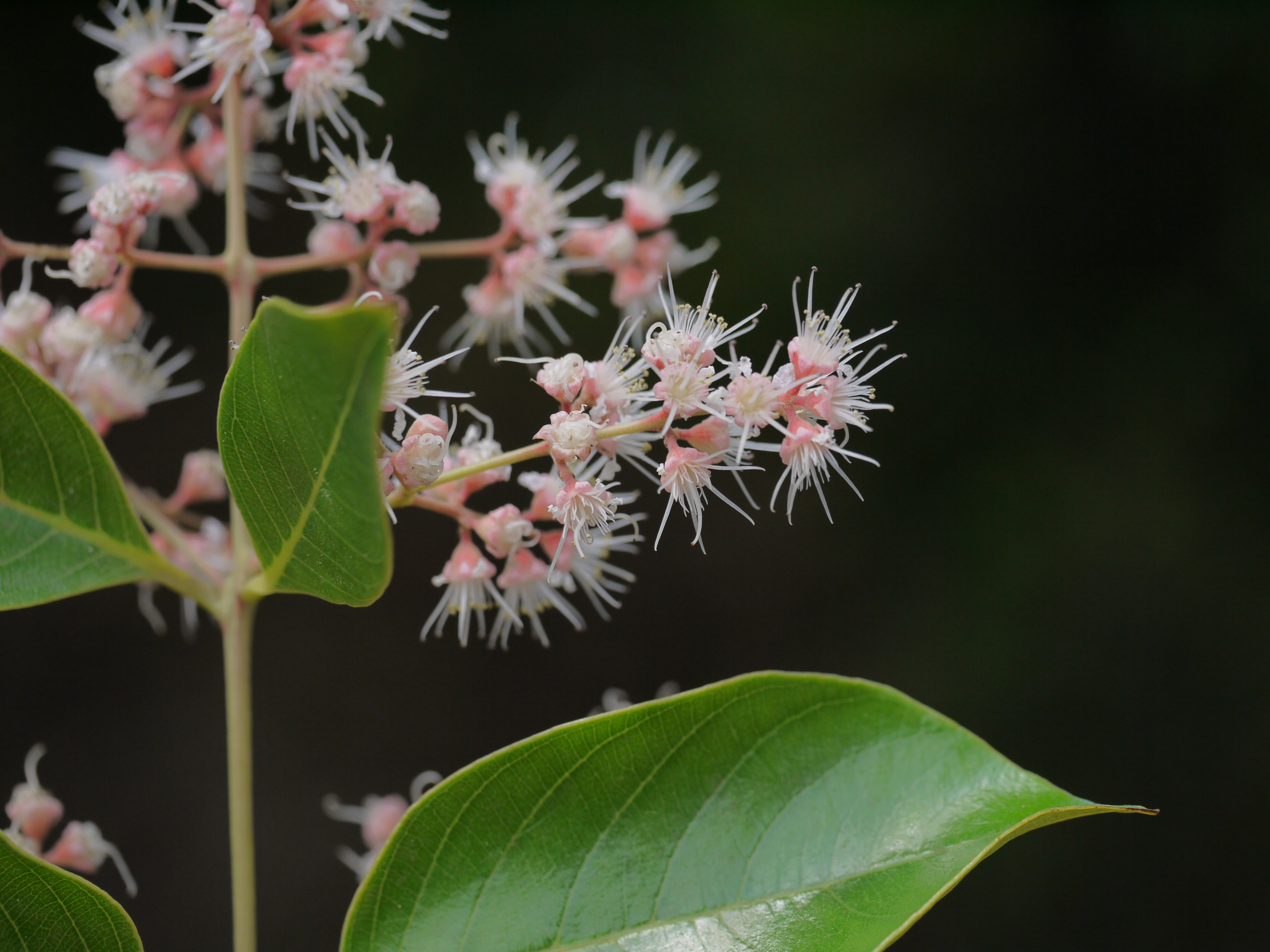
- Leaves and flowers

Scientific classification
- Kingdom: Plantae
- Clade: Embryophytes
- Clade: Tracheophytes
- Clade: Spermatophytes
- Clade: Angiosperms
- Clade: Eudicots
- Clade: Rosids
- Order: Myrtales
- Family: Lythraceae
- Genus: Lagerstroemia
- Species: L. microcarpa

Binomial name
- Lagerstroemia microcarpa Wt.

= Lagerstroemia microcarpa =

Species of tree

Lagerstroemia microcarpa is a flowering tree that is endemic to the Western Ghats mountain range, located in southwestern India.

== Description ==
The tree grows more than 30 m (100 ft) tall. It is easily distinguishable by its smooth white bark that peels off in large papery flakes. In the Western Ghats it naturally occurs in moist deciduous and semi-evergreen forests, usually in openings. It is a light demanding tree in the later stages of its life. It has white flowers.

Even though in the natural forests enormous specimens of Lagerstroemia microcarpa are abundant, seedlings are usually absent. As per KFRI's research, every year this tree is known to produce millions of seeds out of which very few to none germinate on account of the non-viability of majority of seeds (due to the lack of a viable embryo, except rarely) and also the gap between seed dispersal and the rainy season. KFRI also found that the rate of natural regeneration is adversely affected by forest fire. Assisted germination using vermiculite or foam sheet have been found to give fairly reasonable germination percentages. Such trials may need to be conducted in the future to prevent the disappearance of this species from the forests.

== Gallery ==
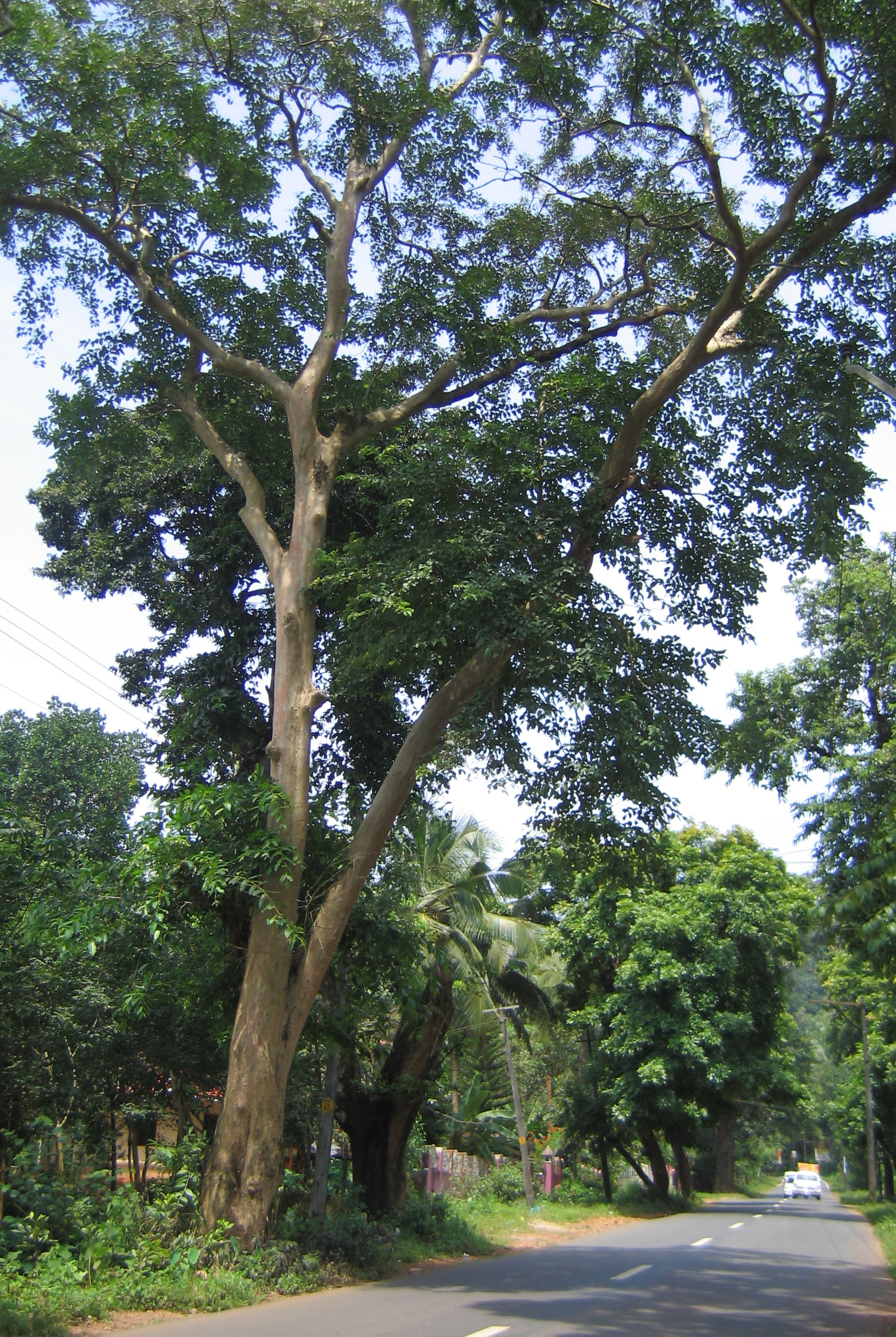
Tree

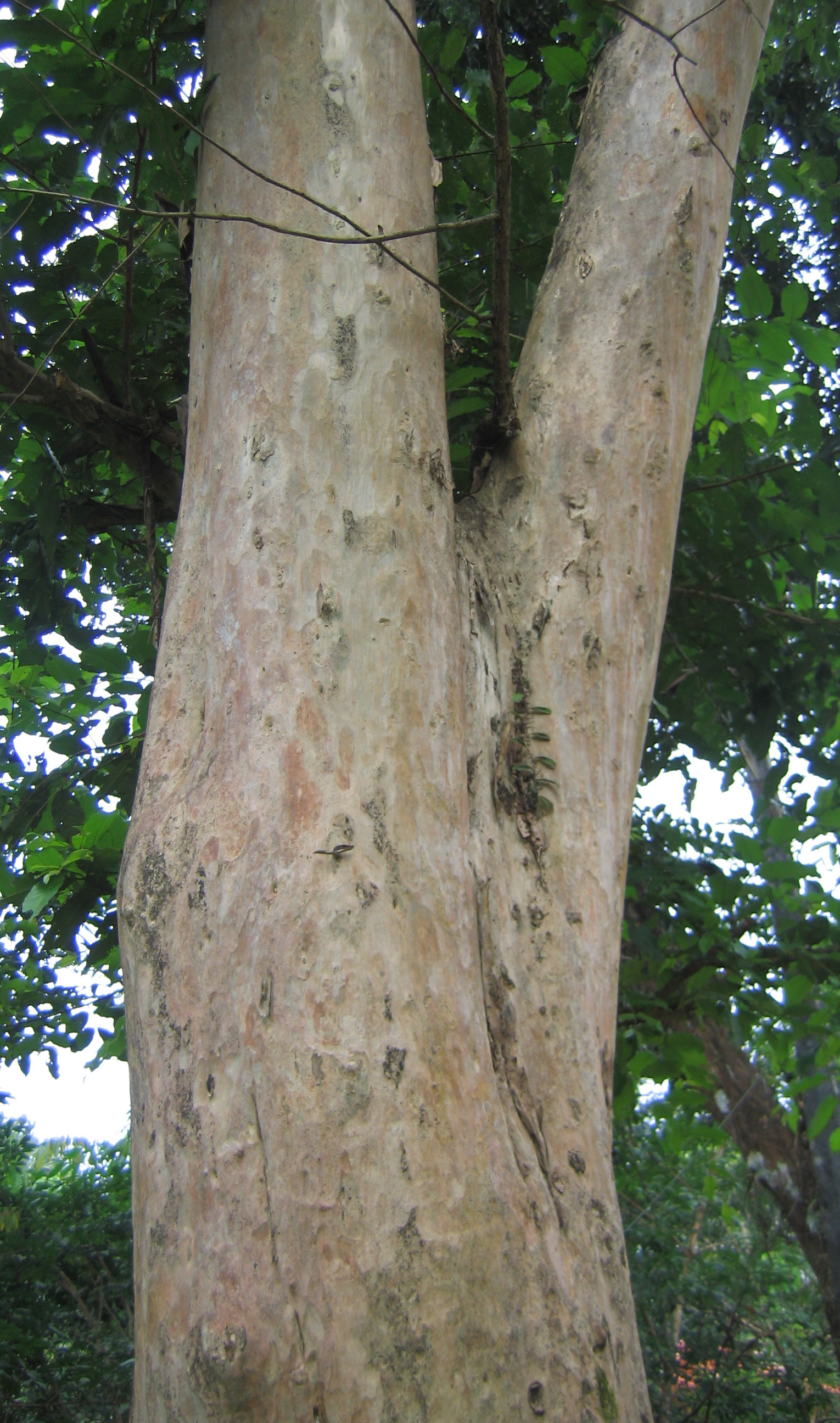
Bark

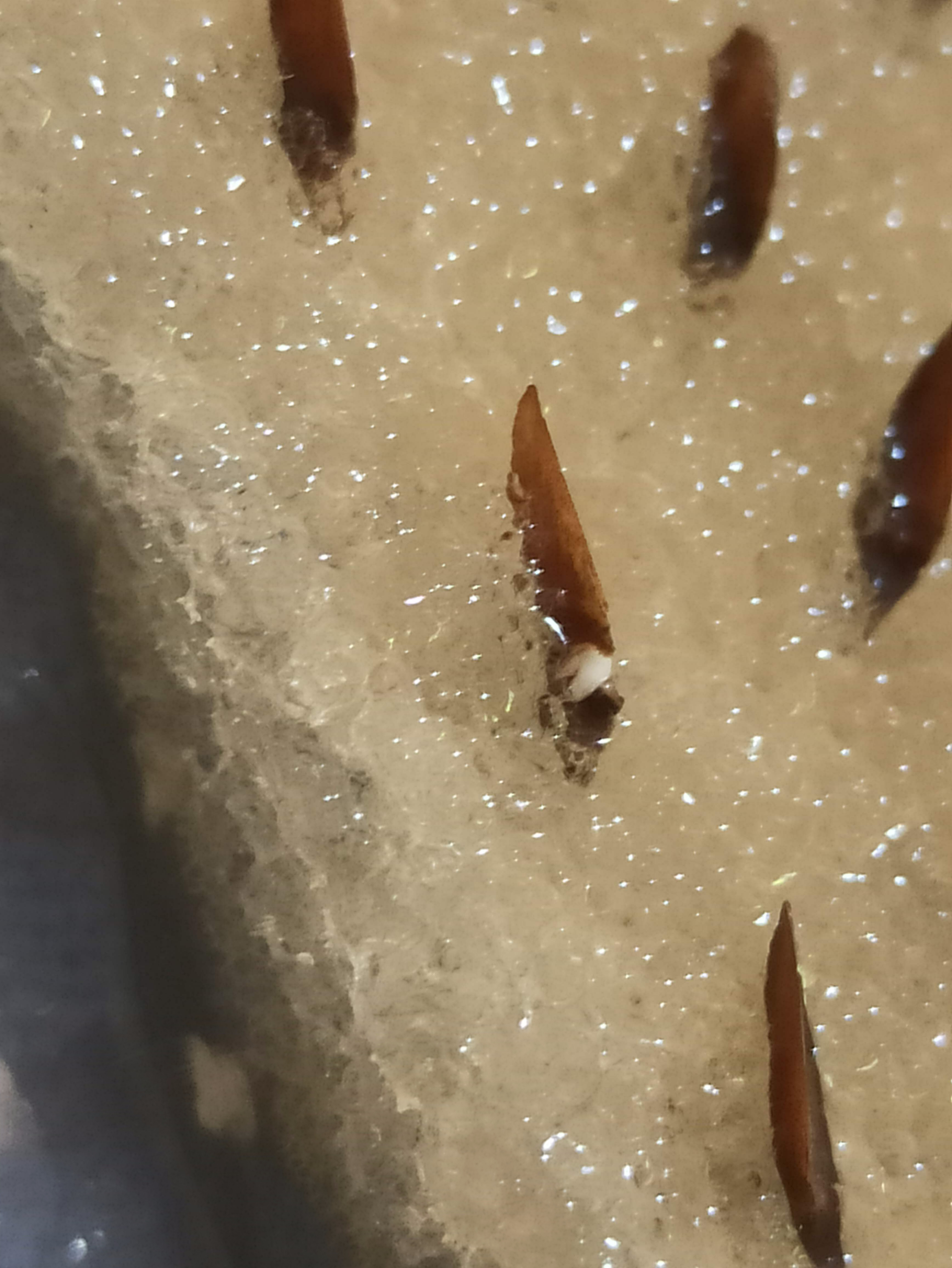
Germinating seed

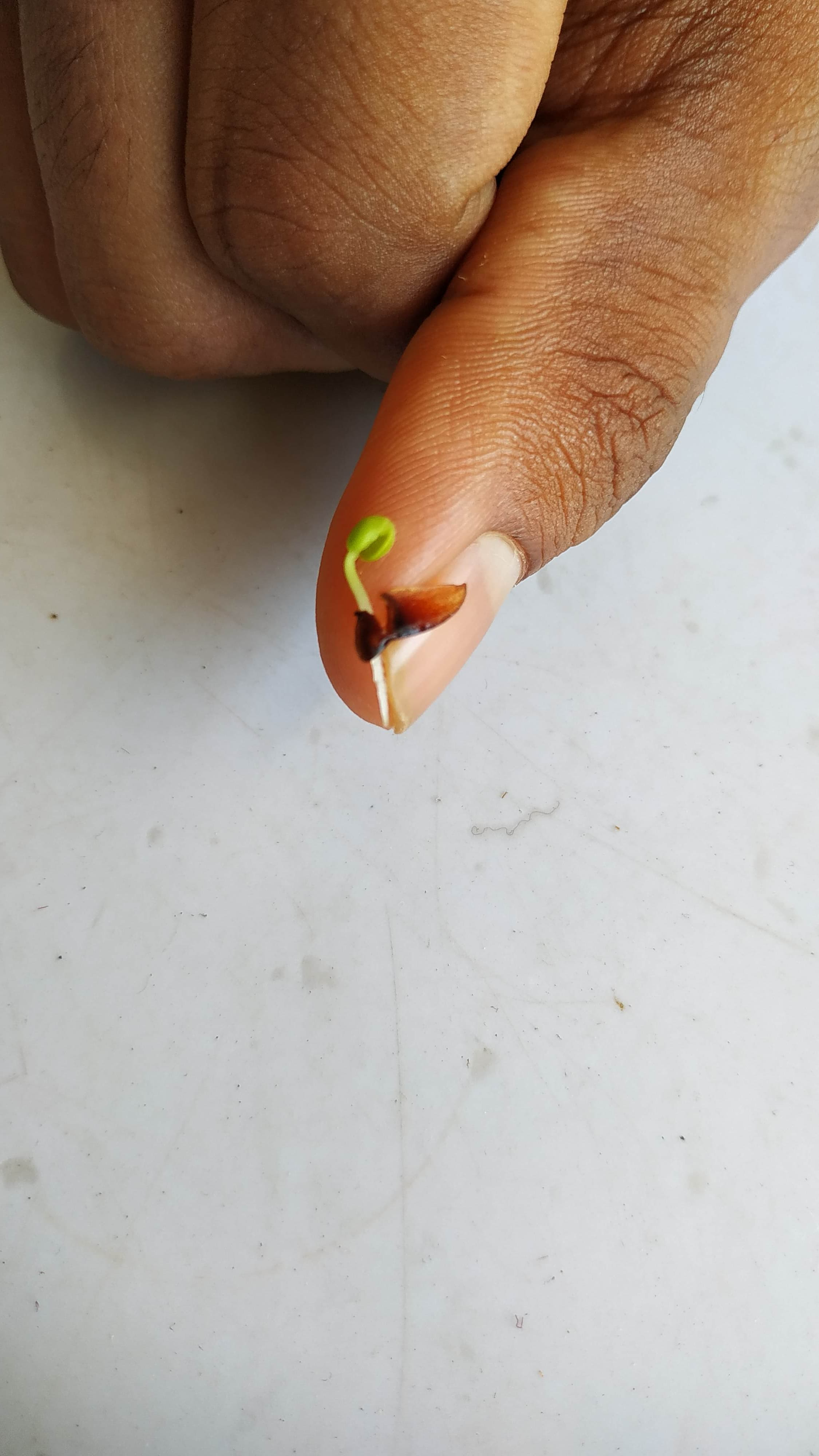
Seedling with seed coat

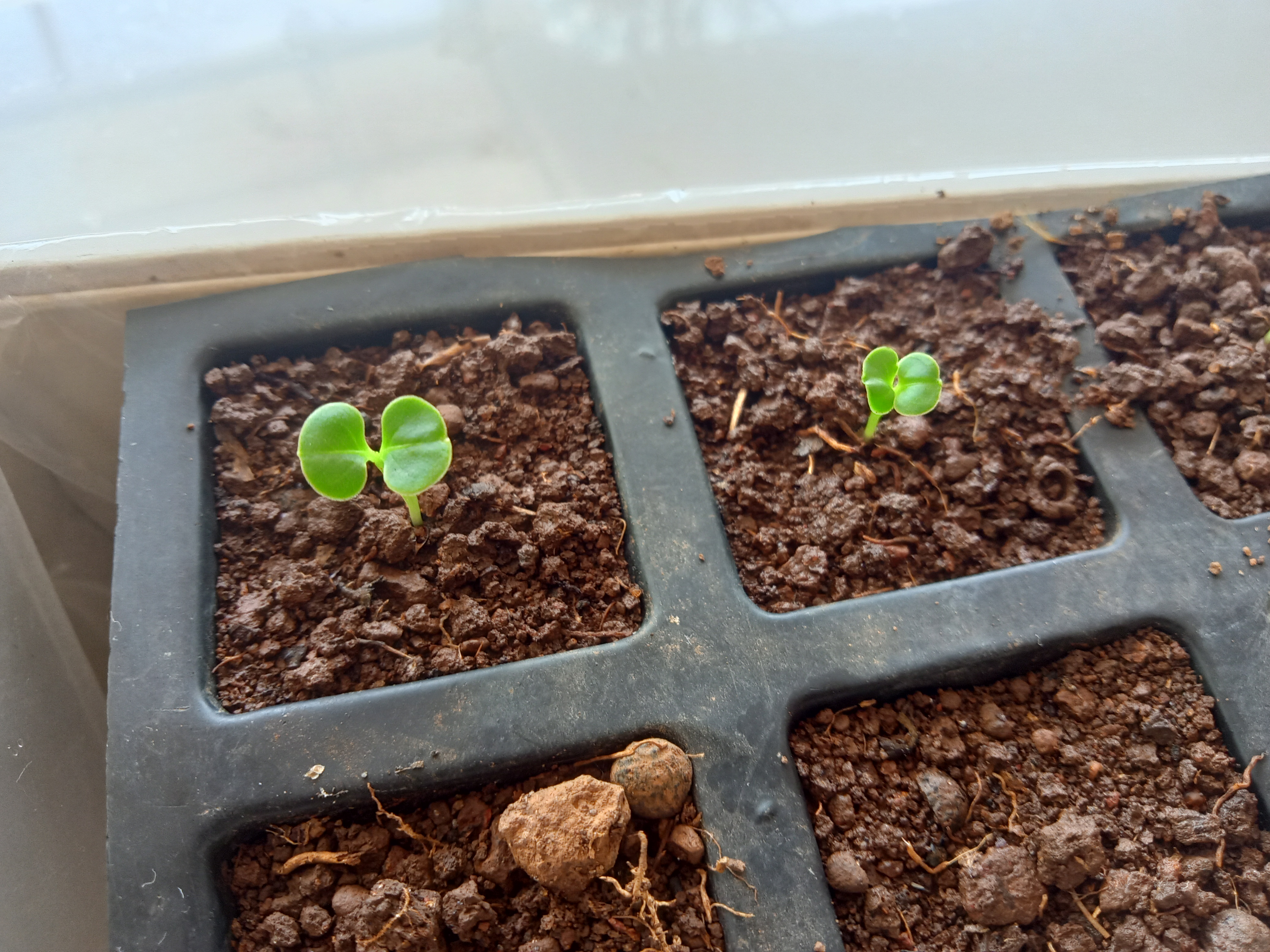
Seedlings with cotyledon

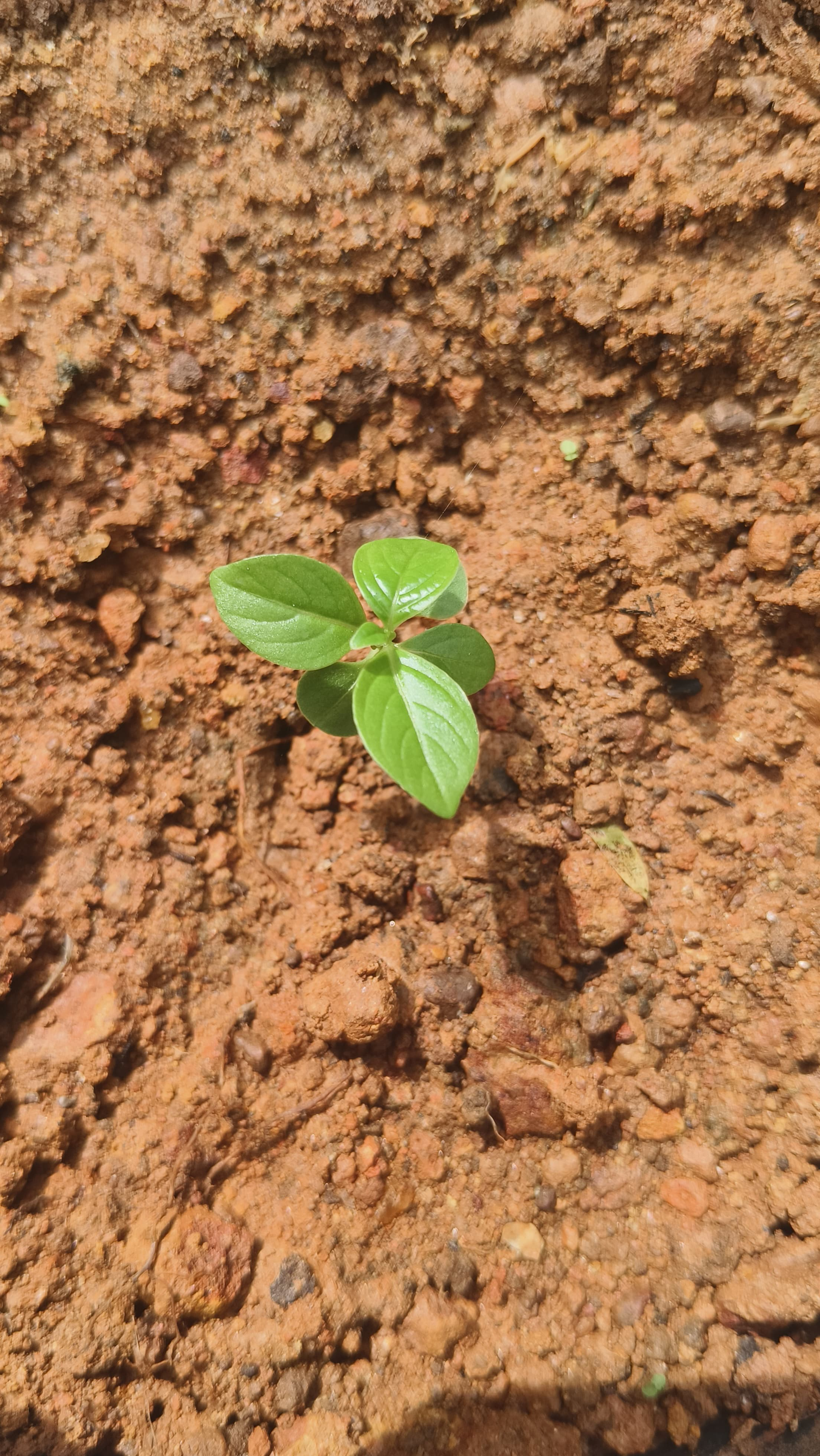
Seedling
