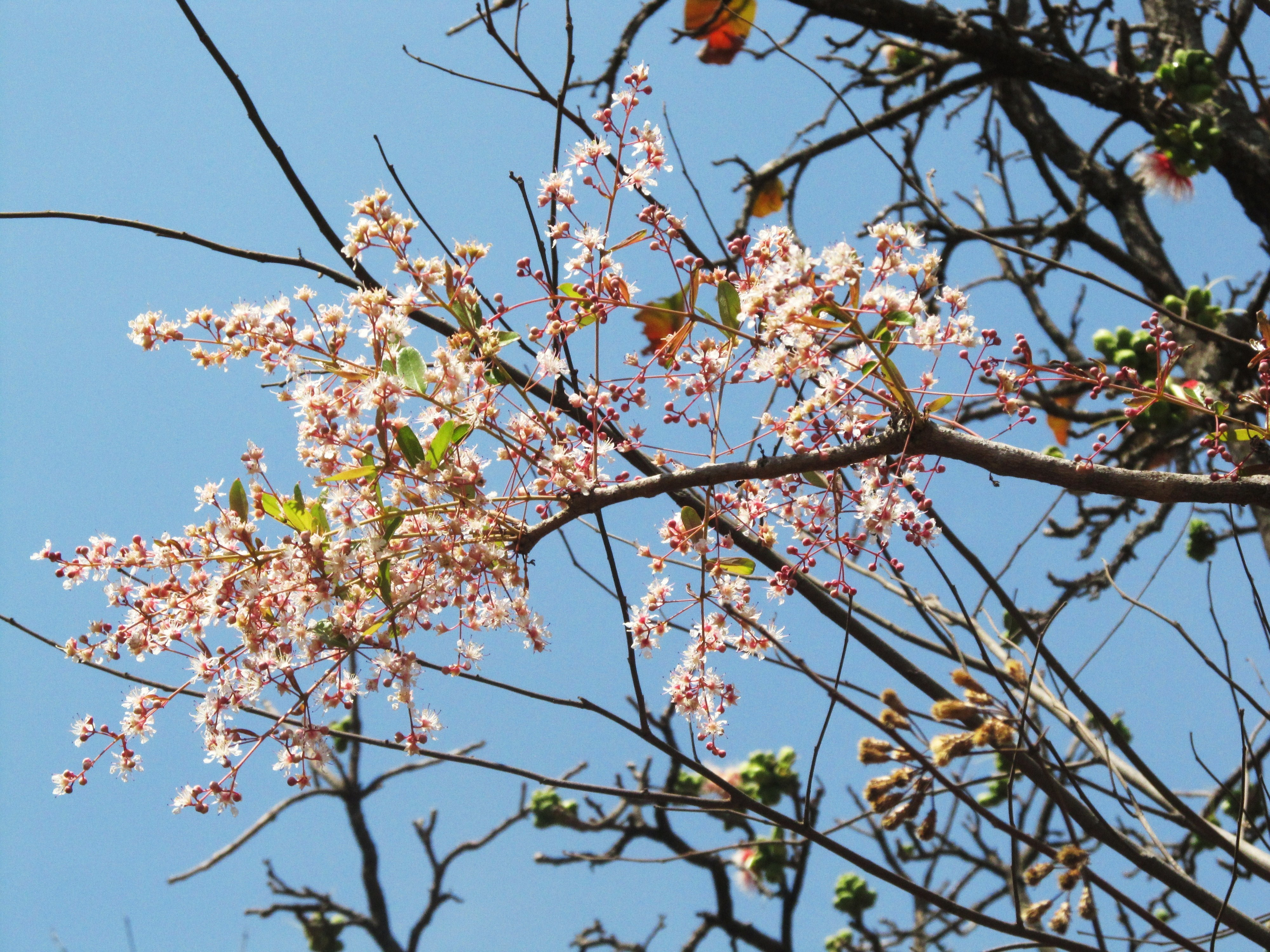
- Flowering

Conservation status
- Least Concern (IUCN 3.1)

Scientific classification
- Kingdom: Plantae
- Clade: Embryophytes
- Clade: Tracheophytes
- Clade: Spermatophytes
- Clade: Angiosperms
- Clade: Eudicots
- Clade: Rosids
- Order: Myrtales
- Family: Lythraceae
- Genus: Lagerstroemia
- Species: L. parviflora

Binomial name
- Lagerstroemia parviflora Roxb.

Synonyms
- Murtughas parviflora (Roxb.) Kuntze

= Lagerstroemia parviflora =

Species of flowering plant

Lagerstroemia parviflora is a species of plant in the family Lythraceae. It is native to Assam, Bangladesh, East Himalaya, India, Myanmar, Nepal and West Himalaya. It has been given the conservation status of least concern by the International Union for Conservation of Nature.
