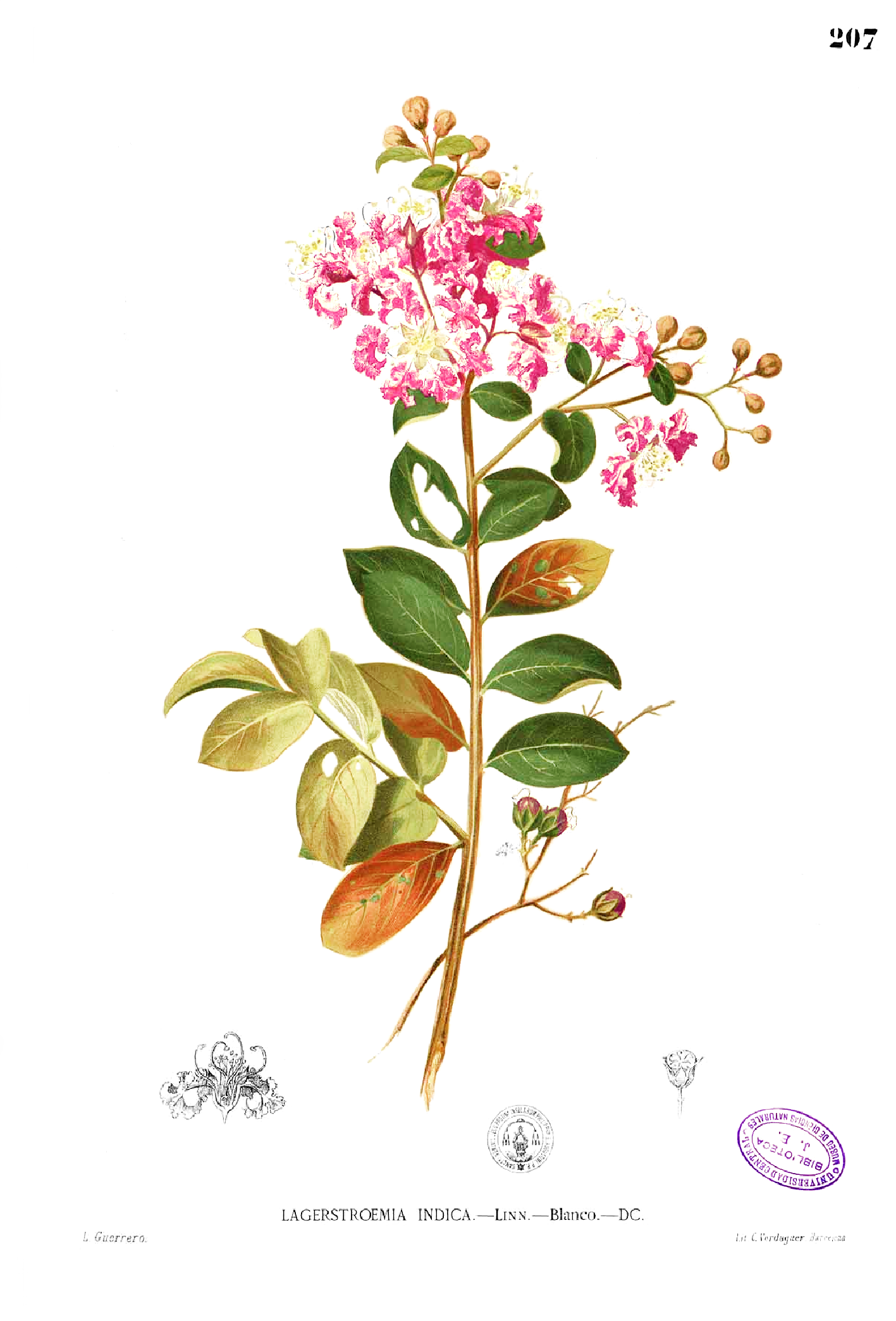

Scientific classification
- Kingdom: Plantae
- Clade: Tracheophytes
- Clade: Angiosperms
- Clade: Eudicots
- Clade: Rosids
- Order: Myrtales
- Family: Lythraceae
- Subfamily: Lythroideae
- Genus: Lagerstroemia; L.

Species
- See text

Synonyms
- 10 synonyms: Murtughas L. ex Kuntze; Tsjinkin Adans.; Adambea Lam.; Adamboe Adans.; Catu-adamboe Adans.; Fatioa DC.; Munchausia L.; Orias Dode; Pterocalymma Turcz.; Sotularia Raf.

= Lagerstroemia =

Crape myrtle

Genus of trees

Lagerstroemia (/ˌleɪɡərˈstriːmiə/), commonly known as crape myrtle (also commonly spelled crepe myrtle, crape-myrtle, or crapemyrtle), is a genus of deciduous and evergreen trees and shrubs native to the Indian subcontinent, southeast Asia, northern Australia, and other parts of Oceania, cultivated in warmer climates around the world. It is a member of the family Lythraceae, which is also known as the loosestrife family. These flowering trees are often planted both privately and commercially as ornamentals.

== Etymology ==
The genus Lagerstroemia was first described by Carl Linnaeus. It is named after Swedish merchant Magnus von Lagerström, a director of the Swedish East India Company, who supplied Linnaeus with plants he collected.

== Description ==
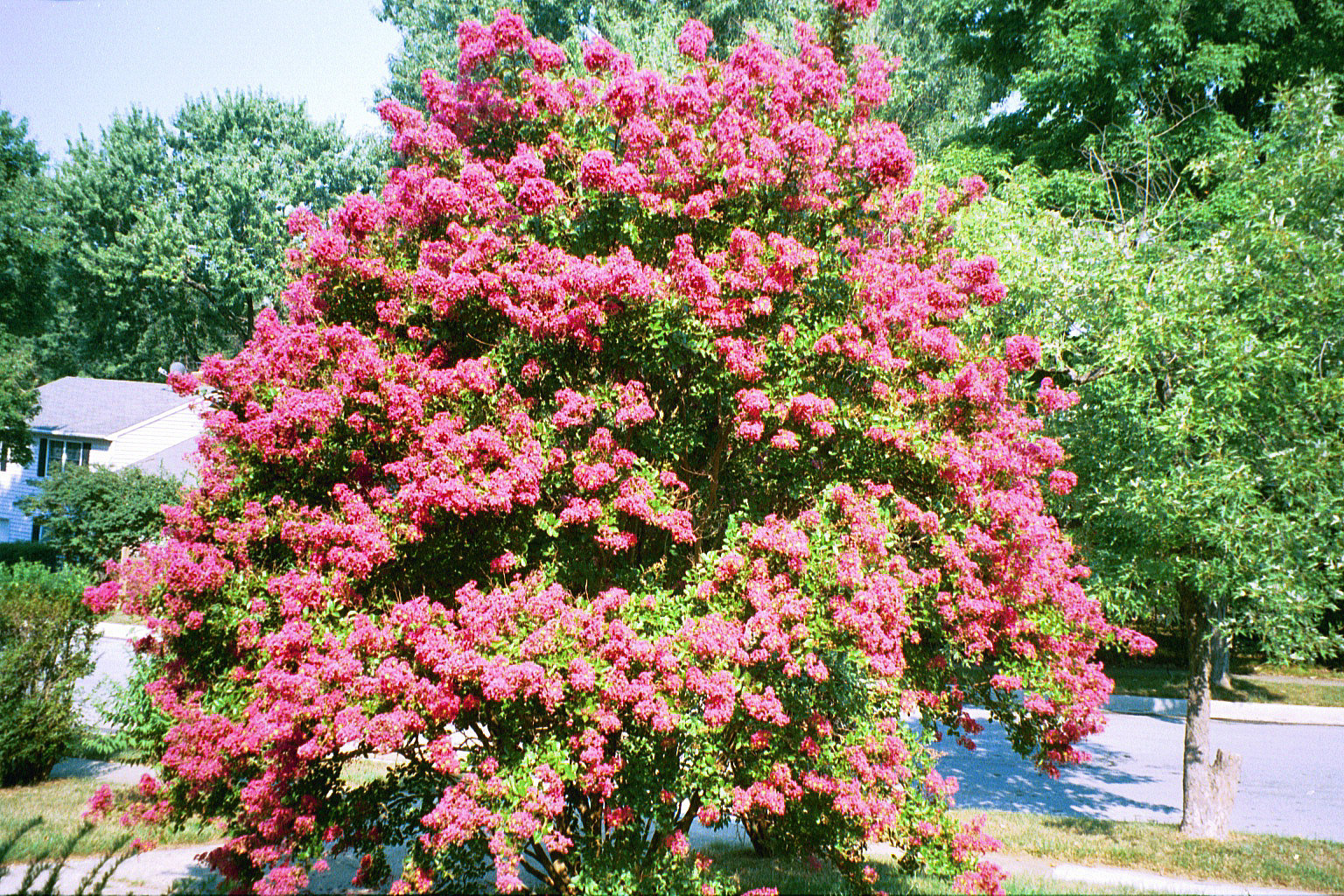
A 4-metre (12 ft) crape myrtle in Lutherville, Maryland

Crape myrtles are chiefly known for their colorful and long-lasting flowers, which occur in summer. Most species of Lagerstroemia have sinewy, fluted stems and branches with a mottled appearance that arises from having bark that sheds throughout the year. Its leaves come in pairs, one located directly across from the other on the stem, each leaf consisting of a single smooth-edged blade, varying in size from 5–20 cm (2–8 in). While all species are woody in nature, they can range in height from over 30 m (100 ft) to under 30 cm (1 ft); most, however, are small to medium, multiple-trunked trees and shrubs. The leaves of temperate species provide autumn color.

Flowers are produced in summer and autumn in panicles of crinkled flowers. This crinkled appearance of its flowers is the source of its name: a "crape" being a historically common mourning bonnet with a distinctively crisp and crimped appearance. Colors vary from deep purple to red to white, with almost every shade in between. Although no blue-flowered varieties exist, the flowers trend toward the blue end of the spectrum with no orange or yellow except in stamens and pistils. The fruit is a capsule, green and succulent at first, then ripening to dark brown or black dryness. It splits along six or seven lines, producing teeth much like those of the calyx, and releases numerous, small, winged seeds.

== Species ==
As of June 2026, Plants of the World Online accepts the following 50 species:

- Lagerstroemia amabilis Makino
- Lagerstroemia anhuiensis X.H.Guo & S.B.Zhou
- Lagerstroemia balansae Koehne
- Lagerstroemia calyculata Kurz
- Lagerstroemia caudata Chun & F.C.How ex S.K.Lee & L.F.Lau
- Lagerstroemia celebica Blume
- Lagerstroemia densa C.H.Gu & D.D.Ma
- Lagerstroemia densiflora W.J.de Wilde & Duyfjes
- Lagerstroemia duperreana Pierre ex Gagnep.
- Lagerstroemia engleriana Koehne
- Lagerstroemia excelsa (Dode) Chun ex S.K.Lee & L.F.Lau
- Lagerstroemia floribunda Jack
- Lagerstroemia fordii Koehne
- Lagerstroemia gagnepainii Furtado & Montien
- Lagerstroemia glabra Koehne
- Lagerstroemia guilinensis S.K.Lee & L.F.Lau
- Lagerstroemia huamotensis W.J.de Wilde & Duyfjes
- Lagerstroemia hypoleuca Kurz
- Lagerstroemia indica L.
- Lagerstroemia kratiensis W.J.de Wilde & Duyfjes
- Lagerstroemia langkawiensis Furtado & Montien
- Lagerstroemia lecomtei Gagnep.
- Lagerstroemia limii Merr.
- Lagerstroemia loudonii Teijsm. & Binn.
- Lagerstroemia macrocarpa Kurz
- Lagerstroemia menglaensis C.H.Gu, M.C.Ji & D.D.Ma
- Lagerstroemia micrantha Merr.
- Lagerstroemia microcarpa Wight
- Lagerstroemia minuticarpa Debb. ex P.C.Kanjilal
- Lagerstroemia noei Craib
- Lagerstroemia ovalifolia Teijsm. & Binn.
- Lagerstroemia paniculata (Turcz.) S.Vidal
- Lagerstroemia parviflora Roxb.
- Lagerstroemia petiolaris Pierre ex Gagnep.
- Lagerstroemia poilanei W.J.de Wilde & Duyfjes
- Lagerstroemia pterosepala Furtado & Montien
- Lagerstroemia pustulata Furtado & Montien
- Lagerstroemia ruffordii T.T.Pham & Tagane
- Lagerstroemia speciosa (L.) Martyn
- Lagerstroemia spireana Gagnep.
- Lagerstroemia stenophylla B.H.Wu, Xing Hu & S.P.Dai
- Lagerstroemia subangulata (Craib) Furtado & Montien
- Lagerstroemia subcostata Koehne
- Lagerstroemia suprareticulata S.K.Lee & L.F.Lau
- Lagerstroemia tomentosa C.Presl
- Lagerstroemia undulata Koehne
- Lagerstroemia vanosii W.J.de Wilde & Duyfjes
- Lagerstroemia venusta Wall. ex C.B.Clarke
- Lagerstroemia villosa Wall. ex Kurz
- Lagerstroemia yangchunensis B.H.Wu & G.D.Chen

Hybrids

- Lagerstroemia × egolfii – a hybrid originating in the U.S. National Arboretum's breeding programs of the mid-20th century

== Ecology ==
Lagerstroemia species are used as food plants by the larvae of some Lepidoptera (moth and butterfly) species, including Endoclita malabaricus.

The leaves of L. parviflora are fed on by the Antheraea paphia moth, which produces the tussar silk, a form of wild silk of commercial importance in India.

Crape myrtles are susceptible to several pests and diseases, most notably, fungus-caused powdery mildew, and more recently, bark scale, caused by aphids leaving a black dark fungal infection in their wake.

== Uses ==
In their respective climates, both subtropical and tropical species are common in domestic and commercial landscapes. The timber of some species has been used to manufacture bridges, furniture, and railway sleepers, but in Vietnam's Cát Tiên National Park, the dominant stands of Lagerstroemia calyculata in secondary forest are thought to have survived (after episodes of logging) due to the low quality of wood.

=== Cultivation ===
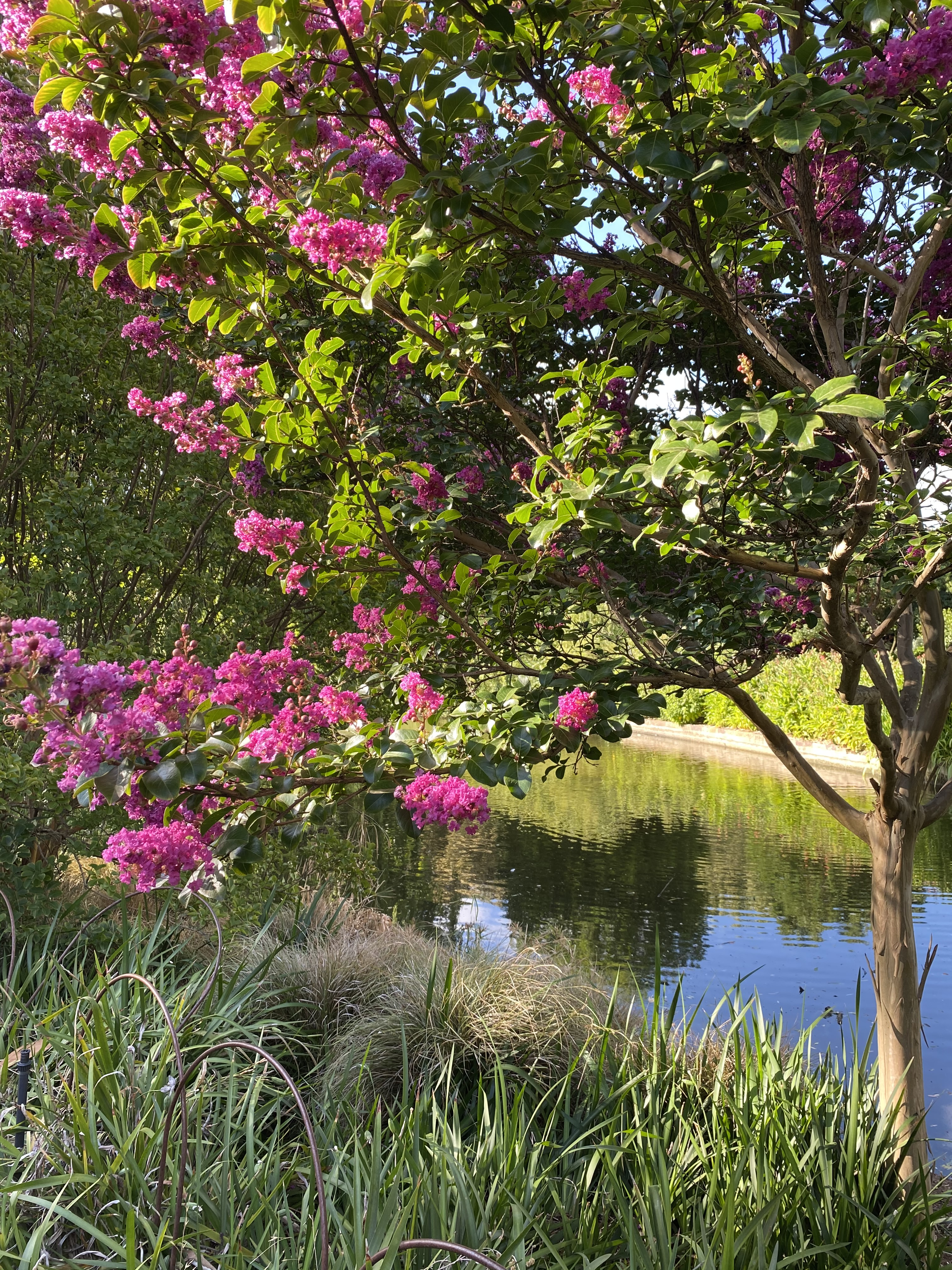
Crepe myrtle trees by a pond in the Adelaide Botanic Gardens

Certain species of crape myrtle are used in landscaping and gardening as screens, lawn specimens, shrub borders, and container plants. Since crape myrtles are found in many places, opinions differ as to how to cultivate them in landscaping. Crape myrtles are best cultivated in warmer southern climates, U.S. zones 7–9, and prefer full sun. They occur in a variety of flowering colors and size.

Crape myrtles might have been considered messy in the past, but their seedpods cannot stain concrete, so are best planted near swimming pools, decks, and sidewalks.

The common crape myrtle (L. indica) from China and Korea was introduced c. 1790 to Charleston, South Carolina, in the United States, by French botanist André Michaux. In the wild, the species is most often found as a multiple-stemmed, large shrub, but 200 years of cultivation have resulted in a huge number of cultivars of widely varying characteristics. Today, crape myrtle varieties can fulfill many landscaping needs, from tidy street trees to dense barrier hedges to fast-growing dwarf types of less than 60 cm (2 ft), which can go from seed to bloom in a season (allowing gardeners in places where the plant is not winter-hardy to still enjoy the intense colors of the frilly flowers). In Europe, crape myrtle is common in the south of France, the Iberian Peninsula, and most of Italy; in the United States, it is an iconic plant of gardens across the Southern United States. It has been cultivated in many parts of Australia, but is most common in the areas of the country with a warm Mediterranean climate such as the south-east and west. While not as widely known, the Japanese crape myrtle, L. fauriei, from central and southern Japan, is becoming increasingly important, both as a landscaping plant and as a parent in complex hybrids with L. indica. This species is distinctly tree-like, with colorful, deciduous bark and dark green leaves, which are more resistant to fungal diseases than are those of its more popular relative. The Japanese name for this tree is saru suberi (猿滑、百日紅; literally "monkey slip", latter spelling ateji), which refers to the smooth, slippery bark. Flowers are as large as those of L. indica, but are white with only the slightest pink flush appearing in some individuals. Japanese crape myrtle is hardier to cold than many strains of L. indica, a characteristic (along with fungal resistance, tree form, and colorful bark) that makes it valuable as genetic material for hybridization. Cultivars available include 'Kiowa', 'Fantasy', and 'Townhouse'.

L. speciosa, known as queen crape myrtle, giant crape myrtle, or banabá, originates in subtropical and tropical India. It can be grown in any similar climate, but in the United States is suitable only for Florida, southernmost Texas, South Louisiana, coastal southern California, and Hawaii. It is a large evergreen tree with colorful rosy-mauve flowers and striking white bark, suitable for public parks and avenues; only the seed-grown species is commonly available for sale, unlike L. indica and L. fauriei, which have dozens of cultivars.

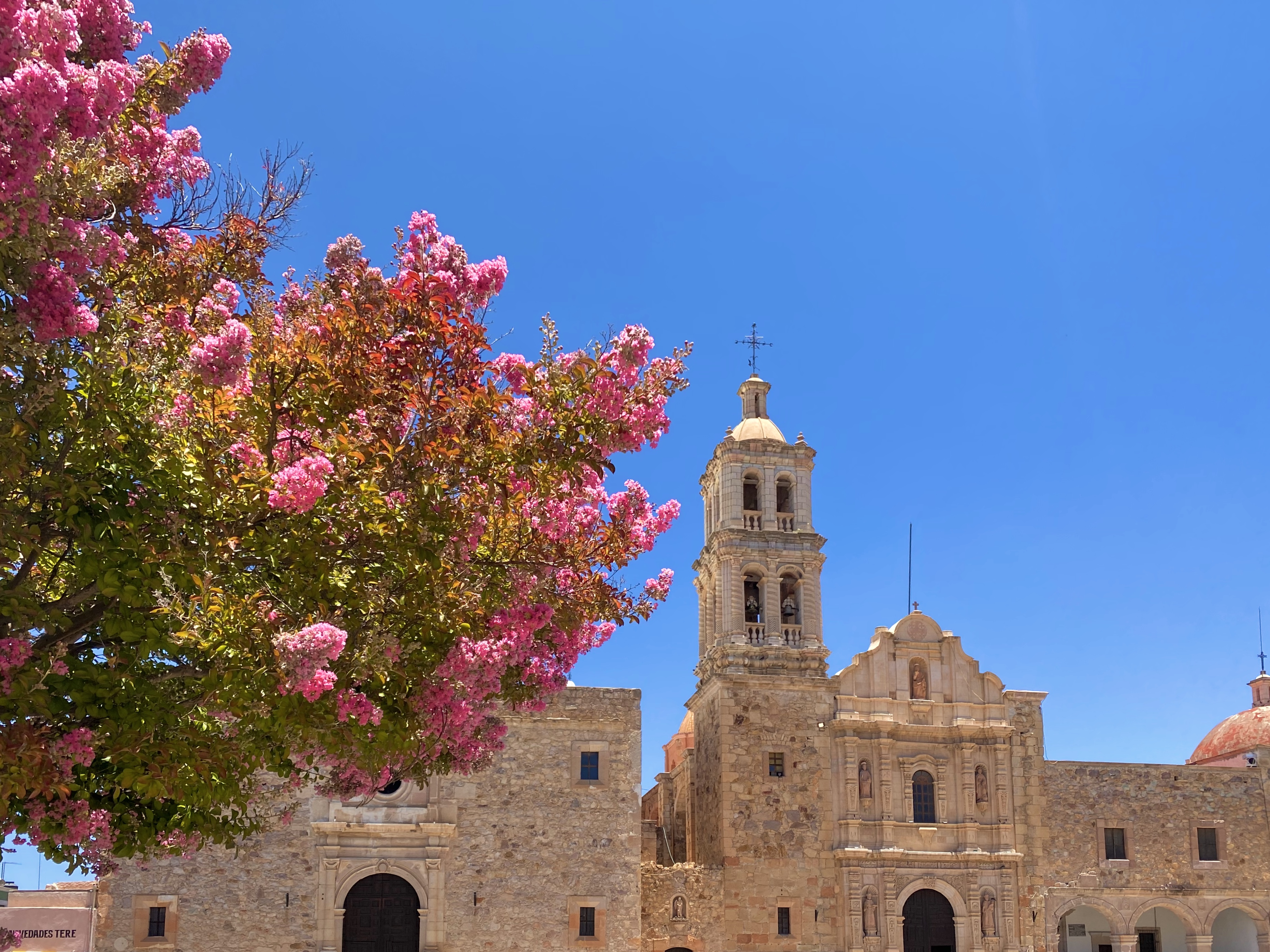
Crape myrtle during summer in Sombrerete, Mexico

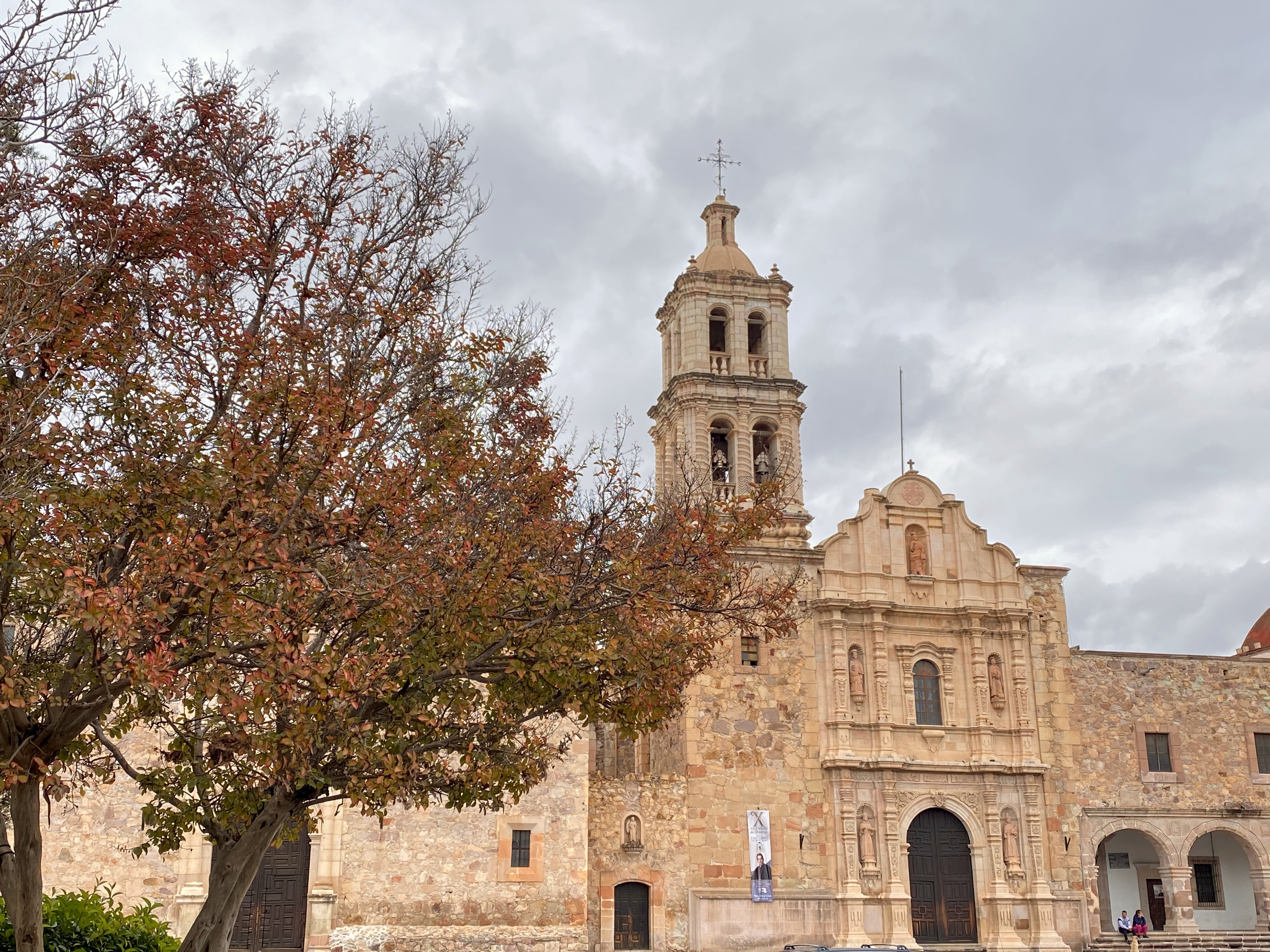
Same tree during fall

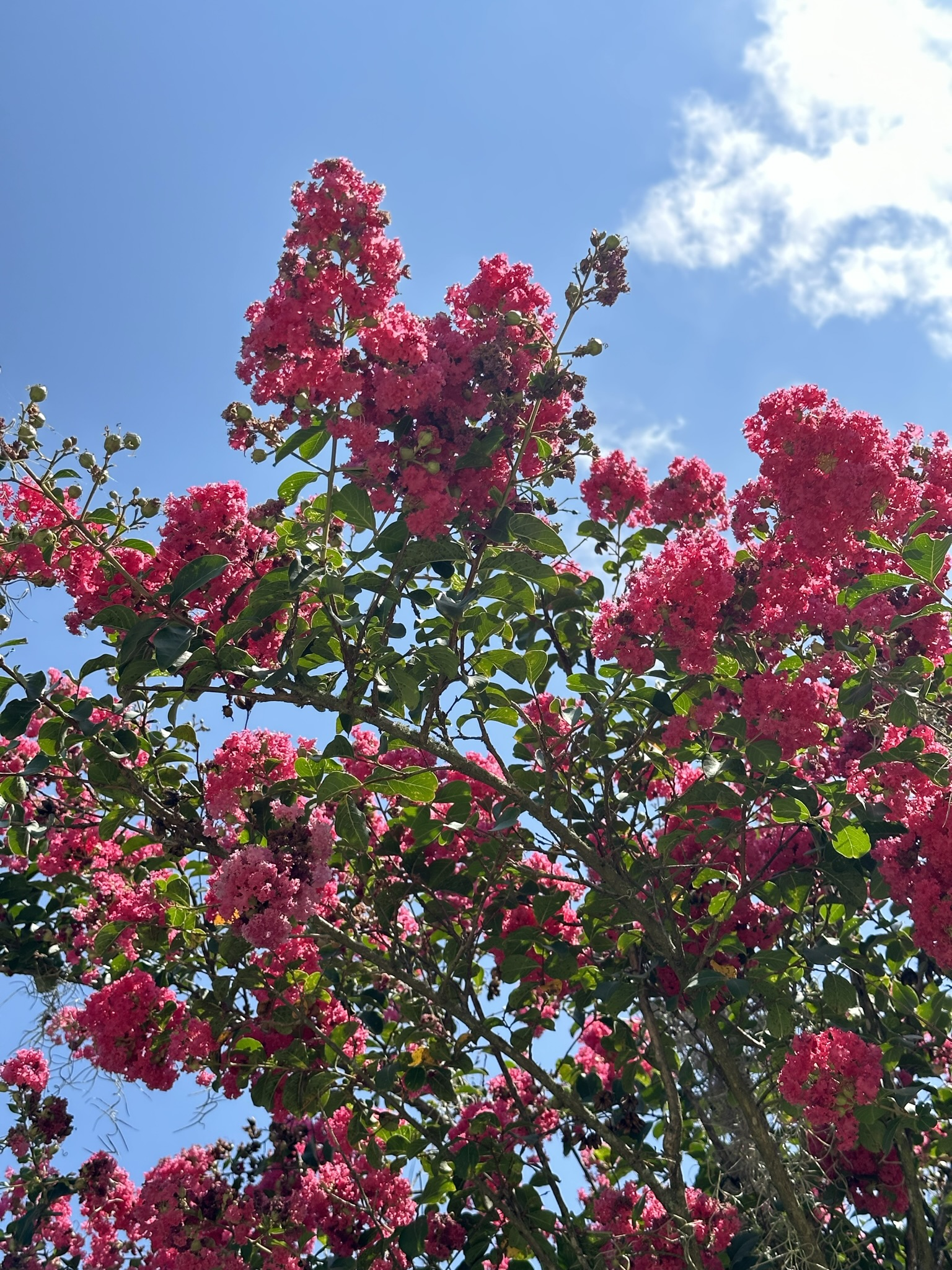
Louisiana pink crepe myrtle

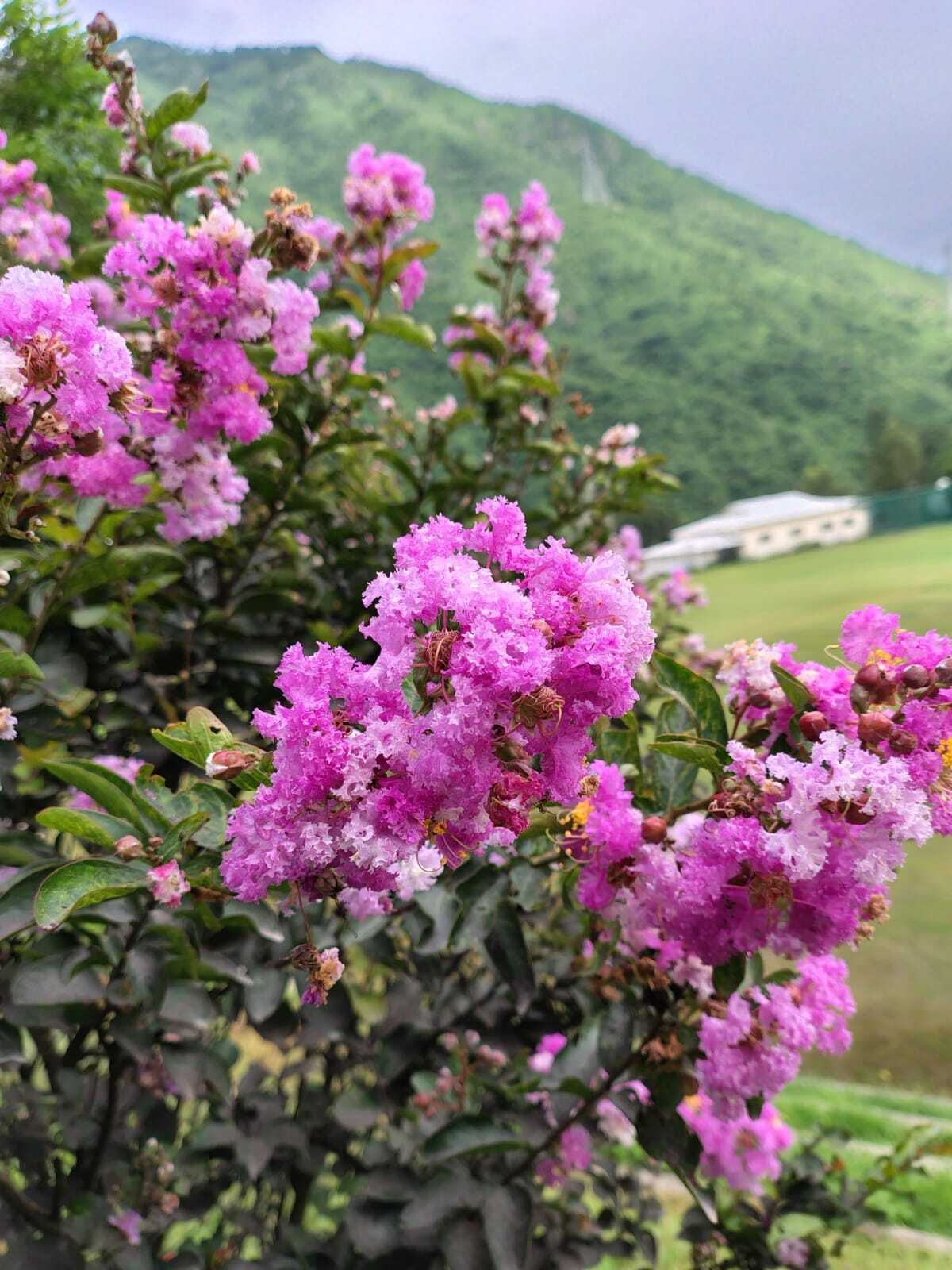
Crepe myrtle flowers in Himachal Pradesh, India
