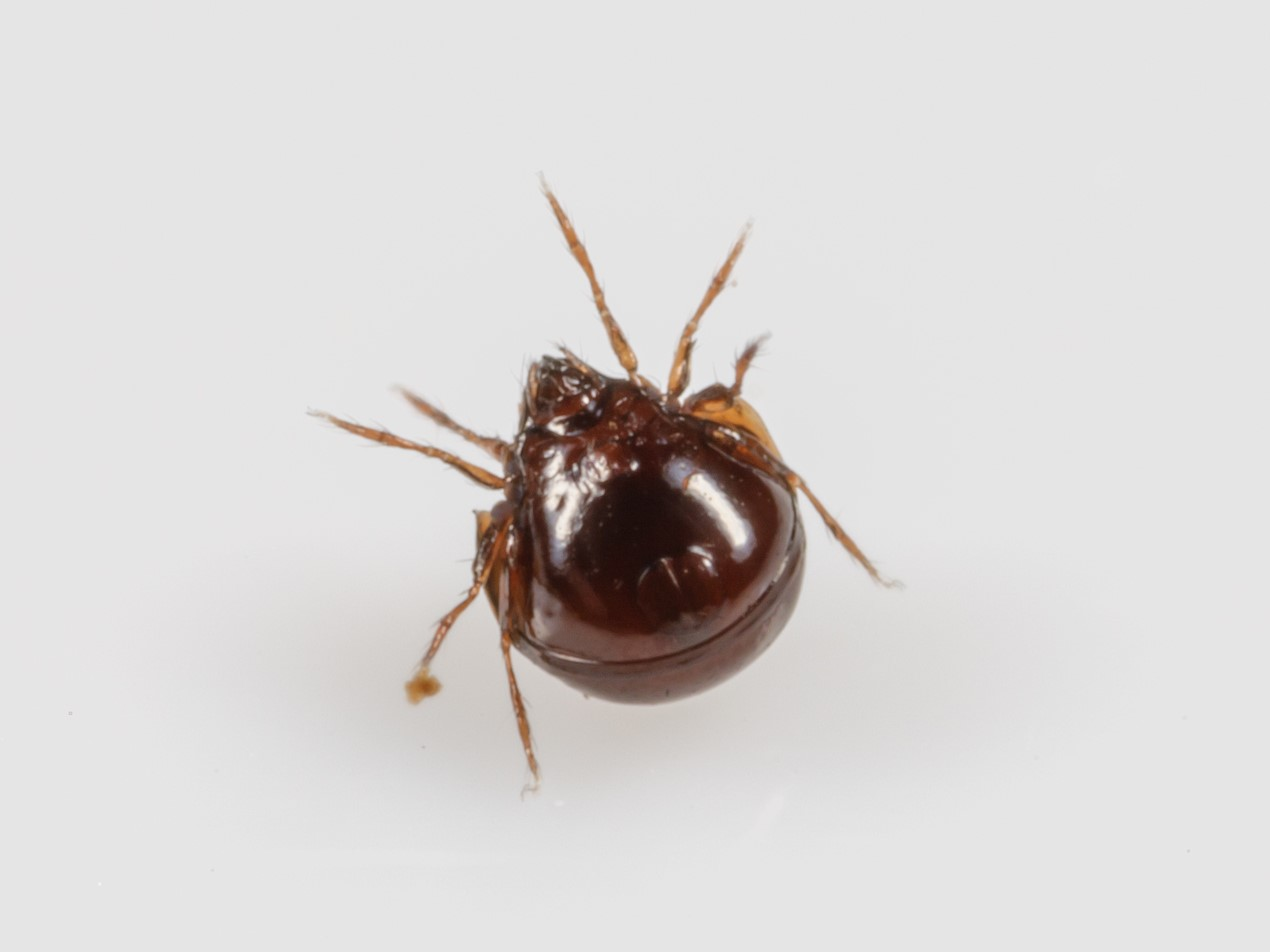
- Galumnidae sp.

Scientific classification
- Kingdom: Animalia
- Phylum: Arthropoda
- Subphylum: Chelicerata
- Class: Arachnida
- Order: Oribatida
- Superfamily: Galumnoidea
- Family: Galumnidae; Jacot, 1925

= Galumnidae =

Galumnidae Temporal range: Palaeogene–present

Family of mites

Galumnidae is a family of mites and ticks in the order Sarcoptiformes. There are at least 30 genera and 410 described species in Galumnidae.

== Genera ==
- Acrogalumna Grandjean, 1956
- Aegyptogalumna Al-Assiuty, Abdel-Hamid, Seif & El-Deeb, 1985
- Africogalumna Starý, 2005
- Allogalumna Grandjean, 1936
- Carinogalumna Engelbrecht, 1973
- Centroribates Berlese, 1914
- Cryptogalumna Grandjean, 1957
- Cuspidogalumna Starý, 2005
- Dicatozetes Grandjean, 1956
- Didymonycha Mahunka, 1984
- Dimidiogalumna Engelbrecht, 1972
- Disparagalumna Hammer, 1973
- Flagellozetes Balogh, 1970
- Galumna Heyden, 1826
- Globogalumna J. & P. Balogh, 1990
- Heterogalumna Balogh, 1960
- Kinezogalumna Aoki & Hu, 1993
- Kunstogalumna Starý, 2005
- Leptogalumna Balogh, 1960
- Neogalumna Hammer, 1973
- Notogalumna Sellnick, 1959
- Orthogalumna Balogh, 1961
- Pergalumna Grandjean, 1936
- Pilizetes Sellnick, 1937
- Pilogalumna Grandjean, 1956
- Psammogalumna Balogh, 1943
- Rostrogalumna Engelbrecht, 1973
- Sacculogalumna Engelbrecht, 1973
- Setogalumna P. Balogh, 1985
- Sphaerogalumna Balogh, 1961
- Stictozetes Berlese, 1916
- Taeniogalumna Balogh, 1962
- Trichogalumna Balogh, 1960
- Trichogalumnella Mahunka, 1992
- Vaghia Oudemans, 1919
- Xenogalumna Balogh, 1961
