= Pterolophia angulata =

Scientific classification
- Kingdom: Animalia
- Phylum: Arthropoda
- Clade: Pancrustacea
- Class: Insecta
- Order: Coleoptera
- Suborder: Polyphaga
- Infraorder: Cucujiformia
- Family: Cerambycidae
- Genus: Pterolophia
- Species: P. angulata

Binomial name
- Pterolophia angulata (Kolbe, 1893)

Synonyms
- Theticus angulatus Kolbe, 1893

Species of beetle

Pterolophia angulata is a species of beetle in the family Cerambycidae. It was described by Hermann Julius Kolbe in 1893. It has a wide distribution in Africa. It feeds on Lagerstroemia indica.

== Subspecies ==
- Pterolophia angulata angulata (Kolbe, 1893)
- Pterolophia angulata albocincta Gahan, 1894
- Pterolophia angulata marshalli Breuning, 1938
