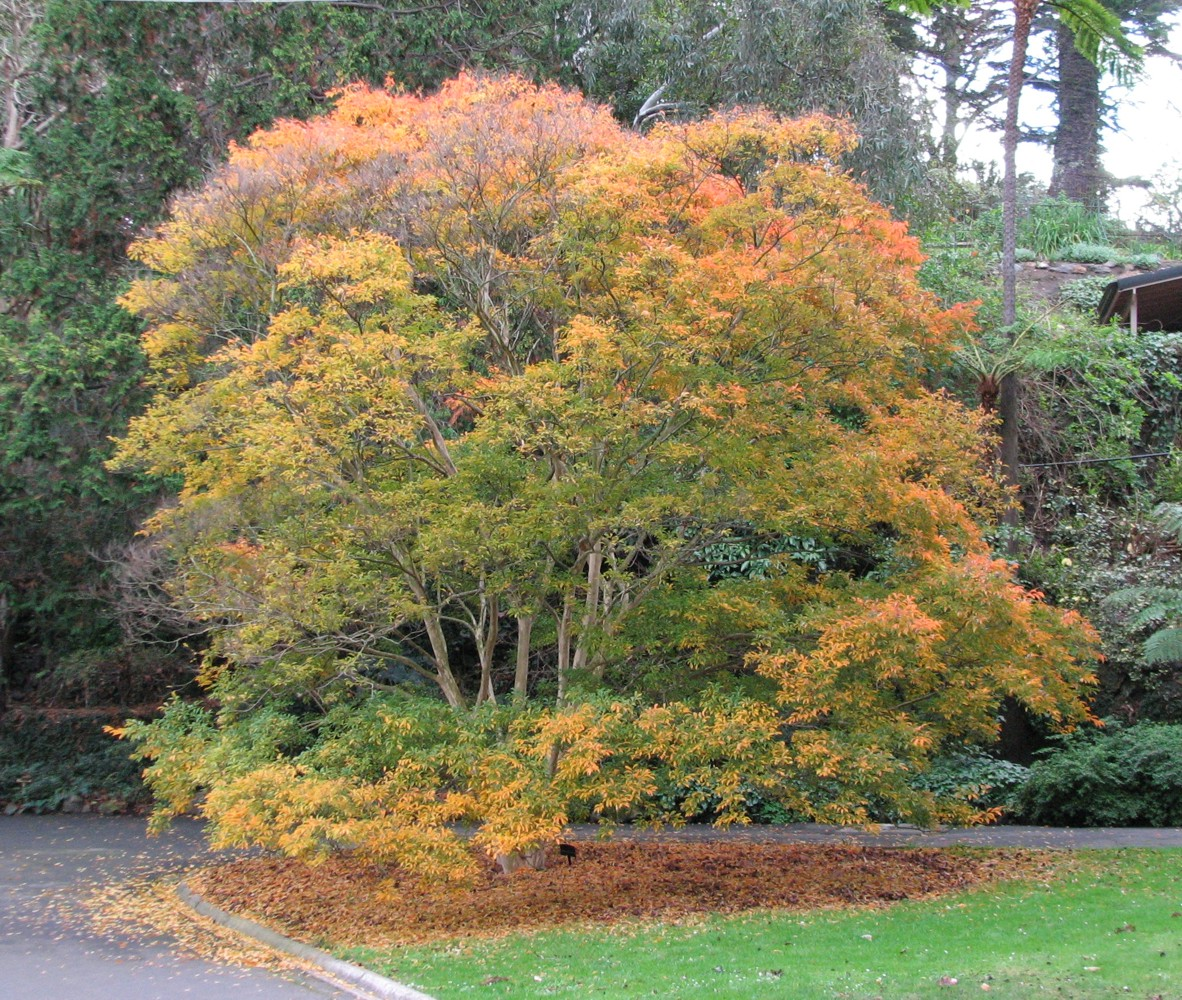

Conservation status
- Least Concern (IUCN 3.1)

Scientific classification
- Kingdom: Plantae
- Clade: Tracheophytes
- Clade: Angiosperms
- Clade: Eudicots
- Clade: Rosids
- Order: Myrtales
- Family: Lythraceae
- Genus: Lagerstroemia
- Species: L. subcostata

Binomial name
- Lagerstroemia subcostata Koehne

Synonyms
- Lagerstroemia fauriei Koehne; Lagerstroemia microcarpa Hance; Lagerstroemia subcostata var. hirtella Koehne; Lagerstroemia unguiculosa Koehne; Murtughas subcostata (Koehne) Kuntze

= Lagerstroemia subcostata =

Species of tree

Lagerstroemia subcostata, the Taiwan crepe myrtle, is a deciduous tree native to Japan, the Ryukyu Islands, Taiwan, and southern China, and introduced to the Philippines.

When L. subcostata var. fauriei is crossed with Lagerstroemia indica, the result is Lagerstroemia × egolfii (usually given as Lagerstroemia indica × fauriei), the hybrid crape myrtle, which has many cultivars and is widely planted as an ornamental in the United States.

== Subtaxa ==
The following varieties are accepted:

- Lagerstroemia subcostata var. fauriei (Koehne) Hatus. ex Yahara – Yakushima, Tanegashima, Ryukyus
- Lagerstroemia subcostata var. subcostata – entire range
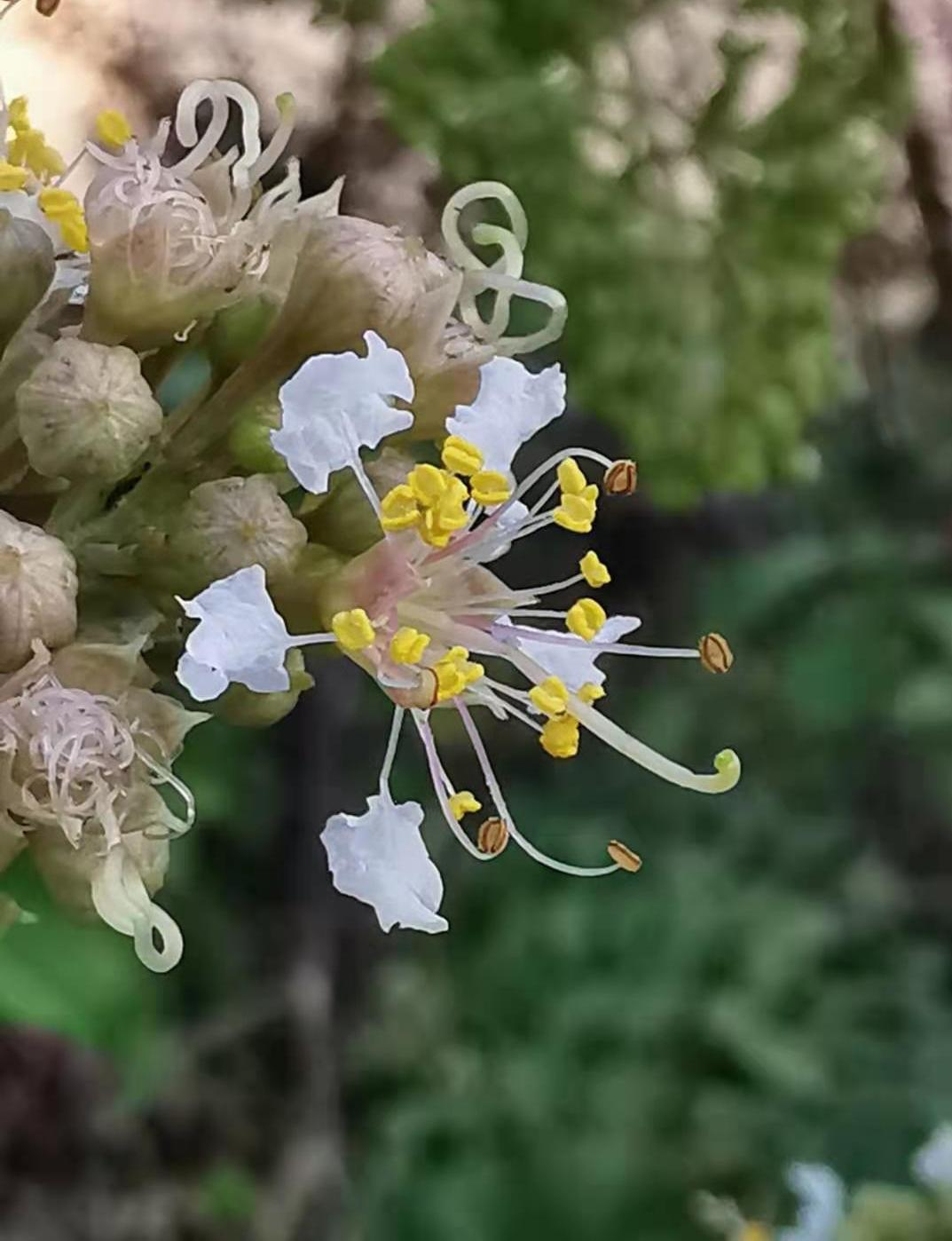
The flower has five or six creped petals. Five or six of the stamens are particularly long.

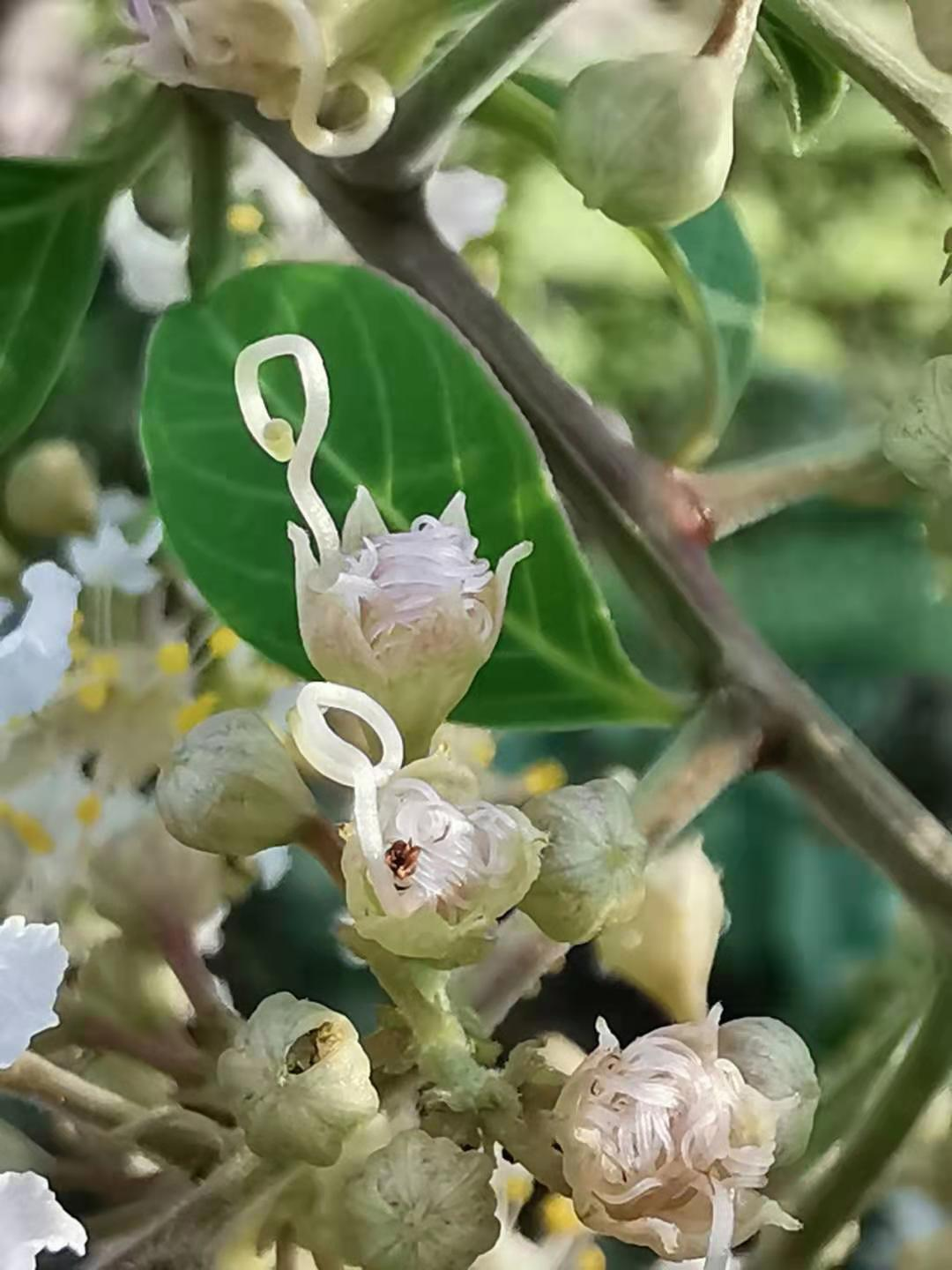
Flowers just opened

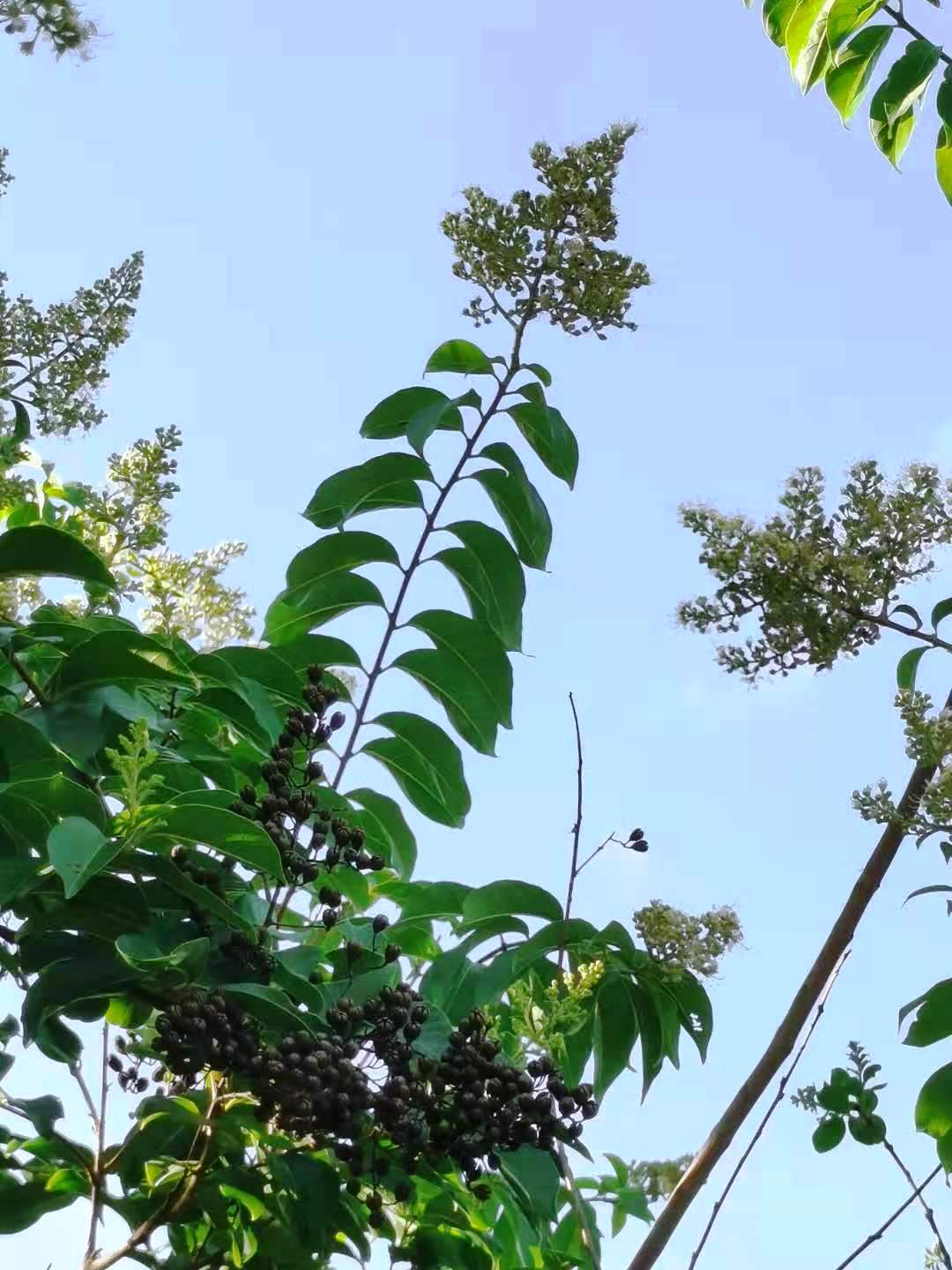
Panicle and phyllotaxis (opposite or alternate leaves)

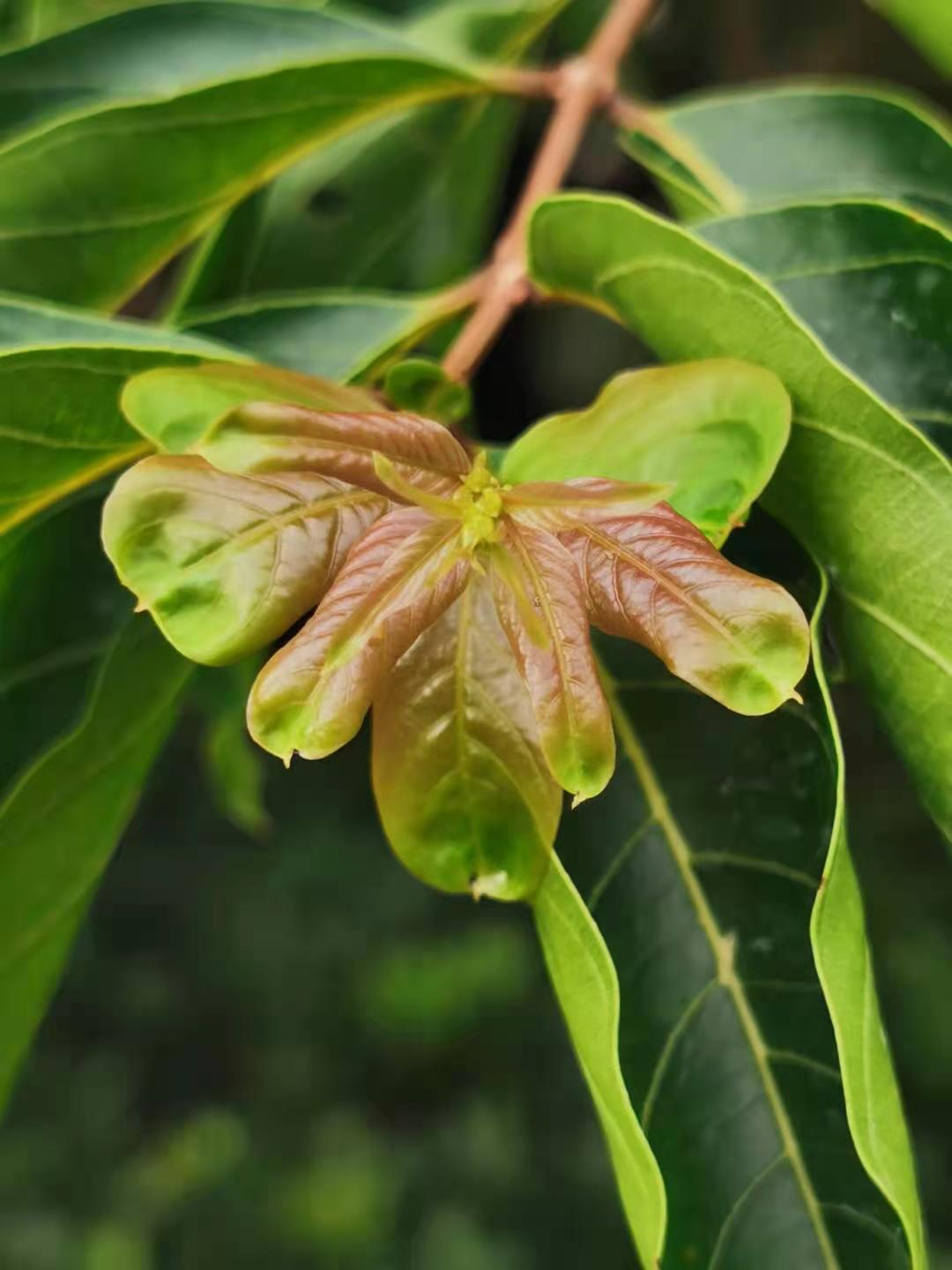
Color of young leaves

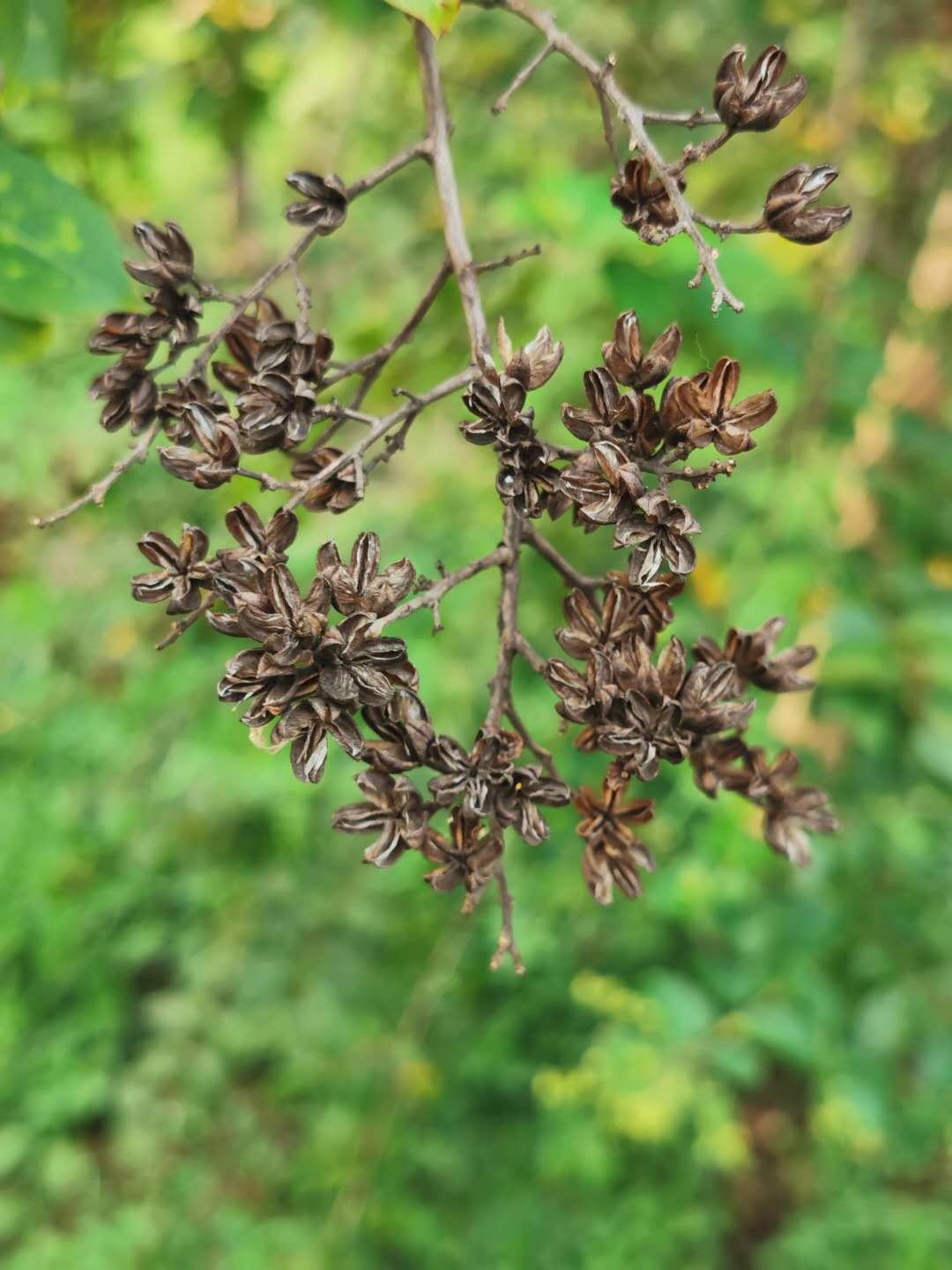
When the fruit is ripe it splits on its own

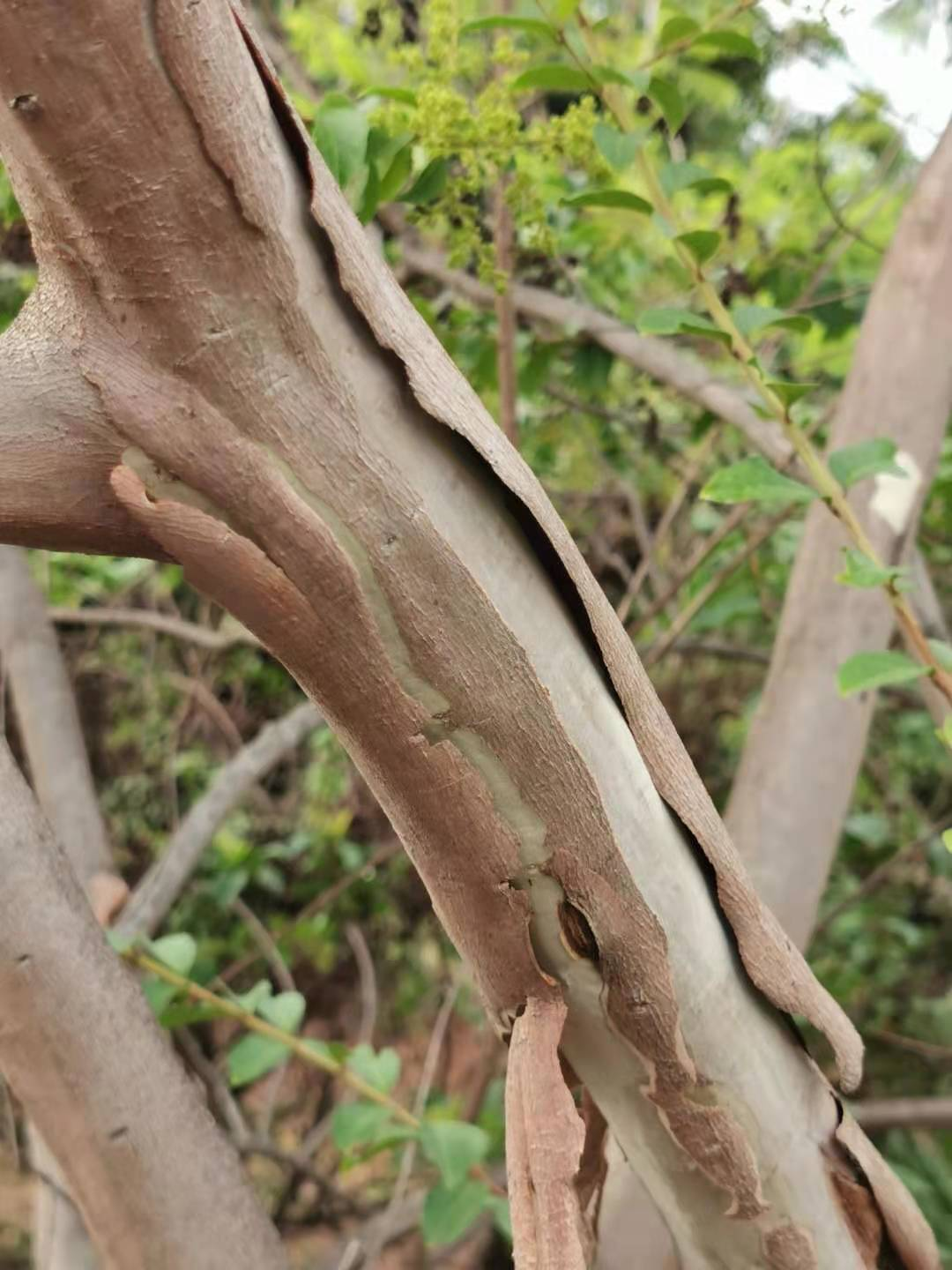
Old bark is falling off. Smooth bark is a major feature of Lagerstroemia subcostata.

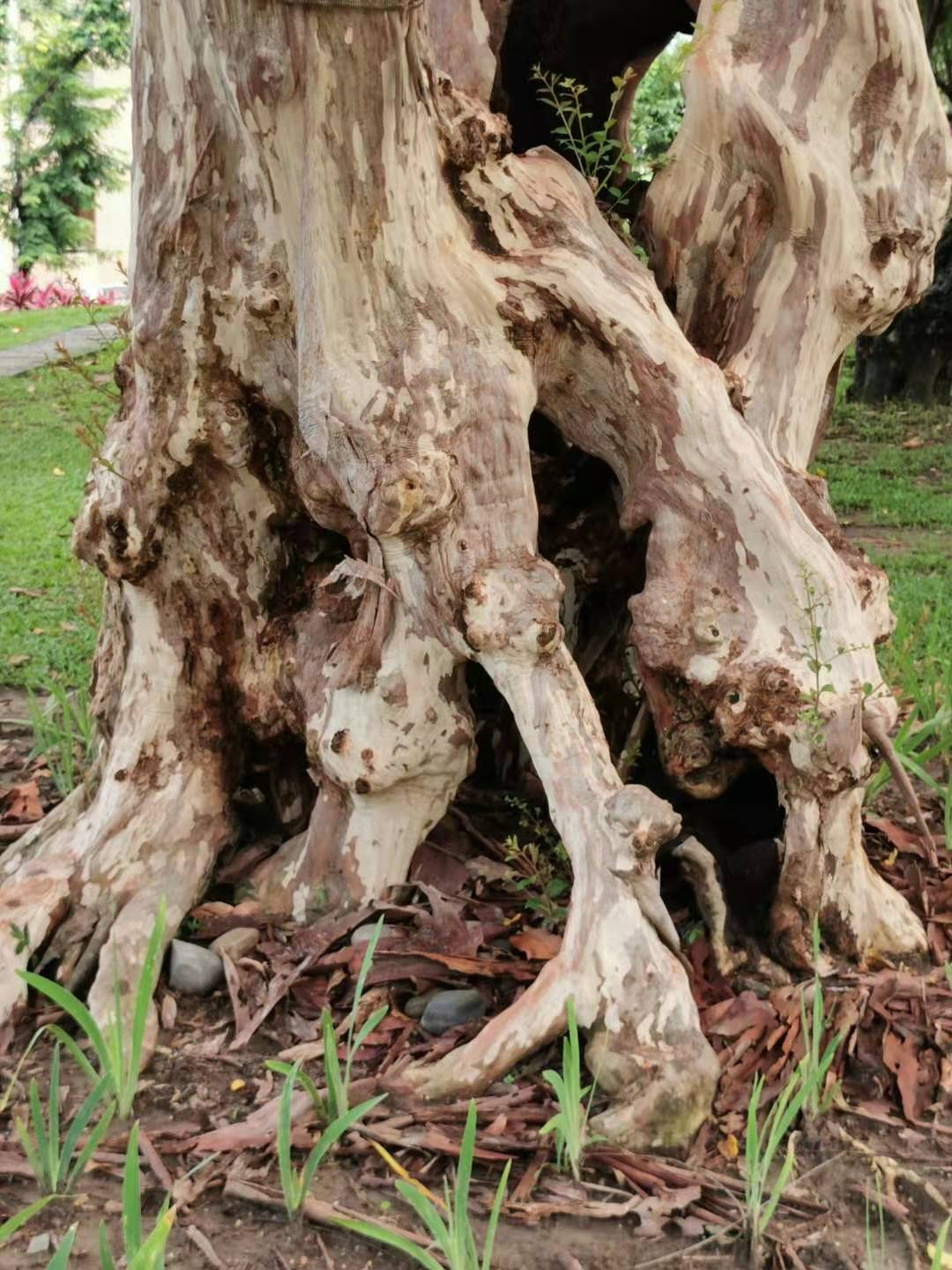
Tree trunks tend to be hollow

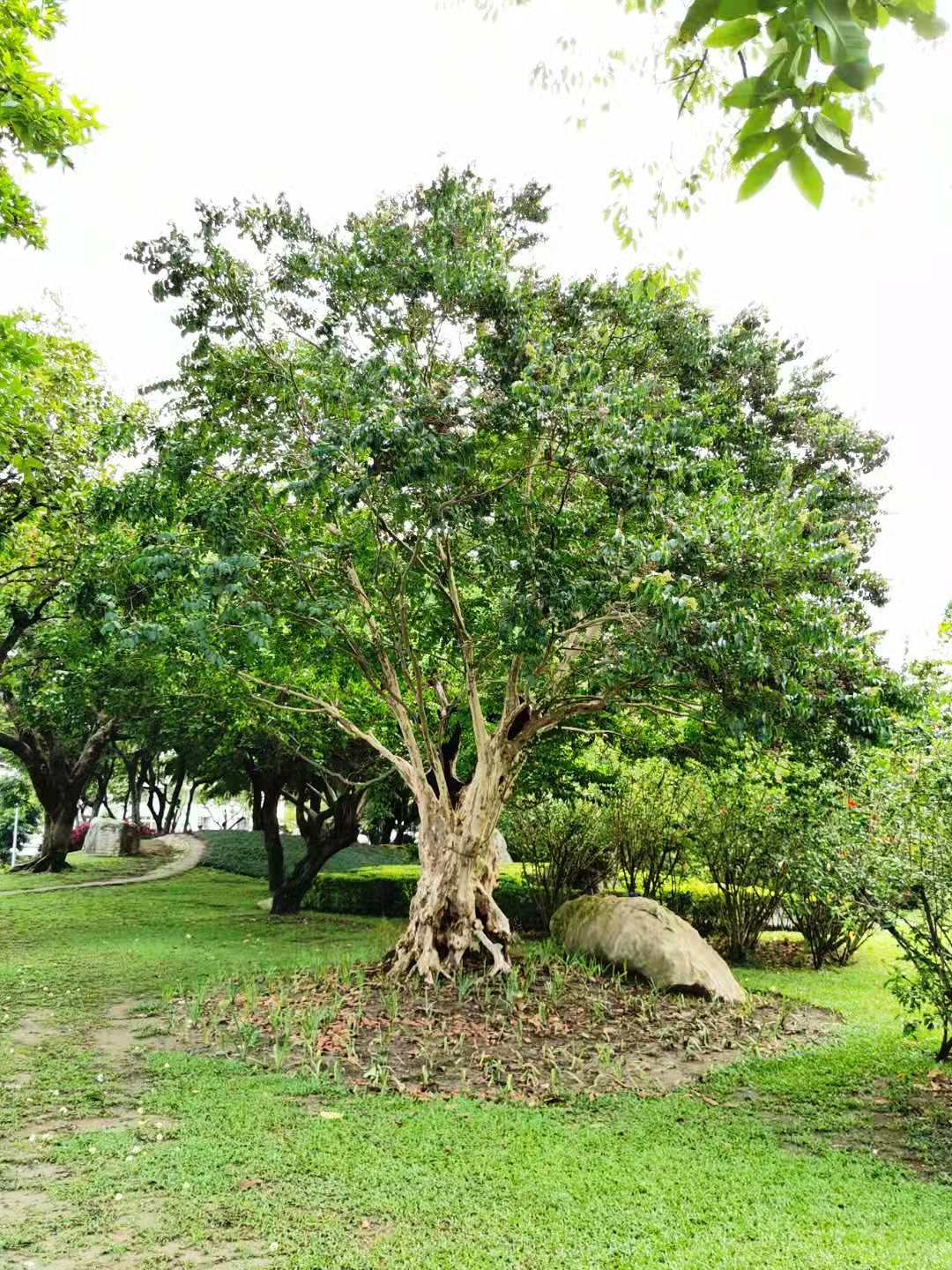
Uses: soil and water conservation, firewood, farm tools and traditional Chinese medicine
