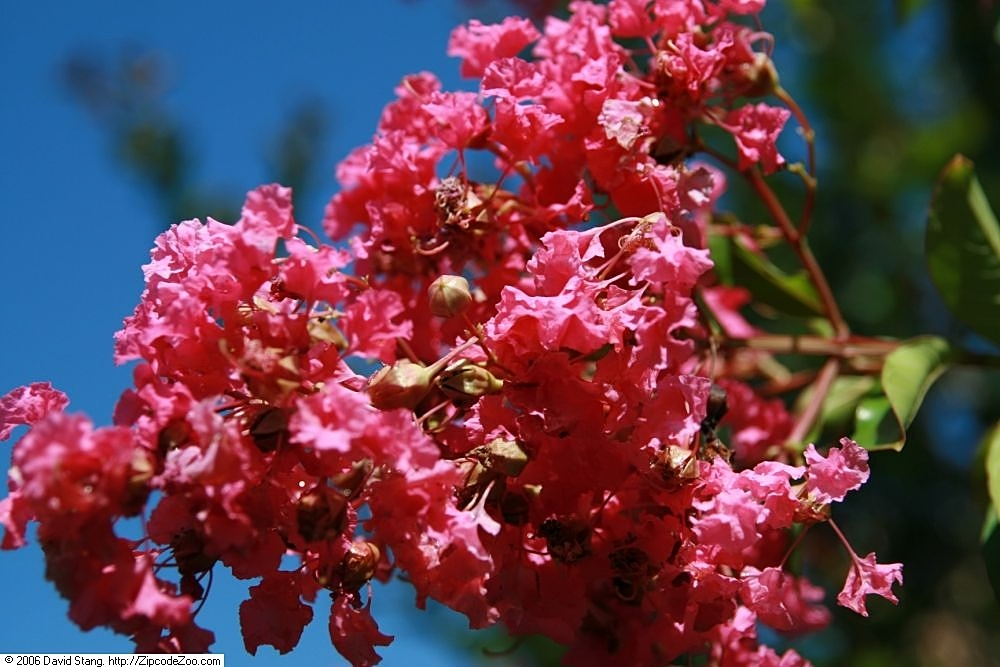
- 'Miami' cultivar flowers
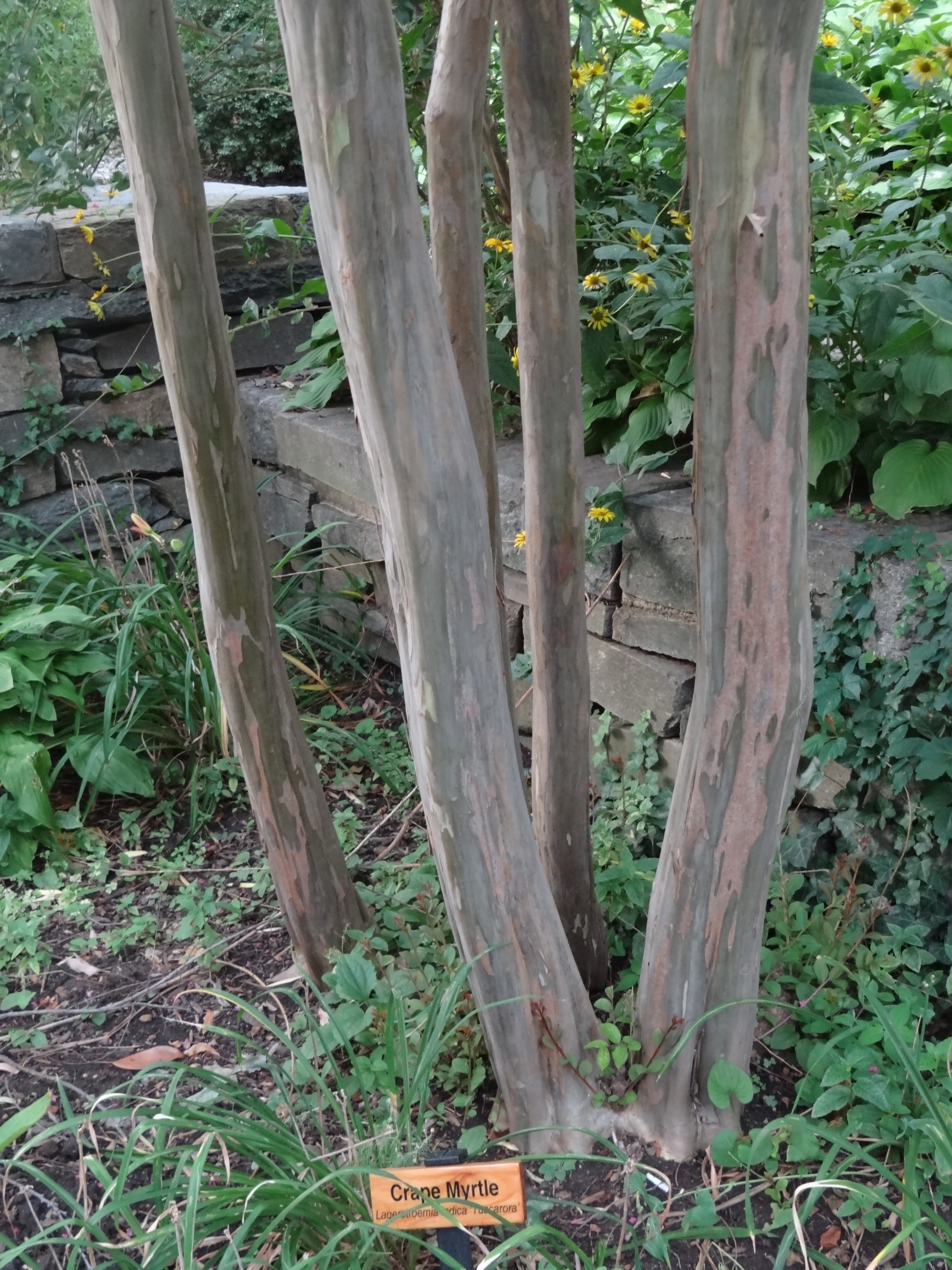
- 'Tuscarora' cultivar bark

Scientific classification
- Kingdom: Plantae
- Clade: Tracheophytes
- Clade: Angiosperms
- Clade: Eudicots
- Clade: Rosids
- Order: Myrtales
- Family: Lythraceae
- Genus: Lagerstroemia
- Species: L. × egolfii

Binomial name
- Lagerstroemia × egolfii Whittem. & Schori

= Lagerstroemia × egolfii =

Nothospecies of plant

Lagerstroemia × egolfii (also Lagerstroemia indica × fauriei), the hybrid crape myrtle, is an artificial hybrid species of flowering plant in the family Lythraceae. Its parents are Lagerstroemia indica (the crepe‑myrtle) and L. subcostata var. fauriei (the Japanese crape myrtle).

== Use and cultivation ==
Hybrid crape myrtles are widely planted in the United States as ornamental trees and shrubs. For example, the city of McKinney, Texas has a set of Crape Myrtle Trails and a World Collection Park devoted to over one hundred varieties of crape myrtles.

Their use in the United Kingdom was curtailed until recently because the plants rarely survived British winters even in mild southern coastal areas. It turns out that crepe myrtles need a sustained period of hot weather in the summer to "ripen" the wood, or they will be damaged by frost in the winter. With increasing temperatures due to climate change and in urban heat islands, crepe myrtles are now being successfully planted, typically against a south-facing wall where they can "get a good baking".

== U.S. National Arboretum hybrids ==
Hybrids were created and released by the U.S. National Arboretum beginning in the 1950s, and are valued for their cold hardiness, their resistance to powdery mildew, and their striking patterned bark. Hybrid cultivars are all named for Native American tribes. Earlier hybrids had lavender or white flowers, with brighter colors (and dwarf cultivars) being developed later through additional crossing and selection, or via backcrossing.

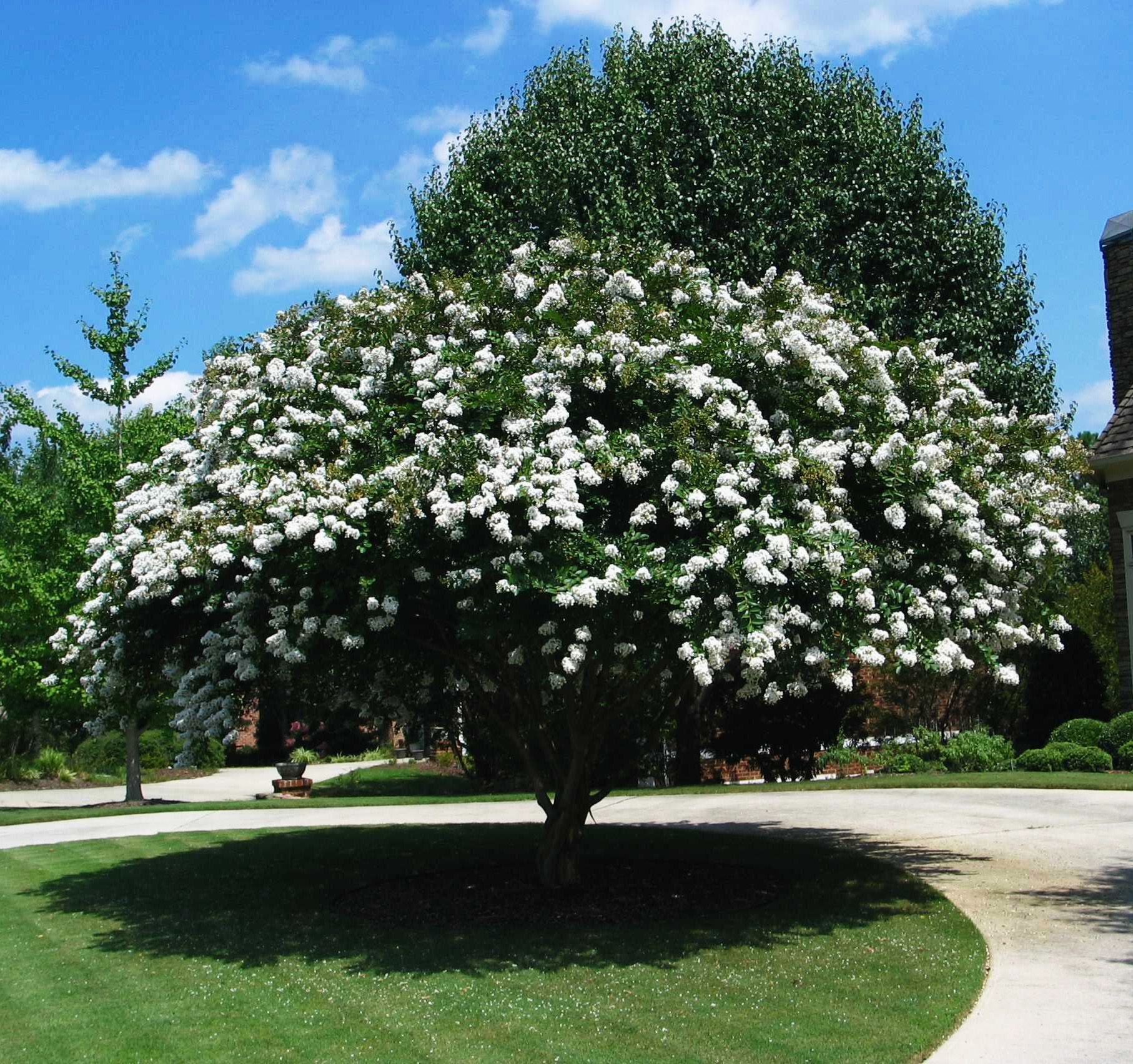
'Acoma' cultivar in bloom

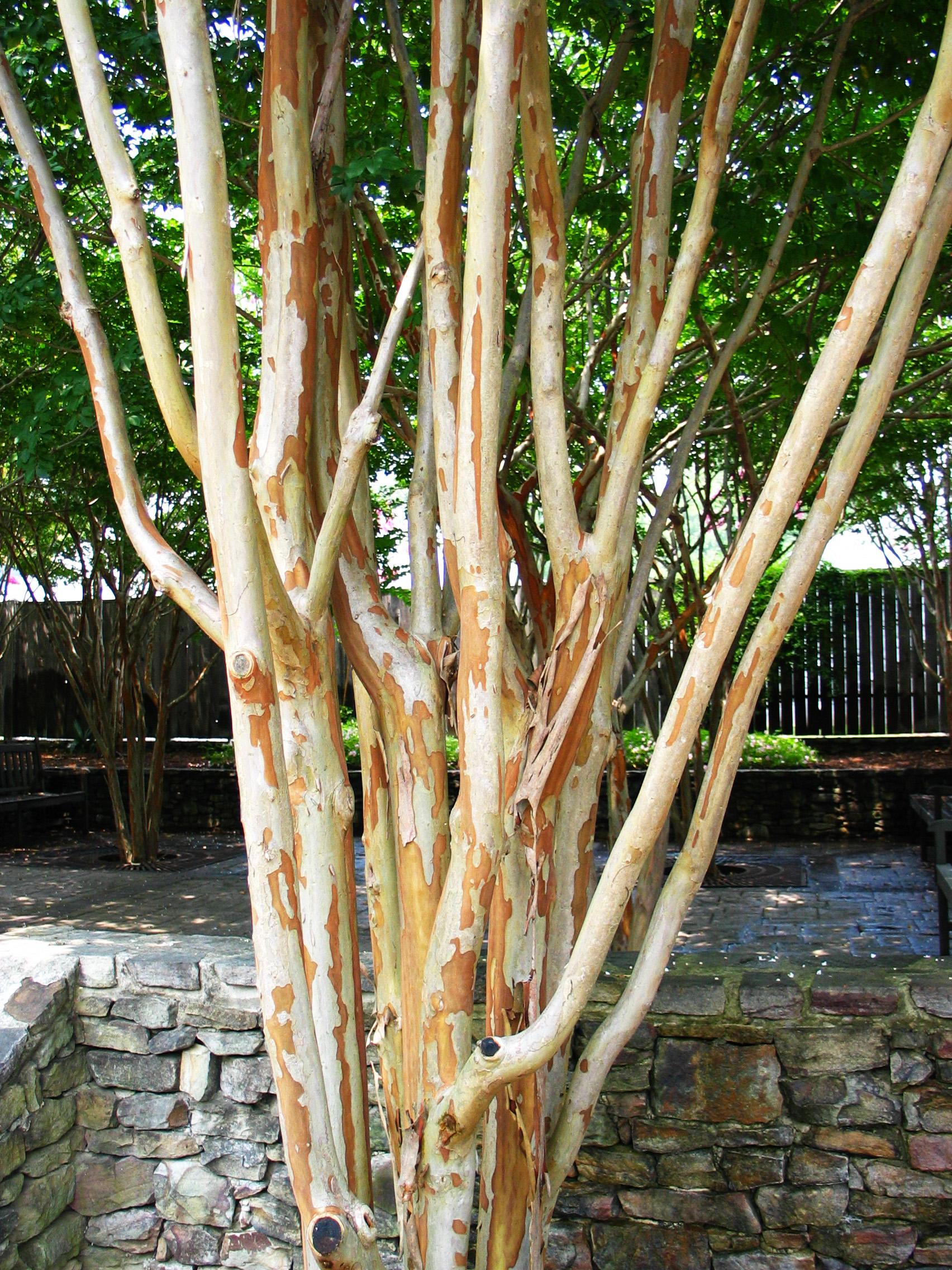
'Apalachee' cultivar bark

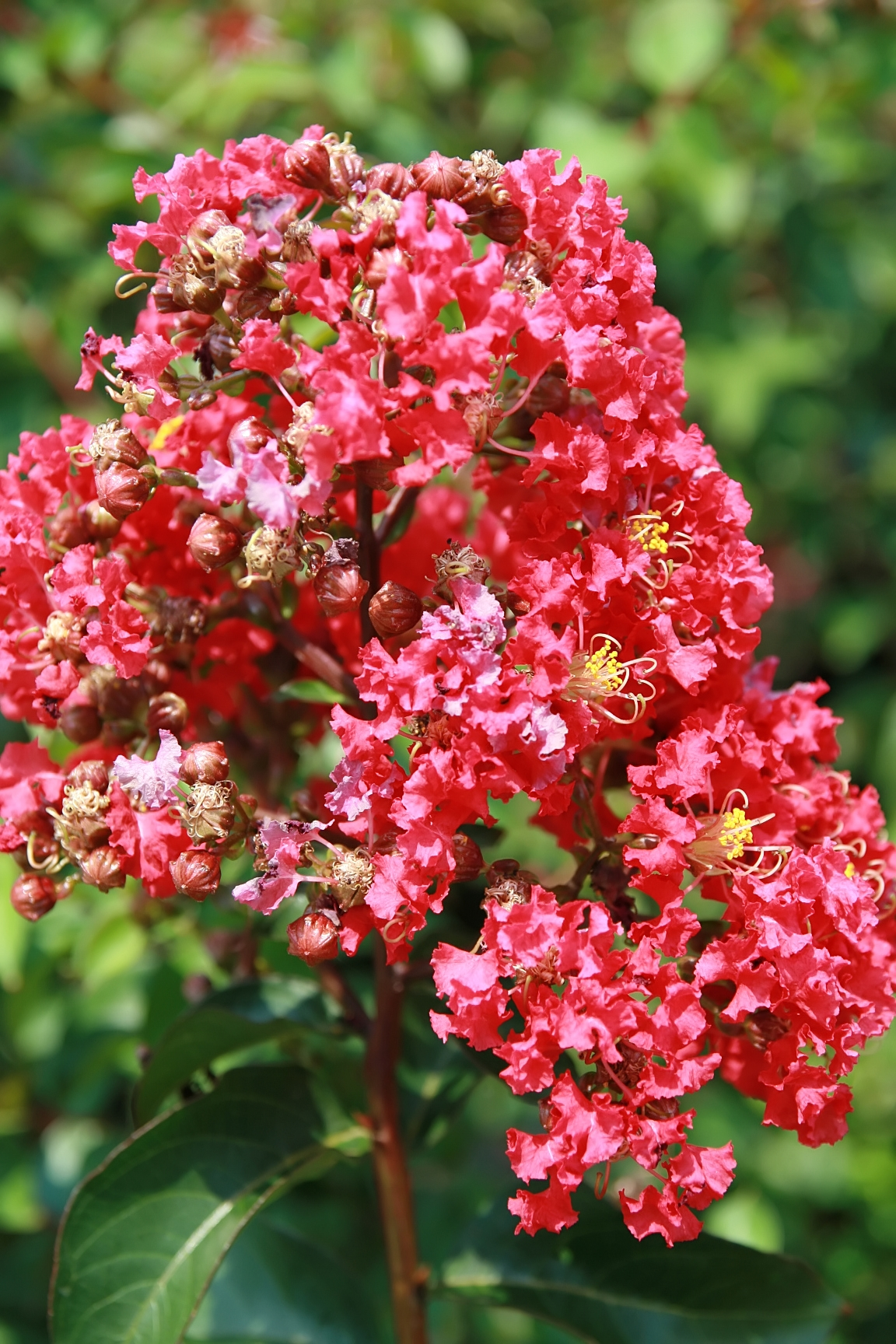
'Arapaho' cultivar flowers

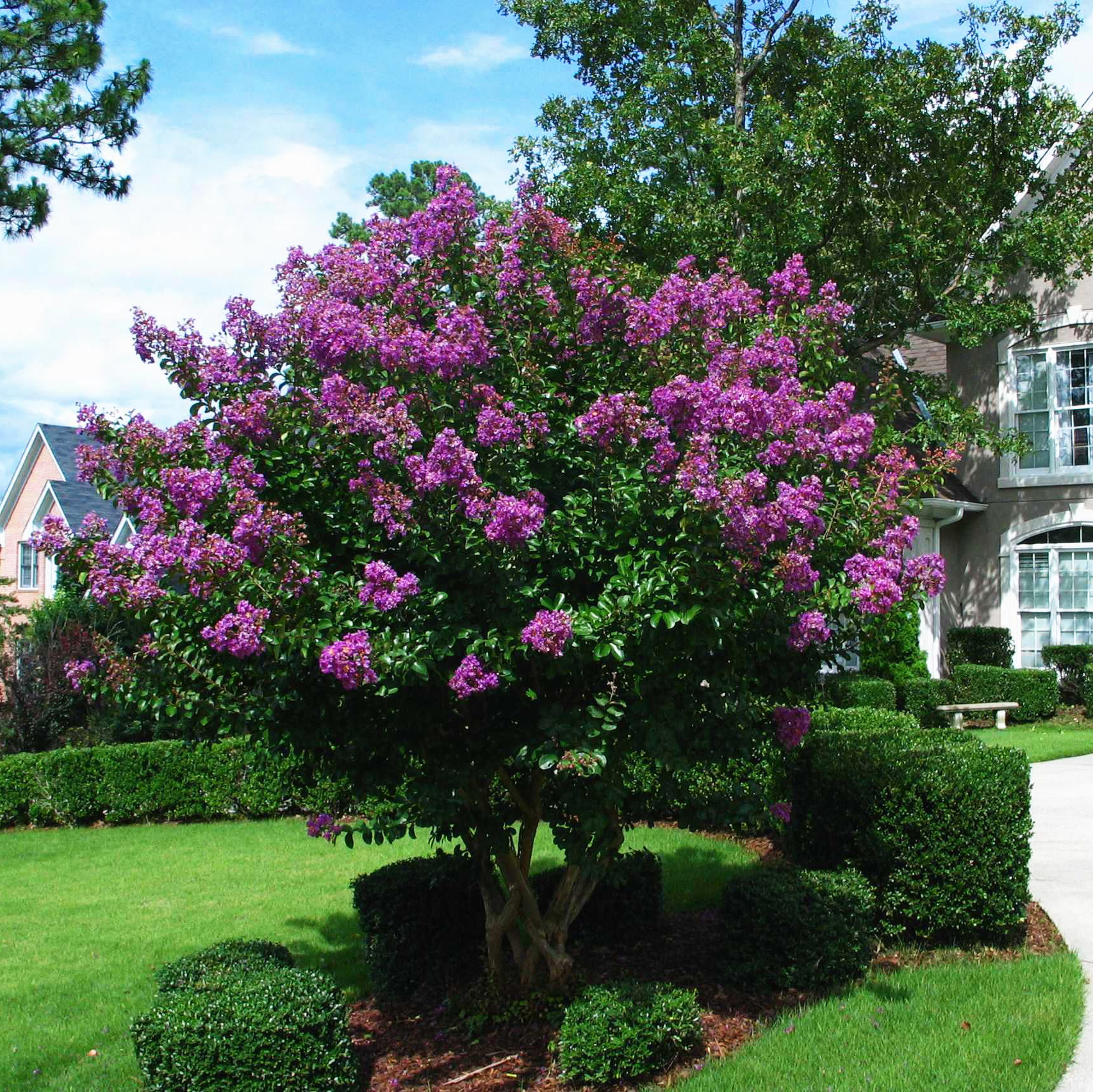
'Catawba' cultivar habit

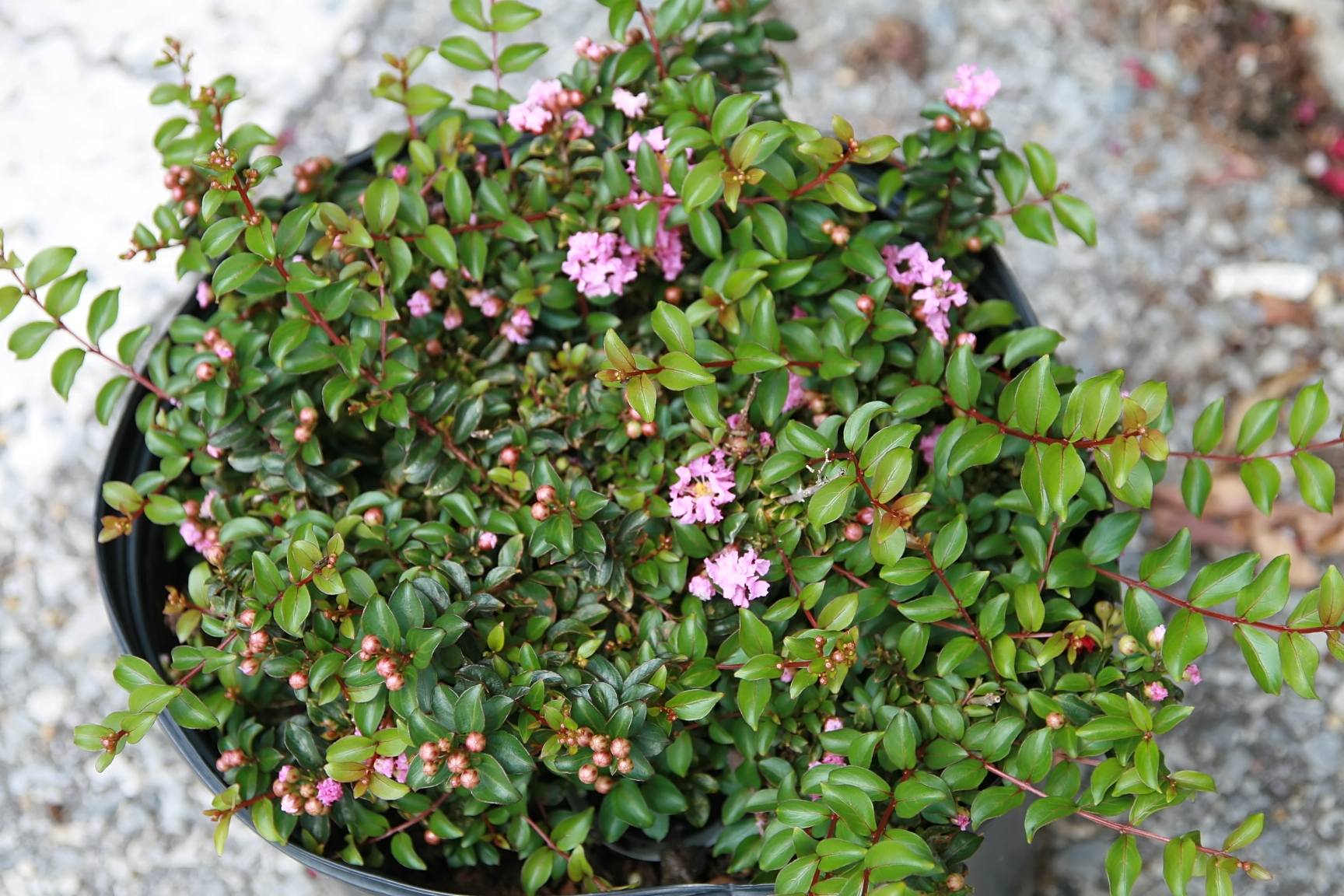
'Chickasaw' dwarf cultivar in a pot

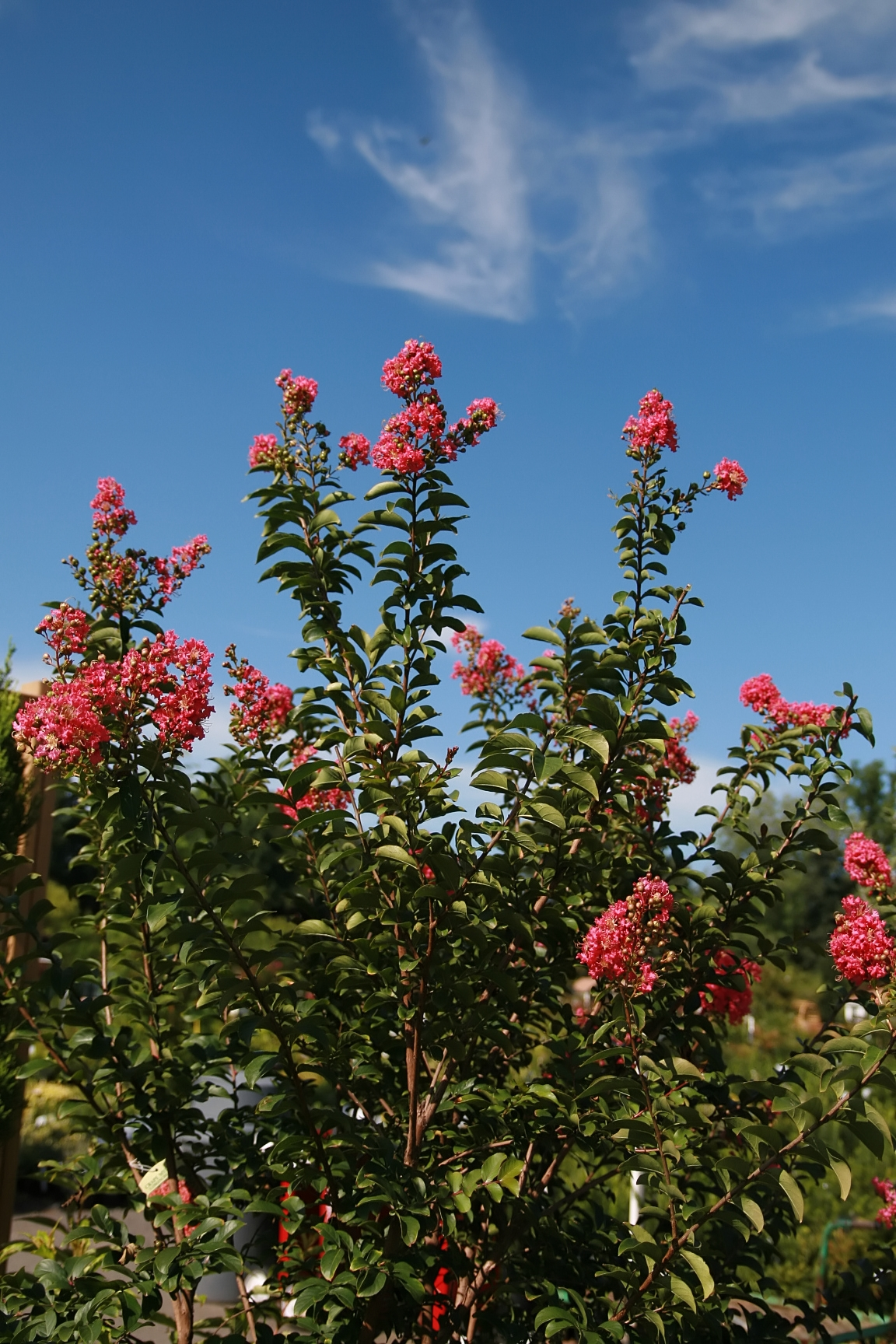
'Comanche' cultivar in bloom

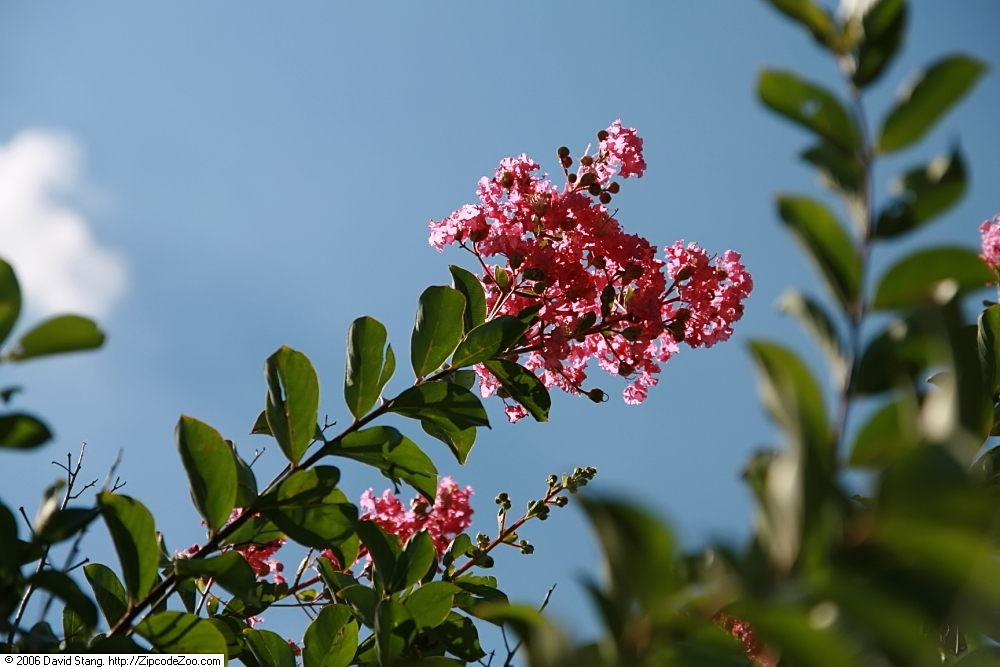
'Hopi' cultivar against the sky

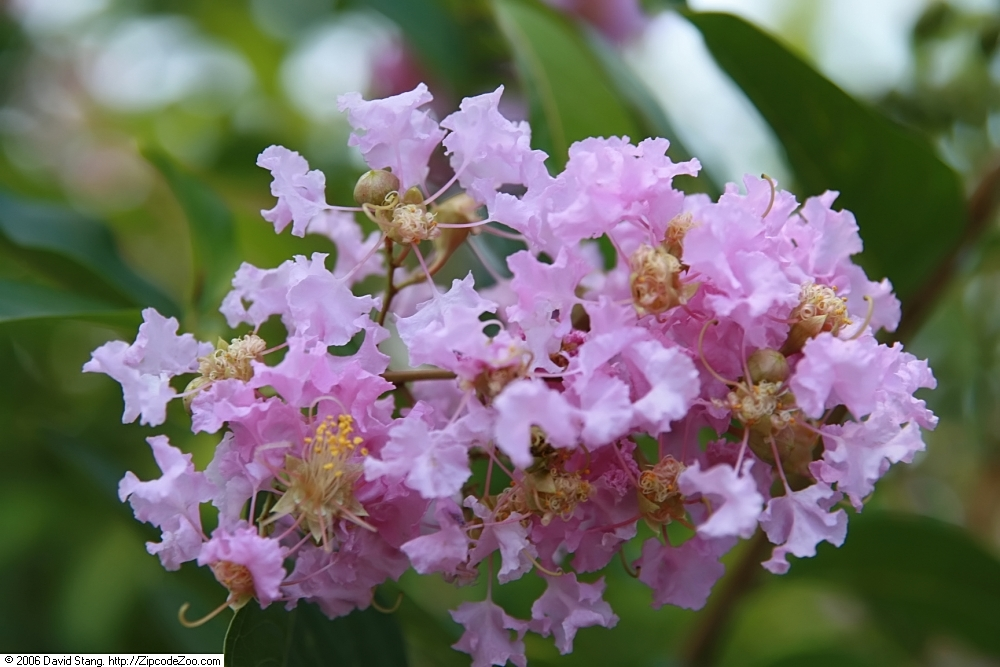
'Muskogee' cultivar flowers

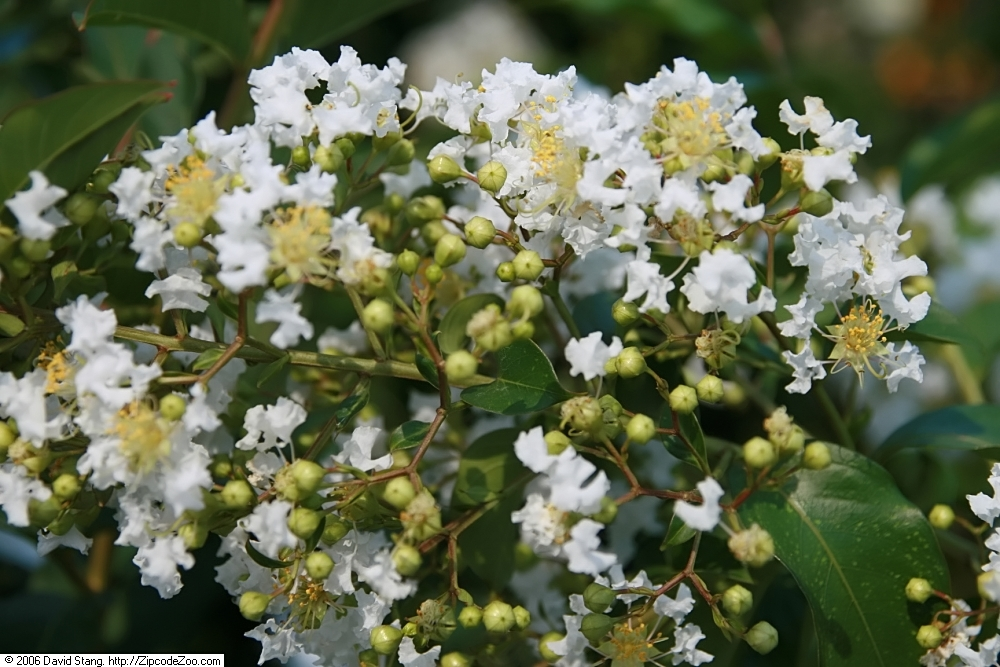
'Natchez' cultivar flowers

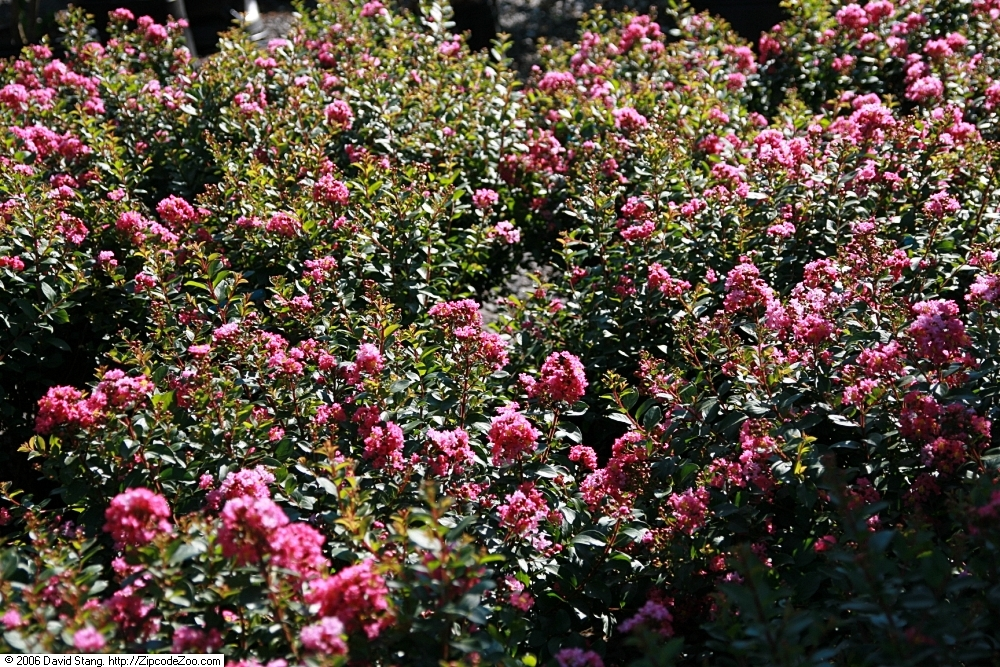
'Pocomoke' cultivar hedge

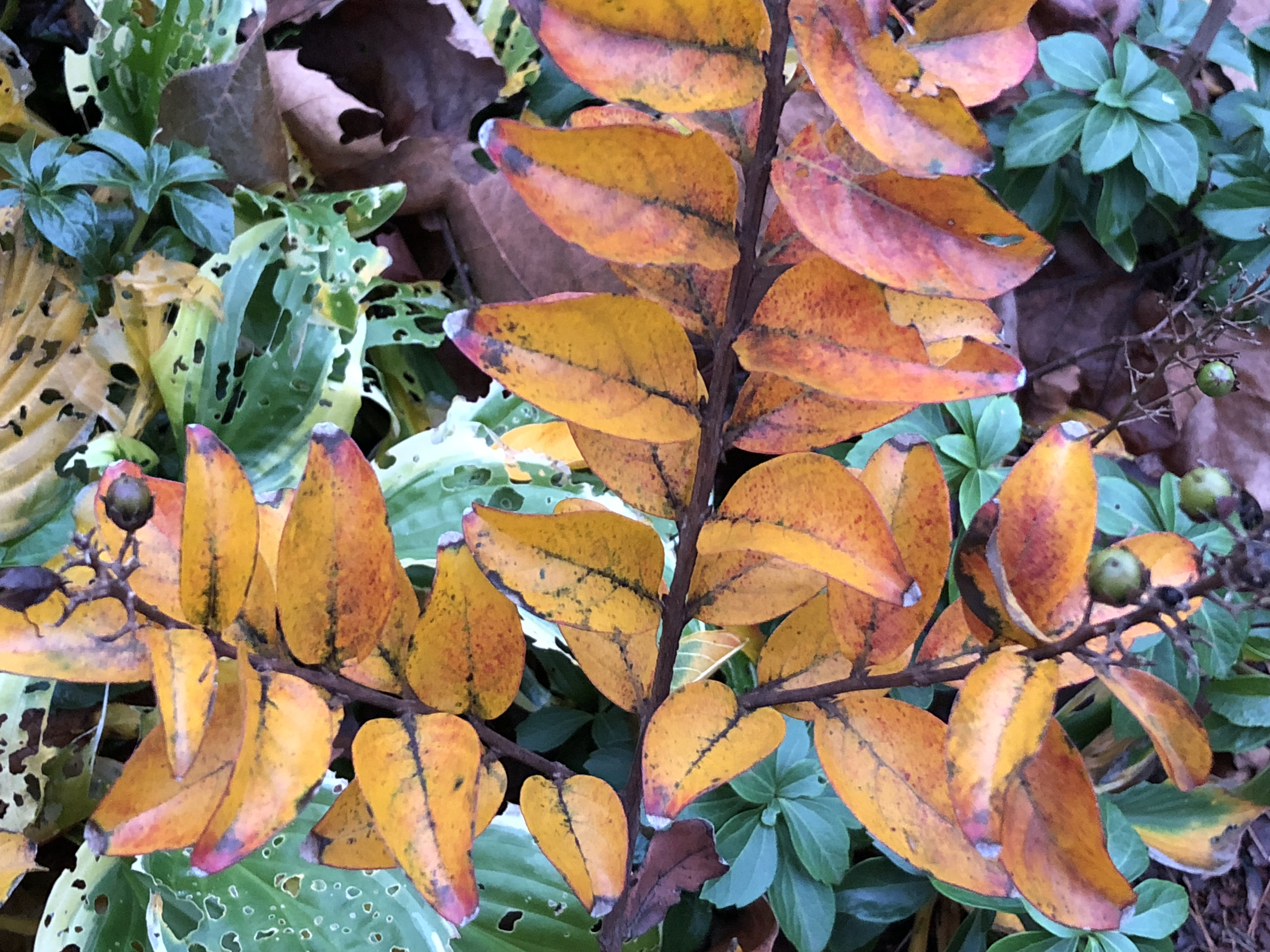
'Purple Magic' cultivar autumn colors

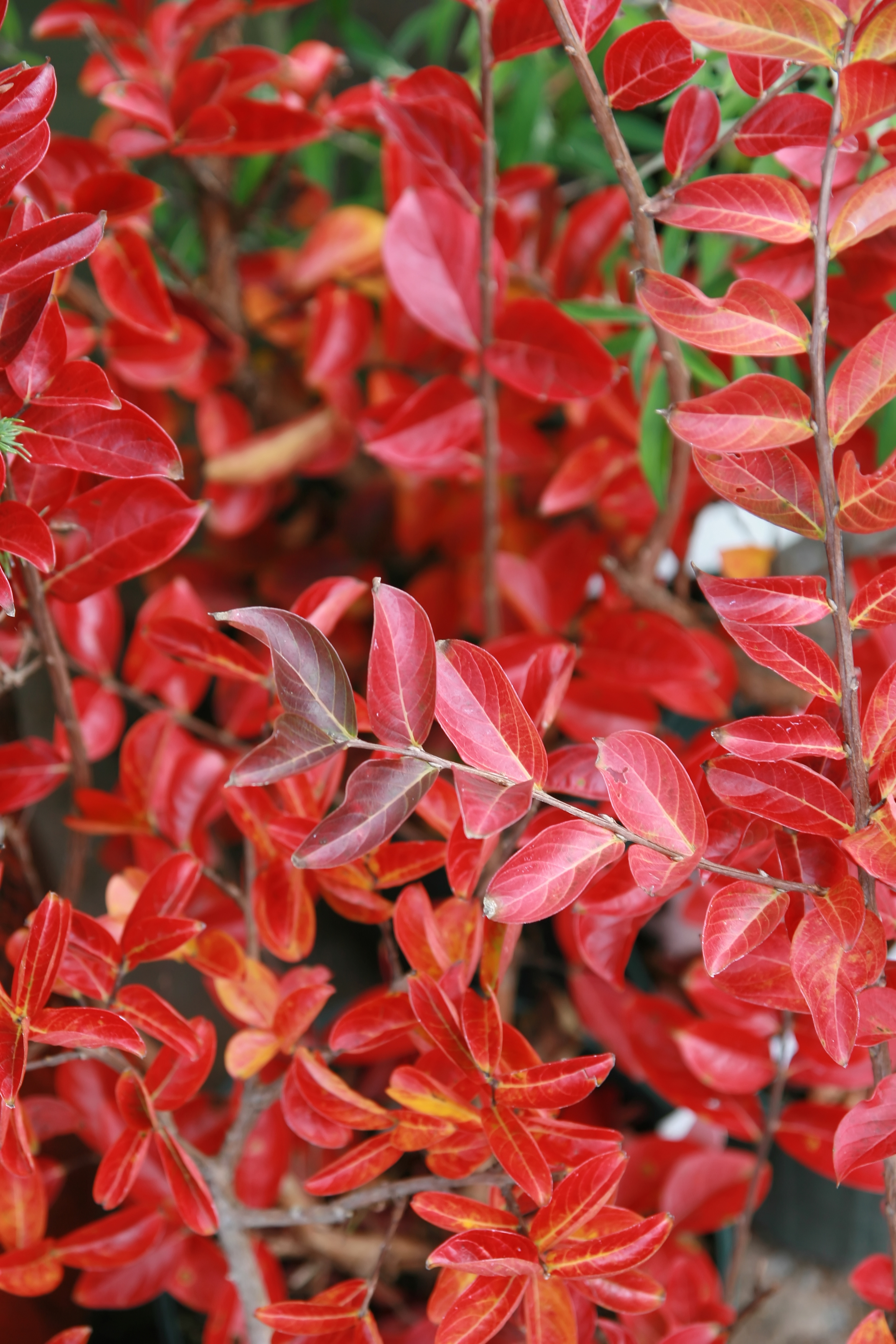
'Sioux' cultivar autumn colors

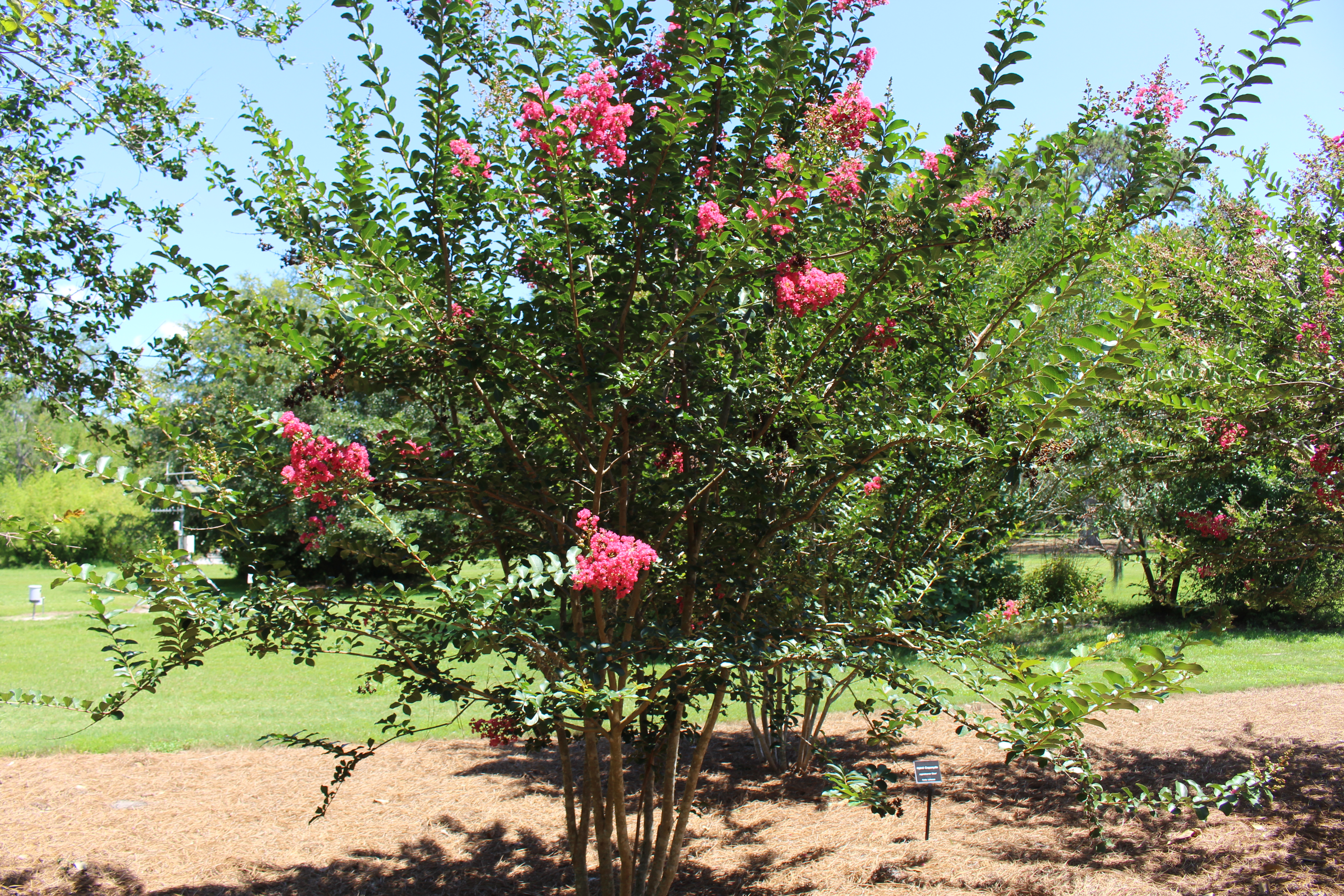
'Tuscarora' cultivar at the Coastal Georgia Botanical Gardens

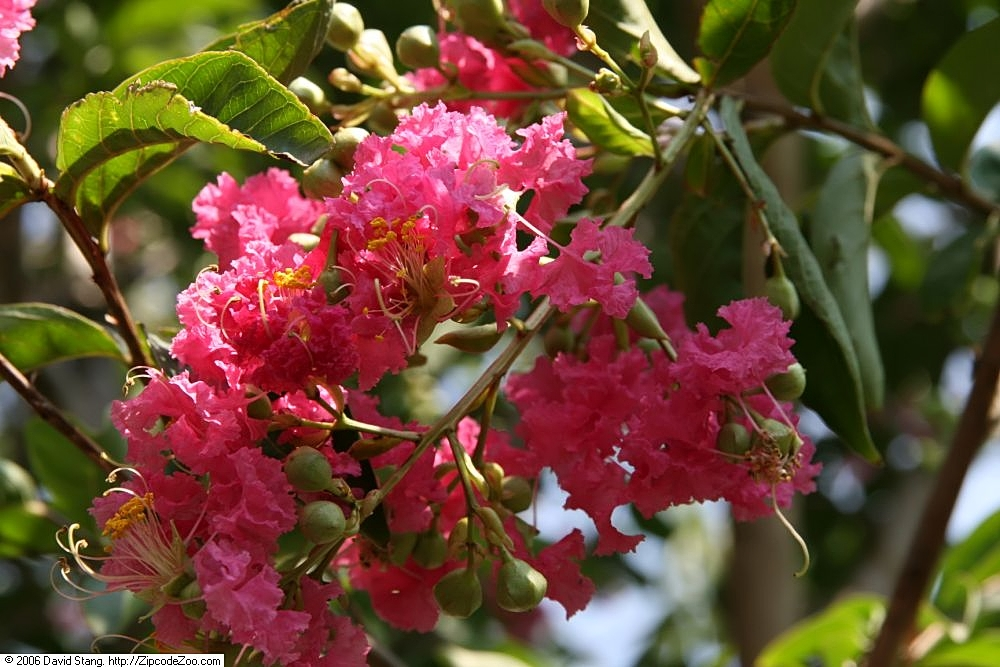
'Tuskegee' cultivar flowers

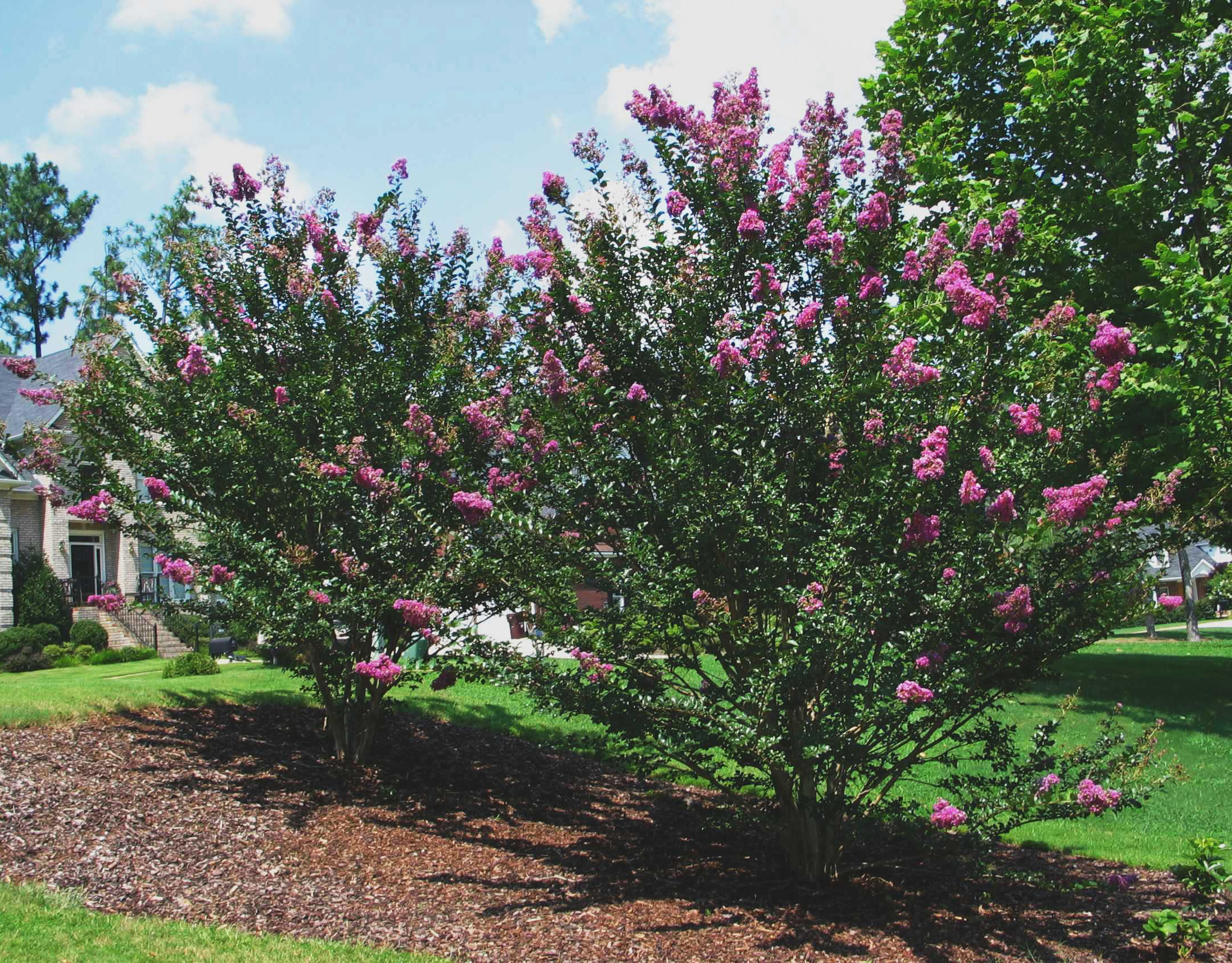
'Zuni' cultivar habit
