= Lagerstroemia indica 'Lingmeng' =

Cultivar of flowering plant

- Genus: Lagerstroemia
- Species: Lagerstroemia indica
- Hybrid parentage: Dallas Red × Velma's Royal Delight
- Cultivar: 'Lingmeng'
- Origin: Beijing, China

Lagerstroemia indica 'Lingmeng' (Chinese: 灵梦; lit. 'Spirit dream') is a cultivar of Lagerstroemia indica (known as the crape myrtle). It is characterized by its bicolored flowers that are red with white margins and have six radially symmetrical petals. Bred by students from Beijing Forestry University, 'Lingmeng' was formally recognized as a cultivar in 2017.

The principal breeder of 'Lingmeng' named it after Reimu Hakurei, (Note: Japanese: 博麗 霊夢, Hepburn: Hakurei Reimu) a character from the video game Touhou Project, for the resemblance of its flowers to Reimu's hair bow (in turn based on the outfits of miko). In 2018, the cultivar became widely known after gaining attention from Chinese-speaking ACG (Anime, Comics, Games) fans, trending on Zhihu and several other Chinese social media platforms.

== Description ==
External image
- Side-by-side comparison of 'Lingmeng' and Reimu, via IGN Japan

'Lingmeng' is a hybrid of the Lagerstroemia indica cultivars 'Dallas Red' and 'Velma's Royal Delight'. It has green leaves and grows as an upright, clumping shrub. Its bicolored flowers are primarily red with white margins, have six radially symmetrical petals, and are wrinkled around the edges. It produces flowers in abundance and has a long flowering period. Its typical uses are in gardening and landscaping.

== History ==
In 2012, Xu Wan (徐婉), a university student pursuing a master's degree at Beijing Forestry University, began researching the cultivar breeding of crape myrtle species. In 2014, the crape myrtle research group held a meeting to decide on names for the new varieties they planned to have recognized; there, Li Yaolin (李耀临), a fan of the video game Touhou Project, helped Xu photograph cultivars to prepare the application materials. Li noticed the similarity of the petals of Xu's cultivar to the hair bow worn by Reimu Hakurei, the protagonist of Touhou; he suggested that Xu name it after Reimu, which she ended up doing.

Although the choice of name was relatively nontraditional for a new cultivar, Xu liked it and had the first choice of selecting the cultivar's name due to being its principal breeder. Her professors did not particularly understand the name, but accepted it anyway. In September 2017, after passing an examination for distinction, uniformity, and stability, her plant was recognized as a new cultivar called 'Lingmeng' (灵梦), which is Reimu's name in Chinese. (Note: 灵梦 is the simplified Chinese equivalent of 霊夢, the kanji for Reimu's name. Southern Metropolis Daily and The Paper refer to 'Lingmeng' with 灵梦, while IGN Japan and Huffpost Japan use 霊夢.) It was subsequently featured in specialist botanical publications, but otherwise attracted little notice.

On April 19, 2018, after a picture of the cultivar's catalog was shared on Weibo by a Touhou topic poster, it came to the attention of ACG fans in China, who speculated on the similarity in its name and appearance to Reimu. It subsequently trended on Zhihu, China's largest Q&A website, and several other platforms, and became a topic of discussion in Japan as well. According to Jacob Parker-Dalton of Otaquest, a website dedicated to coverage of Japanese pop culture, 'Lingmeng' is an example of Touhou's cultural significance; he also saw the name as fitting for the close similarity in appearance with Reimu, a sentiment he noted was echoed by several Japanese news outlets. Au Yeung Yu Leung of IGN Japan suggested that the unexpectedly large-scale reaction showed the reach of the hundreds of millions of Chinese-speaking ACG fans, often known as otaku.

The newspaper Southern Metropolis Daily contacted the original breeder, who eventually confirmed the connection. Although Xu and Li enjoyed the interest in the cultivar, Li noted that it would likely not become commercially available in the near future due to the difficulty of partnering with companies, but hoped that people would explore the potential of new cultivar names. As of 2024, 'Lingmeng' was one of ninety officially authorized Lagerstroemia indica cultivars in China.

In 2019, the newspaper The Paper argued that while the concept of "hardcore" (硬核) fans in Chinese culture was originally used by the gaming community, the rise of 'Lingmeng' demonstrated its spread into more mainstream culture. The author noted that the initial discovery in the ACG community came from female fans, and contended that the flower's association with Reimu allowed a fictional character to obtain a real-life counterpart, bridging two traditionally disparate fields (ACG and academia) with the interest of "hardcore" fans.
